= Thomas Yale (New Haven Colony) =

Magistrate and cofounder of New Haven Colony

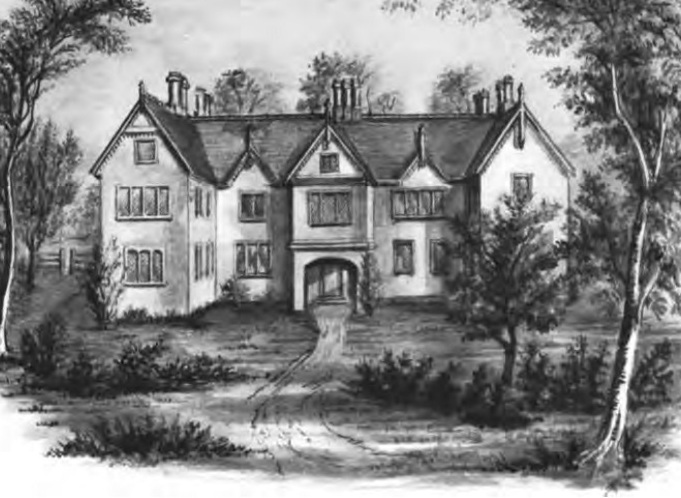
Tudor Manor of Capt Yale's family in New Haven Colony, c. 1640

Captain Thomas Yale (1616 – 1683) was an English military officer, merchant and magistrate. He was a puritan who emigrated from London to the New England Colonies aboard the Hector in 1637, and cofounded, with his stepfather, Governor Theophilus Eaton, the colony of New Haven. He was also a deputy to the Connecticut General Assembly and fought in King Philip's War.

His half-brother, Samuel Eaton, cofounded the Harvard Corporation, and his stepuncle, Nathaniel Eaton, became the first head of Harvard, and built Harvard Yard and Library. His nephew, Governor Elihu Yale, became an early benefactor and namesake of Yale College, while his former estate, situated in New Haven, became part of Yale's Old Campus.

== Early life ==
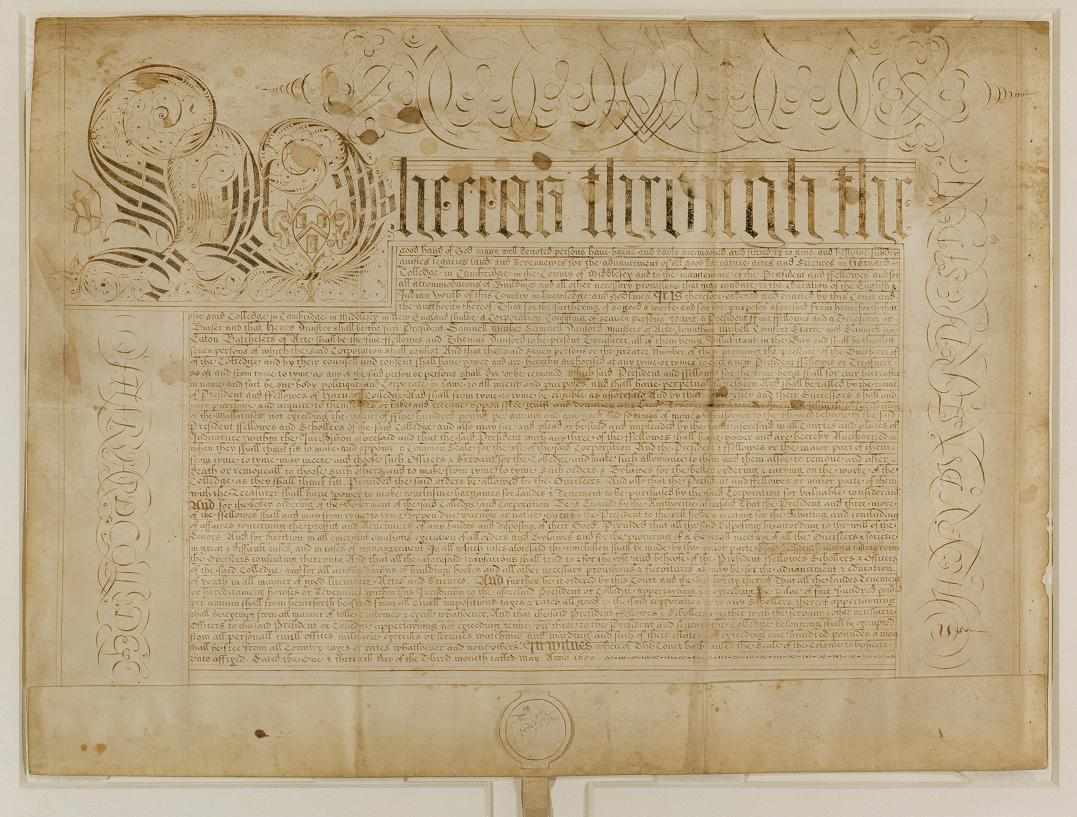
The 1650 charter of the Harvard Corporation, cofounded by Thomas Yale's half-brother, Samuel Eaton

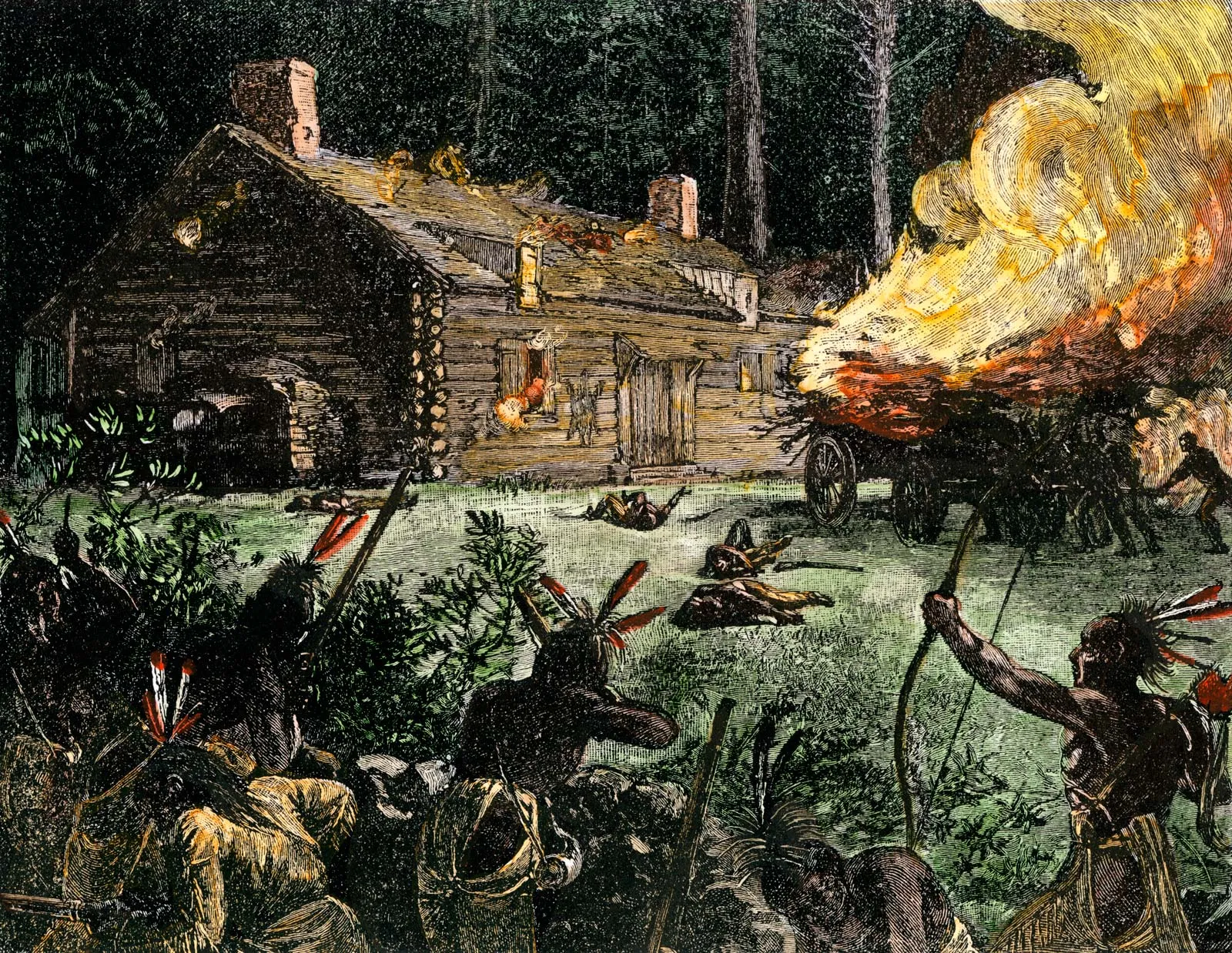
King Philip's War, Yale was a captain in its militia

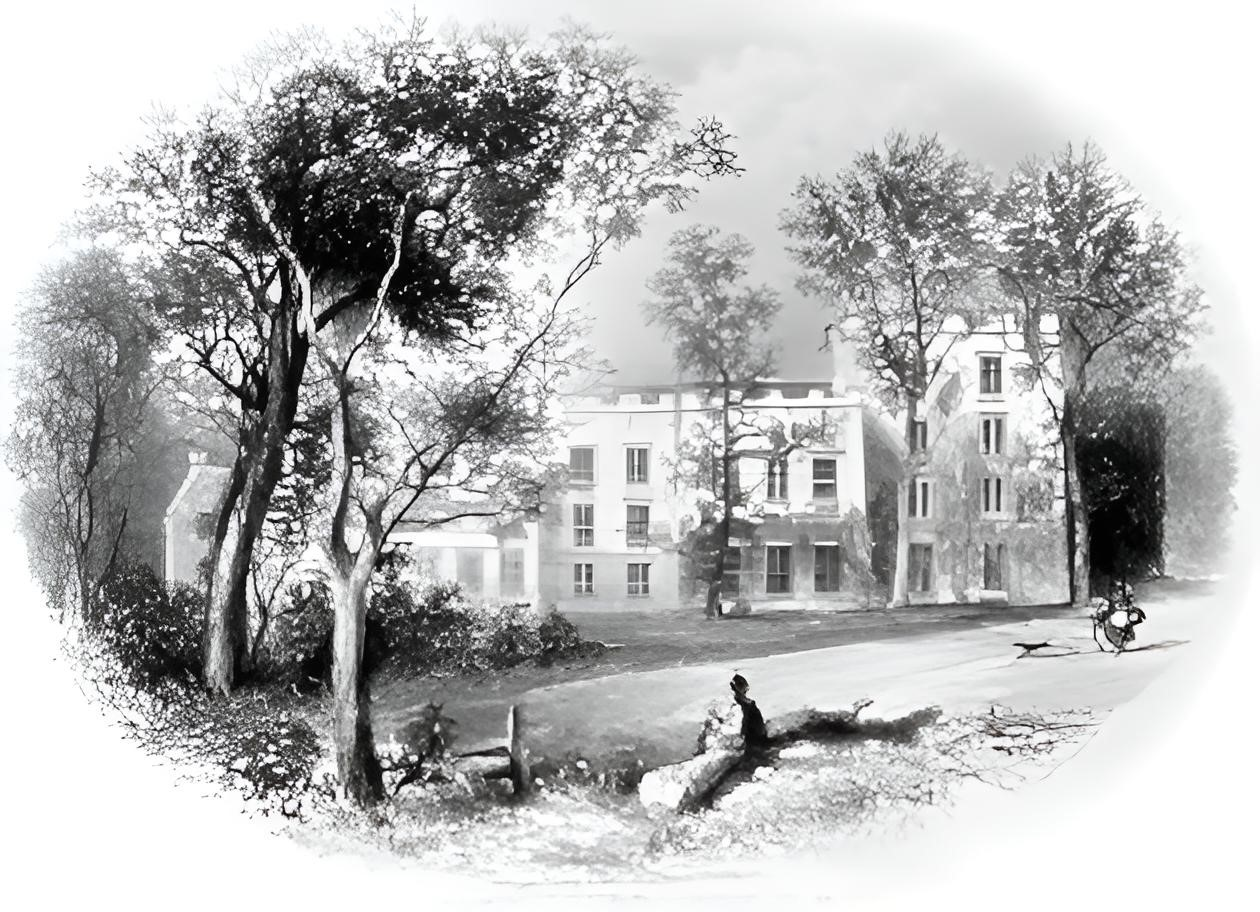
One of the residences of Yale's grandfather, Bishop George Lloyd, named Bishopscourt, Isle of Man

Thomas Yale was born on May 6, 1616, in Chester, England, to Anne Lloyd and Thomas Yale of Lichfield, members of the Yale family. His family was part of the British nobility, as members of the landed gentry, and were a cadet branch of the royal House of Mathrafal, through the Princes of Powys Fadog, Lords of Yale. His father was a London banker named Thomas Yale, and lived at the Plas Gronow estate in Wales, near Wrexham, now Erddig Hall.

The estate had been acquired by his grandfather, Chancellor David Yale, during the reign of Elizabeth Tudor, to whom his uncle, Chancellor Thomas Yale, was an Ambassador and Dean of the Arches. He was also the Chancellor to two heads of the Church of England, being Matthew Parker, Queen Anne Boleyn's chaplain, and Edmund Grindal, the past Bishop of London. His maternal grandfather was Lord Bishop George Lloyd, and lived at Bishop Lloyd's House and Bishopscourt, a residence that would become the summer home of the Earl of Derby, grandson of Edward de Vere, 17th Earl of Oxford. His great-grandfather, Judge John Lloyd, also cofounded the first Protestant college at the University of Oxford, along with Elizabeth Tudor, Lord William Cecil and Sir Nicholas Bacon.

During the 15th century, Yale's ancestors had led the last Welsh War of Independence as Prince of Wales, and lost to Henry V, also known by Shakespeare as Prince Hal. They became thereafter involved at court during the 16th century with the newly formed Church of England, founded by their cousins, the Tudors. This new group of Protestants, known as the Puritans, would be persecuted by the policies of King Charles I of England during the 17th century, forcing the Yales and other Protestant families to emigrate to the New World, in search of religious freedom and economic opportunities.

== Biography ==
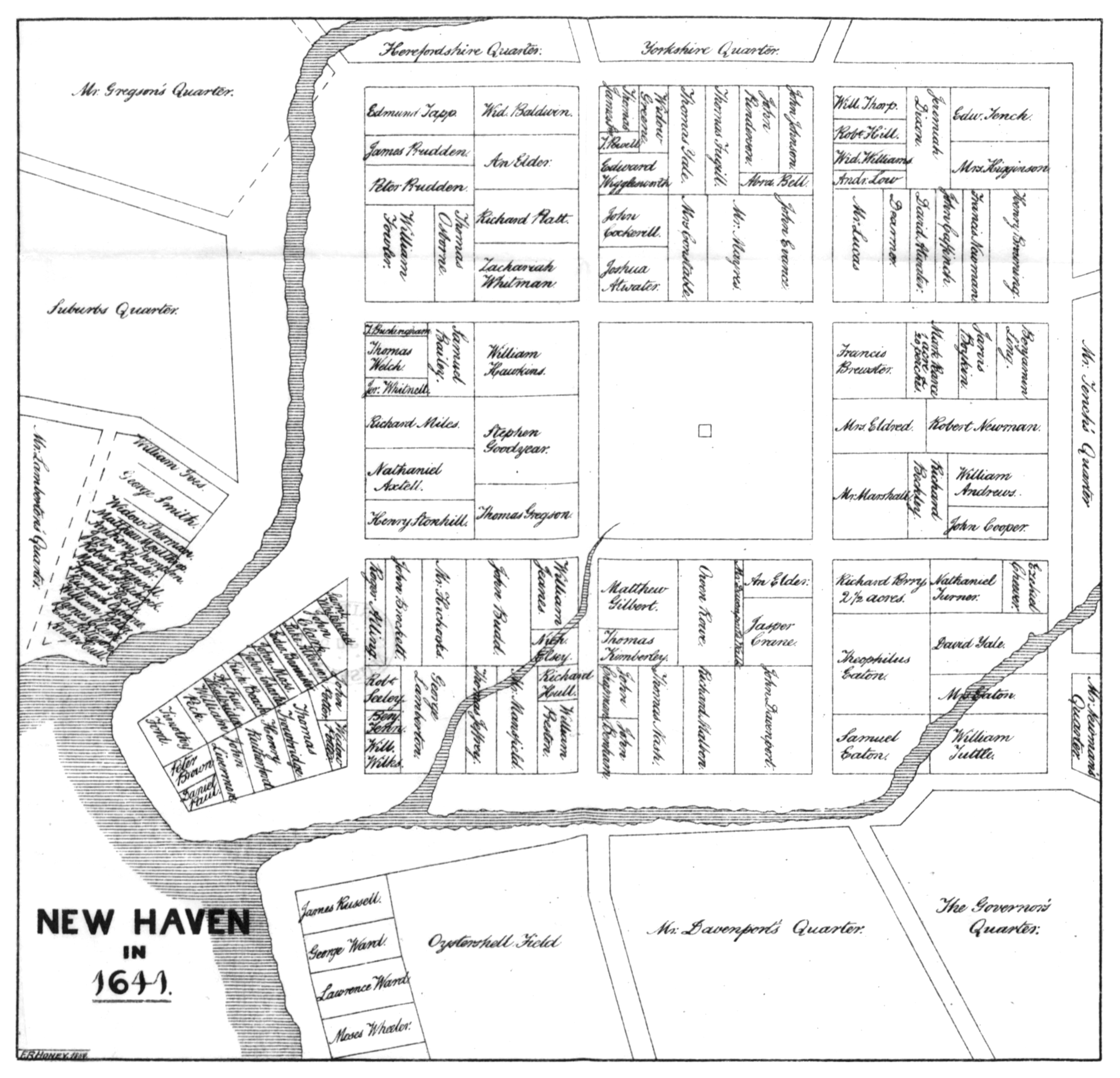
Estates of the Yales and Eatons in New Haven Colony in 1641, top center and bottom right

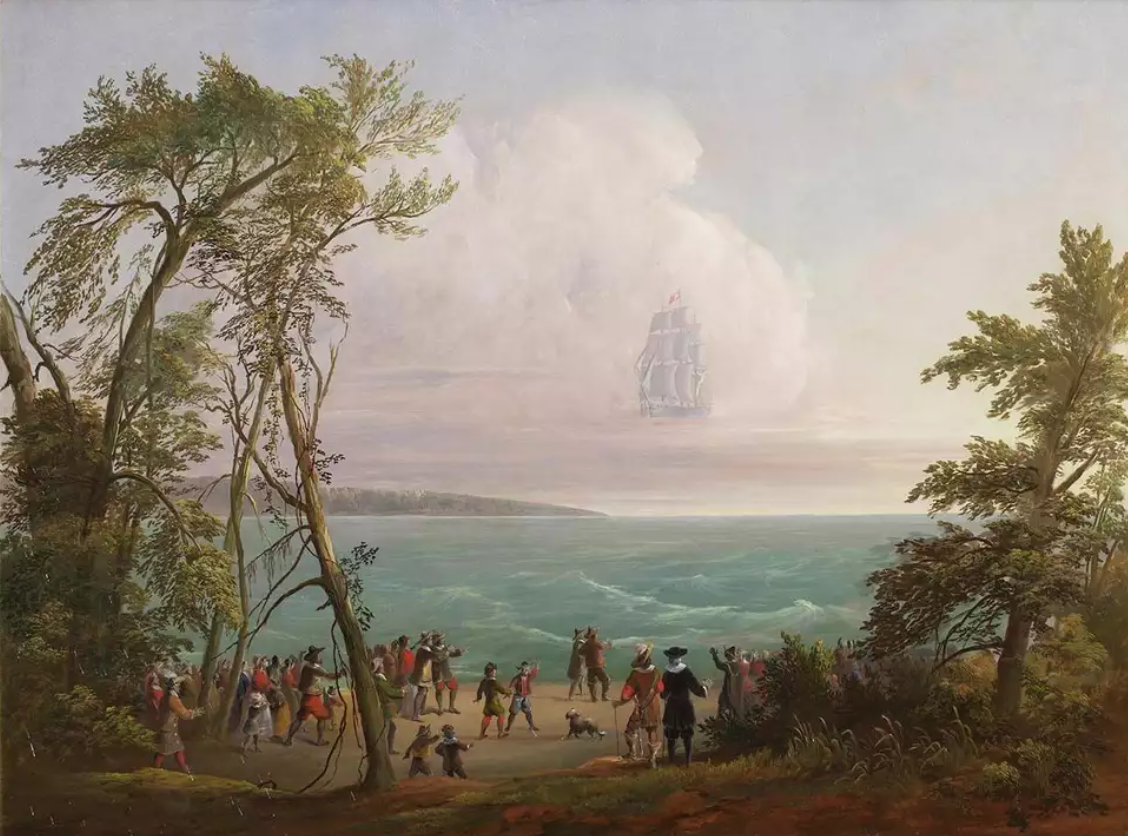
Vision of Eaton's Phantom Ship that never returned, New Haven Colony, 1647, by landscape painter Jesse Talbot

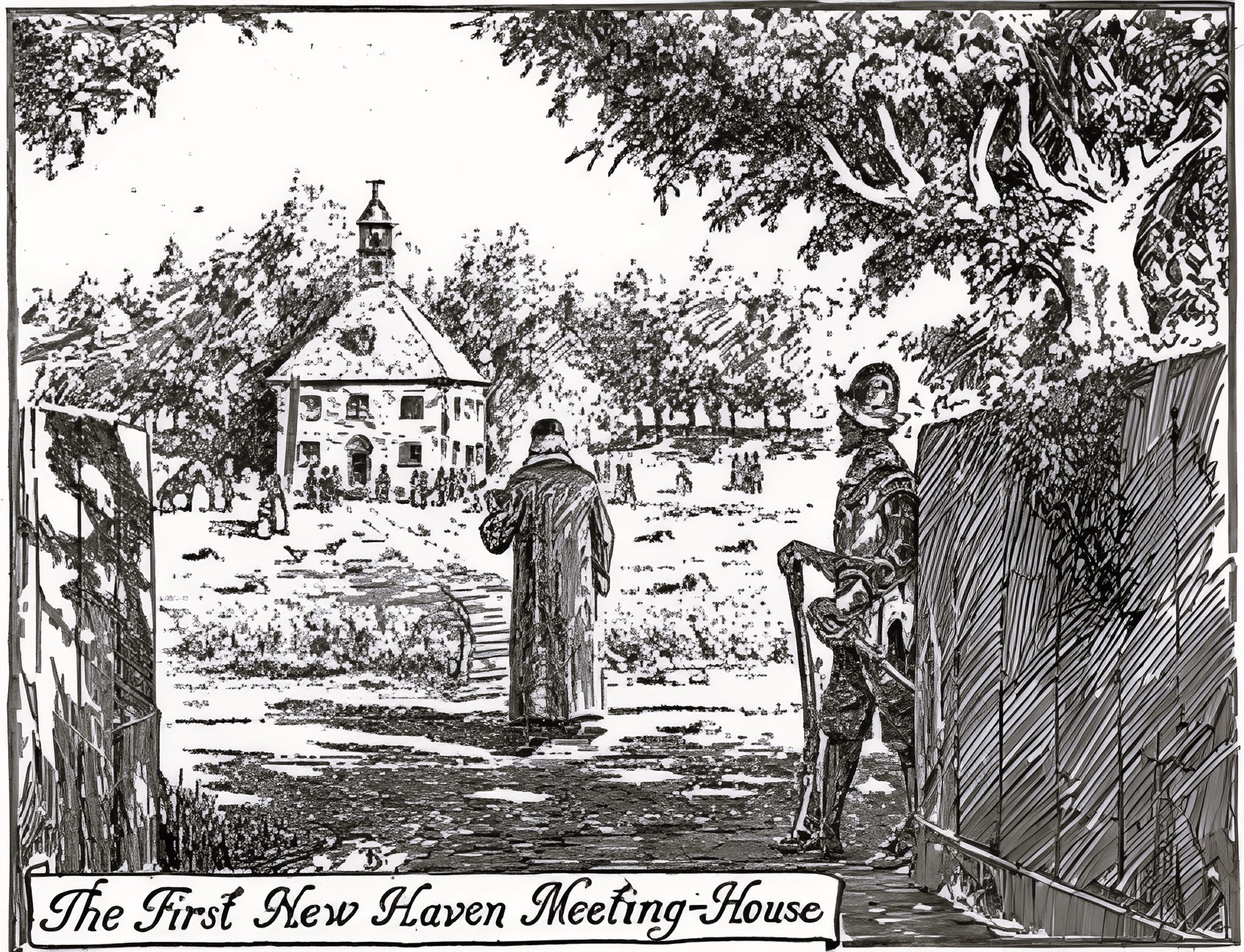
The First New Haven Meeting House, New Haven Colony

With the death of his father in 1619, Yale's mother remarried around 1625 to a wealthy Puritan merchant and Oxford graduate, named Theophilus Eaton. Eaton was previously the Ambassador to King James I of England at the court of King Christian IV of Denmark, and made his wealth as Deputy Governor of the Eastland Company in Britain. The family initially lived at the Saltonstalls's home in London. Yale's stepfather was a friend and business partner of Sir Richard Saltonstall, nephew of the Lord Mayor of London, Sir Richard Saltonstall.

Yale then became an apprentice to his stepfather in the Grocers Company in the City of London. During this time, Eaton started negotiations with a group of merchants, including Sir Richard Saltonstall, to obtain a royal charter for the colonization of Massachusetts.

They obtained the charter in 1628, and formed the Massachusetts Bay Colony, with Yale's stepfather elected as one the ten members to govern the colony by order of the King's Privy Council. As a result, Eaton became one the cofounders of the colony, including the city of Boston, and one of the bankers who financed the Puritan Migration to the Thirteen Colonies. He initially governed from England, having Gov. John Winthrop emigrate first to the colonies in 1630 aboard the Arbella, a ship that he co-owned, and lead the Winthrop Fleet.

In 1636, Harvard College would be created by a vote of the Great and General Court of the Massachusetts Bay Colony, with Eaton as one of its magistrates and financial managers from London. A year later, in 1637, Yale embarked with his family and stepfamily aboard the ship Hector to the New World, which included his mother, stepfather, stepuncle Samuel Eaton Sr., along with his Yale siblings and Eaton half and stepsiblings. They were among the wealthiest families to emigrate to New England before 1660, and would become the wealthiest family in New Haven Colony.

They arrived in Boston in 1637, and resettled in New Haven around 1638. They acquired the land from the Quinnipiack's Indians, renaming it New Haven Colony, and established a theocracy, where every member of the government had to be jointly a member of the Puritan church. Yale signed with his stepuncle Samuel Eaton Sr., and stepfather Theophilus Eaton, the Fundamental Agreement of the New Haven Colony on June 4, 1639, with his stepfather elected as 1st Governor of the Colony. New Haven Colony was the second settlement on Long Island Sound, preceded by Saybrook Colony, and the third in Connecticut. The colony grew with outposts in New York, New Jersey, Delaware, Pennsylvania and Connecticut, including the town of Greenwich, which Gov. Eaton cofounded with agent Robert Feake.

Yale's mother Anne Yale, and stepfather Gov. Eaton, built an English manor for the family, with over 20 fireplaces, and was among the largest in New England at the time. The structure would later be demolished and become the home of Eli Whitney, patriarch of the Whitney family, during the Industrial Revolution. Their religious leader in New Haven was Puritan minister John Davenport of London. He came from a prominent family; his brother, Francis Davenport, was the royal chaplain of Queen Henrietta Maria, aunt of Louis XIV of Versailles. The colony grew for its first decade, with territories added such as Milford, Guilford, Branford, Stamford and Southold, New York, on Long Island Sound, next to the Hamptons. They developed the fur industry and other ventures, including the Delaware Company, competing against the Dutch of New Netherland.

=== Later life ===
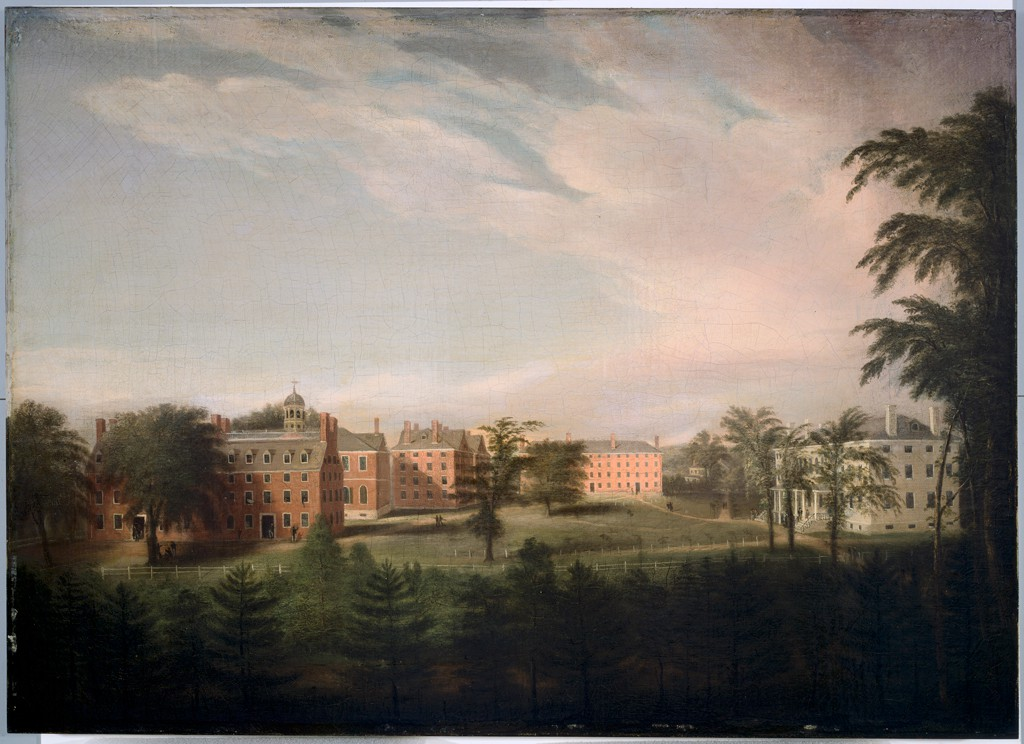
View of Harvard Yard, from the President's House, was founded by Yale's stepuncle, Nathaniel Eaton

In 1637, Yale's stepuncle, Nathaniel Eaton, was appointed the first head of Harvard, and after selecting the site, began the construction of the first Harvard College in 1638. He was awarded 500 acres of land in Cambridge, Massachusetts, in relation to his office, and was a friend of John Harvard, whom he met at Cambridge University in England. Eaton is credited for establishing the first printing press in British America under his tenure, and for the foundation of the Harvard Yard and Harvard Library in 1638. Yale's aunt, Eaton's wife, was running the housekeeping department of the college. While initially Harvard's first teacher, Eaton and his wife would be both dismissed in 1639 for bad behaviors, including beating his assistant teacher and serving bad food. He left the country, and ended up in debtor's prison at Southwark, London, John Harvard's birthplace.

In 1643, the Eaton/Yale family estates in New Haven, excluding those of both families in Britain, were valued for taxation around £4,200, or about 300 million dollars in 2024 money in relation to GDP. In the same year, Yale's stepfather and his brother-in-law, Gov. Edward Hopkins, formed the New England Confederation, a military alliance with other colonies against the attacks of Indians and Dutch from New York, named New Amsterdam at the time. On July 1, 1644, Yale took the Oath of fidelity with his wife, and were both assigned places in New Haven's meeting house. Yale then became attorney to Dr. Thomas Pell, the Lord of Pelham, New York, and brother of pioneer mathematician John Pell, colleague of René Descartes. In 1650, Yale's half-brother, magistrate Samuel Eaton, became one of the seven founders of the Harvard Corporation, and became one of its board directors and teachers.

After the death Gov. Theophilus Eaton in 1658, Yale went back to England with his mother, half-sister Hannah Eaton, his son Elihu, and brother David. He returned in 1659 to New Haven Colony. His brother David stayed in Cripplegate, in the City of London, and owned a merchant's counting house there until the Great Plague. In the same year, Yale received letters from his sister Hannah in England, from Hoghton Tower, the seat of her friend, Sir Richard Hoghton, making him her attorney. He then acquired land in North Haven and settled there around 1660. In April 1660, he was called upon with other men to settle the boundaries of a parcel of land bordering Connecticut, and in 1667, was involved in a land dispute with his brother-in-law, William Jones, later Deputy Governor of Connecticut. Yale and some others were assigned from 1665 to 1666 to collect the country rate for Connecticut.

In September 1667, September 1668 and September 1675, Yale and others were appointed to take the list of men's estates, which would be used by the town to assess the taxes rates. Yale became one of the principal men of the colony, and served as deputy to the Connecticut General Assembly, and as an alternate deputy in 1664. He also served in King Philip's War as a captain in the militia, defending the colony against the attacks of the Indians, which lasted from 1675 to 1678. Capt. Yale died on March 17, 1683, in Connecticut Colony, at 63 years old. His estate would later be part of the grounds of Yale College, on which the Old Campus was erected, and would later include a parcel owned by Benjamin Franklin.

== Family ==
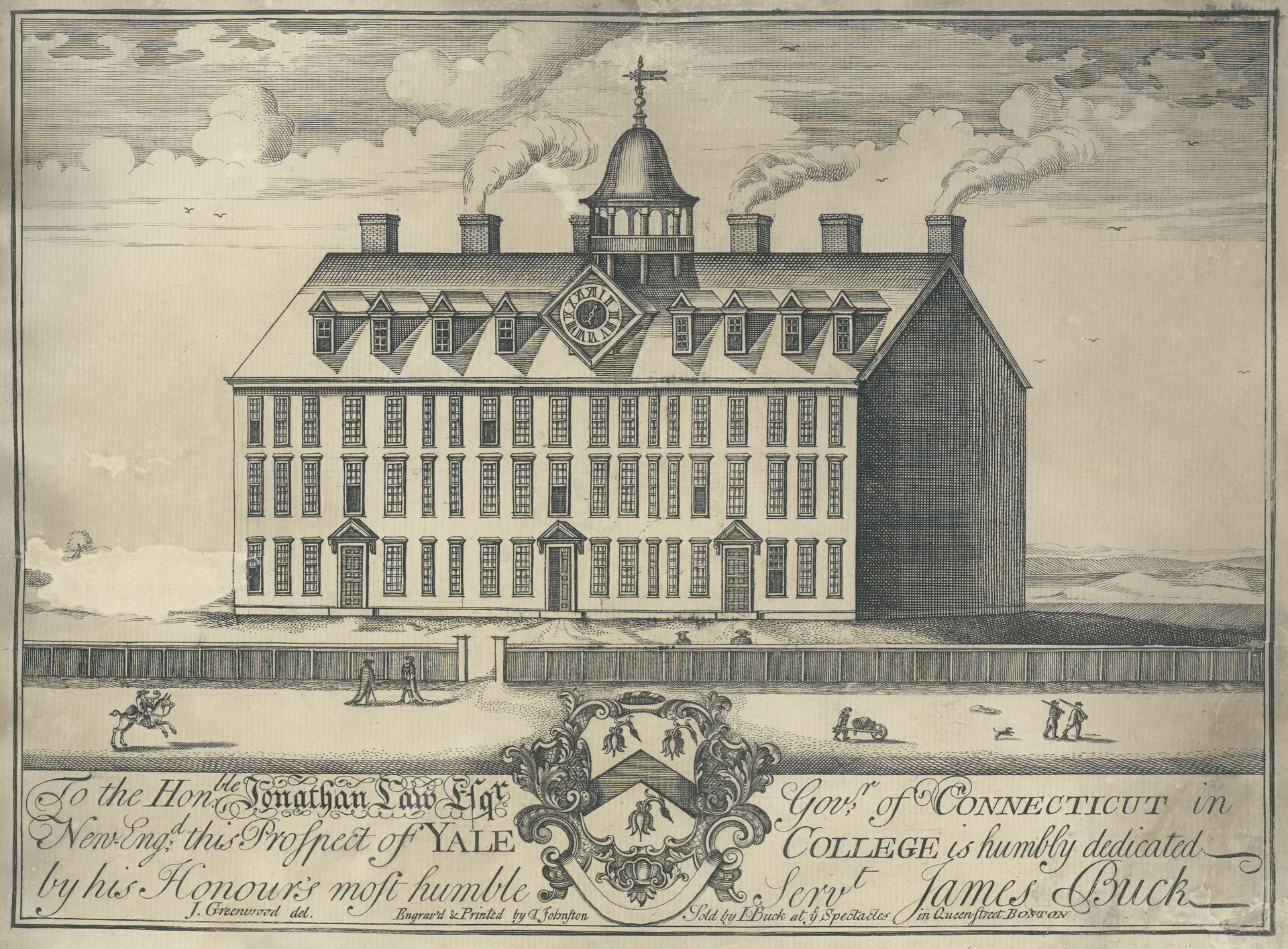
The first Yale College house, c. 1742, by artist John Greenwood

Yale's brother-in-law, Gov. Edward Hopkins, became the 2nd Governor of Connecticut, and served Oliver Cromwell in England as a Member of parliament and Lord Commissioner of the Admiralty. Hopkins's uncle, Sir Henry Lello, was Keeper of the Palace of Westminster, and Ambassador to the Ottoman Empire under the Tudors, dealing with Francesco Contarini, Doge of Venice, and Prince Michael the Brave, ruler of Wallachia, a territory previously ruled by Vlad Dracula about 100 years before.

Hopkins gave a part of his fortune to Harvard, and founded Hopkins Grammar School. The latter would have as one of its early students, Abraham Pierson, first head of Yale College and one of its cofounders. Another of Yale's brother-in-law was William Jones, Deputy Governor of Connecticut and Magistrate of the United Colonies. Jones hosted the regicides Whalley and Goffe during their hiding from Charles II of England in the Judges' Cave, along the Regicides Trail in New Haven.

Yale's stepsister married Judge Valentine Hill, a merchant and real estate developer, associate of Deputy Gov. William Aspinwall, who was involved in the Antinomian Controversy, and succeeded to Sir Henry Vane in his office. Yale's half brother, Samuel Eaton, cofounder of the Harvard Corporation, married the widow of Gov. John Haynes, 1st Governor of Connecticut. His half brother, Theophilus Jr., who lived on Park Lane, London, married a sister of Col. Maunsell, and was an apprentice in the Worshipful Company of Skinners, and attorney of King's Inns in Dublin, Ireland. Theophilus Jr.'s father-in-law, Navy captain Thomas Maunsell, was an Oxford graduate, cousin of Sir Thomas Mansell, 1st Baronet, and fought against the Spanish Armada. They were also members of the House of Mansel of Thorpe Malsor, a cousin branch of the Mansels of Margam Castle.

Yale's nephew, David Yale, became a wealthy Boston merchant and attorney to Robert Rich, 2nd Earl of Warwick, brother of the Gov. of Windsor Castle, the Earl of Holland. David was married to Ursula Knight, who was a sister-in-law of minister John Stoughton, stepfather of philosopher Ralph Cudworth. Her nephew was Gov. William Stoughton, chief judge of the Salem Witch Trials, and patron of the 1st Stoughton Hall at Harvard. Her sister-in-law, Mary Hubbard, was the sister of Rev. William Hubbard, who graduated from the first class of Harvard, and the grandaunt of Mary Whittingham, who married Gov. Saltonstall, and Elizabeth, who married Col. Appleton Jr., son of Col. Appleton Sr., member of the Appleton family.

David Yale lived on Scollay Square, at the past home of Gov. John Endecott, and became the father of Gov. Elihu Yale, early benefactor and namesake of Yale College. Harvard reverend, Cotton Mather, had been asking him for donations, at the time, an art collector and member of the Royal Society with Isaac Newton. His other nephew, Thomas Yale, became Ambassador to Narai the Great, King of Siam, representing the British East India Company during the Anglo-Siamese War, led by his brother Elihu.

=== Marriage ===
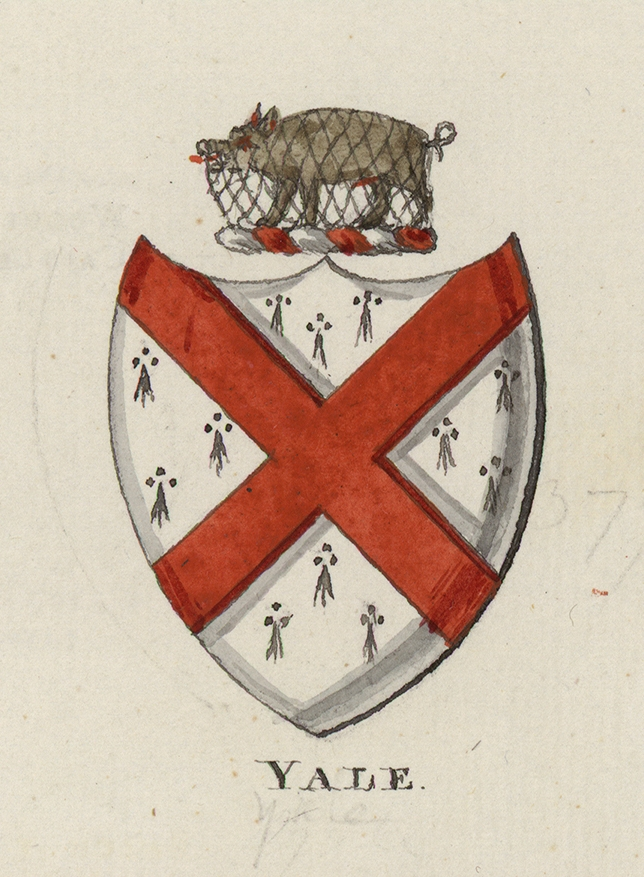
Coat of arms of the Yales of Plas Gronow, it became the arms of Yale College with small changes

Thomas Yale married to Mary Turner, daughter of Capt. Nathaniel Turner, who died at sea as captain of the Phantom Ship in 1646. His stepfather, Gov. Eaton, had commissioned the ship with Thomas Gregson, and Deputy Gov. Stephen Goodyear, patriarch of the Goodyear family. The ship, built for ocean travel, never reached its destination, and sank in the Atlantic, along with its passengers and cargo of wheat, peas, hides, beaver, pelts and manuscripts. A second ship would be built in 1646, and a third in 1648.

The couple had 9 children, of which Yale's daughter, Abigail Yale, married Maj. Moses James Mansfield, judge and namesake of Mansfield, Connecticut. Yale's daughter, Mary Yale, married Capt. Joseph Ives, one of the founders of Wallingford, Connecticut, and became the ancestor of Capt. Job Yale, who served in the 10th Regiment of the Connecticut Line during the American War of Independence. Yale's daughter, Elizabeth Yale, married Joseph Pardee, and were the parents of Lt. John Pardee. His son, Capt. Thomas Yale, cofounded Wallingford, Connecticut.

Yale's son, Nathaniel Yale, married Ruth Bishop, daughter of Deputy Gov. James Bishop. Nathaniel was also the son-in-law of Lt. John Peck, son of Deacon William Peck, trustee of Hopkins School, and became the ancestor of Maj. Gen. Hezekiah Barnes of the Revolutionary War. Yale's daughter, Hannah Yale, married Lt. Emos Talmadge, and became the grandmother of Abraham Hemingway, ancestor of writer Ernest Hemingway.

As the American patriarch of the Yale family, early notable descendants of Capt. Thomas Yale included : Capt. Theophilus Yale, Capt. Elihu Yale, Rev. Elisha Yale, manufacturer Burrage Yale, merchant William Yale, abolitionist Barnabas Yale, Rev. Cyrus Yale, abolitionist Levi Yale, inventor Linus Yale Sr., fur merchant James Murray Yale, newspaper entrepreneur Moses Yale Beach, and many others.
