= Thomas Yale =

Thomas Yale may refer to:

- Thomas Yale (chancellor) (1525/6–1577), Chancellor of Lord Archbishop Matthew Parker
- Thomas Yale (New Haven Colony) (1616–1683), captain and cofounder of New Haven Colony
- Thomas Yale (Wallingford) (1647–1736), captain and cofounder of Wallingford, Connecticut
