= Franklin Johnson House =

Historic house in Connecticut, United States

- U.S. National Register of Historic Places
- U.S. Historic district – Contributing property
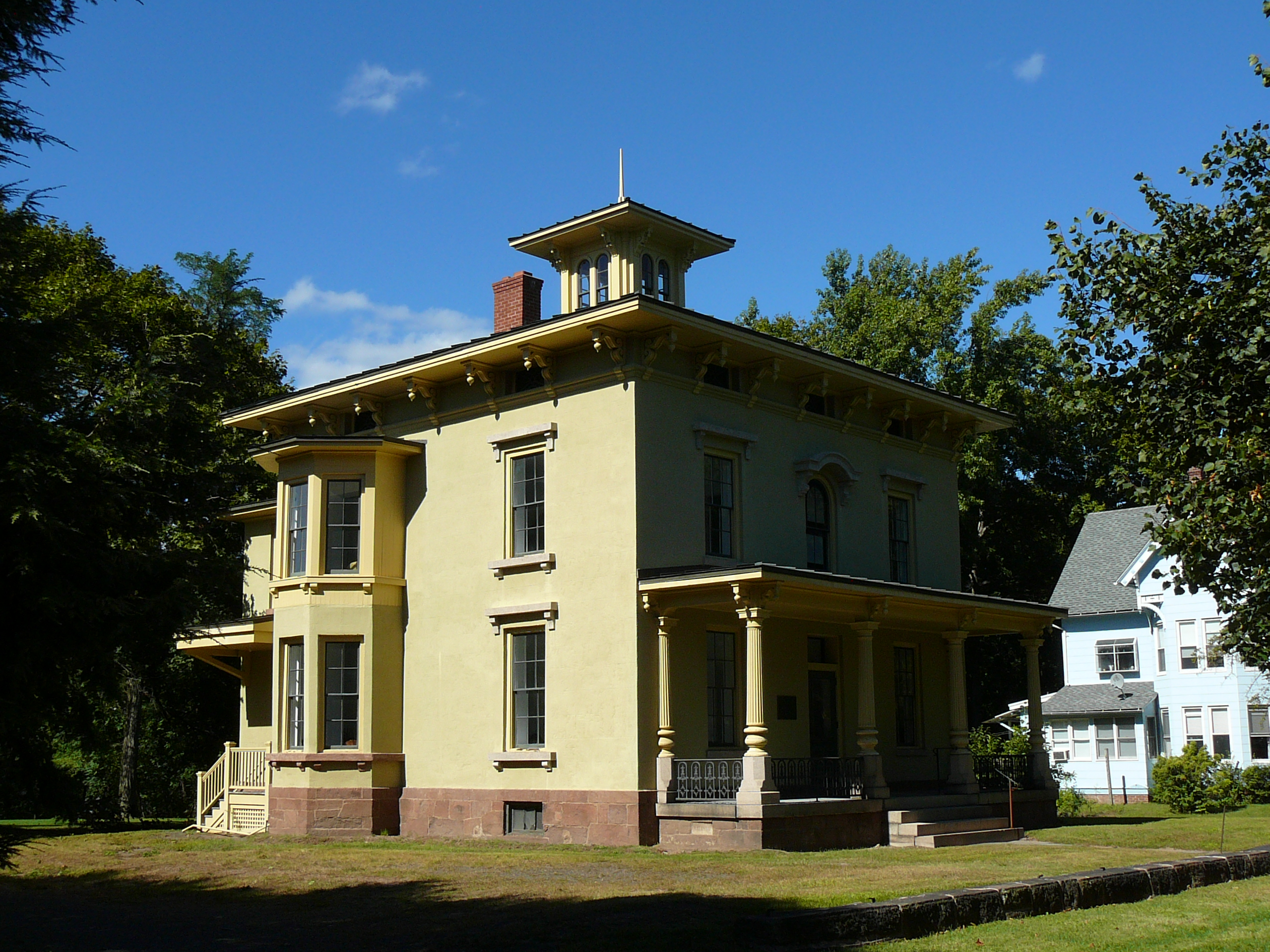

- Location within Connecticut Location within the United States
- Location: 153 South Main Street, Wallingford, Connecticut
- Coordinates: 41°27′06″N 72°49′15″W
- Area: less than one acre
- Built: 1866
- Architectural style: Italianate
- Part of: Wallingford Center Historic District (ID93001242)
- NRHP reference No.: 98001420

Significant dates
- Added to NRHP: November 23, 1998
- Designated CP: December 2, 1993

The Franklin Johnson House is a historic house at 153 South Main Street in Wallingford, Connecticut. Built in 1866, it is a distinctive local example of Italianate architecture. It was listed on the National Register of Historic Places in 1998. It is now home to the American Silver Museum, which is generally open by appointment or on special occasions.

== Description and history ==
The Franklin Johnson House is located in a residential area south of Wallingford's central business district on the west side of South Main Street south of Prince Street. It is a 2 1/2-story masonry structure, built out of brick that has been finished with stucco-like concrete scored to resemble stone. It is covered by a low-pitch hip roof, at whose center is a square cupola. The roof eaves are decorated with large carved brackets, and the cupola, a reproduction of the building's original one (lost in the New England hurricane of 1938) also exhibits Italianate features. The main facade is three bays wide, and its first floor is sheltered by a porch with tapered and fluted round columns separated by iron balustrades. Windows are set in rectangular openings that have pink granite lintels and sills. To the rear of the property there is a multi-seat outhouse, built with stylistically similar materials.

The house was built in 1866 for Franklin Johnson, a local man active in real estate. It remained in residential use until about 1980, at which time it was converted to professional office use. It has since been adapted to house the American Silver Museum. The house is a distinctive example of Italianate architecture, in the style promoted by New Haven architect Henry Austin; its designer is unknown.

== See also ==
- National Register of Historic Places listings in New Haven County, Connecticut
