= Levi Yale =

Connecticut abolitionist and politician (1792–1872)

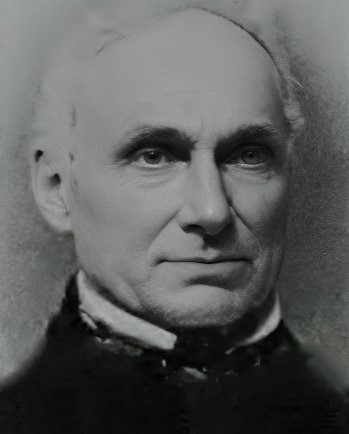
- Levi Yale
- Born: April 11, 1792; Meriden, Connecticut, U.S.
- Died: February 19, 1872 (aged 79); Meriden, Connecticut, U.S.
- Occupations: Farmer; Politician; Abolitionist
- Spouse: Abigail Ellen Bacon
- Children: Harriet Ellen Yale; Emma Louisa Yale; Levi Bacon Yale
- Parents: Joel Yale (father); Esther Clark (mother)

Levi Yale (April 11, 1792 – February 19, 1872), of Meriden, Connecticut, was a politician, abolitionist, and Underground Railroad agent. He held state and local elected offices and was appointed Meriden postmaster. He co-founded the abolitionist Connecticut Liberty Party and frequently ran as that party's candidate for lieutenant governor.

== Early life ==
Levi Yale was born April 11, 1792, to Joel Yale and Esther Clark, members of the Yale family. He was the oldest of a large family of children; at age 12 he became his mother's main support, following his father's death. At 16 he began teaching school in the winter and farming his mother's land in the summer.

== Career ==
In 1821, Yale was elected a member of the Connecticut State House. He was postmaster during the Jackson and Van Buren presidencies and was frequently elected as a town Justice of the Peace.

In the fall of 1837, Yale, Elisha Cowles, Julius Pratt, and others, invited abolitionist lecturer Rev. Henry G. Ludlow to speak at the Center Congregational church in Meriden. Anti-abolionists attempted to prevent the meeting from being held and organized a riot when they were unable to stop it. Stones and eggs were thrown at the attendees. Levi Yale and two others acted as body-guards, protecting and escorting Reverend Ludlow out of the church.

Yale's home was a station of the Underground Railroad, and he has been described as "a man of very pronounced views against slavery, and one who had the courage of his convictions." Fugatives found "food and harbor" at his farmhouse, and he helped conduct them from New Haven to Springfield.

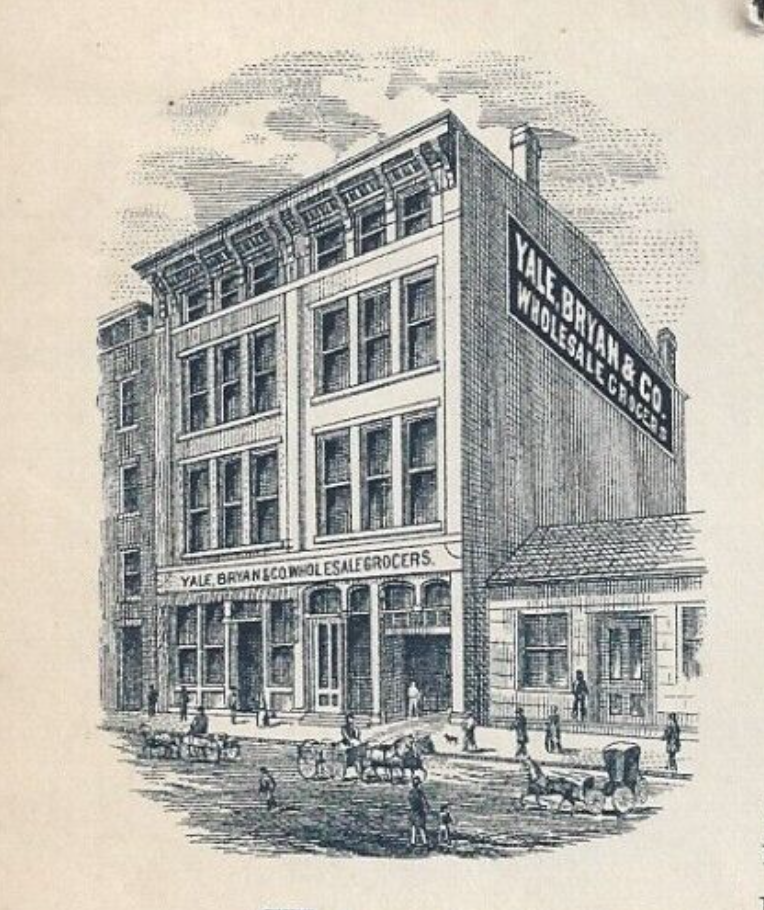
The wholesale grocer store of Levi Yale's nephew, Edward P. Yale, named Yale, Bryan & Co., in New Haven, Connecticut, 1888

In 1841, Yale co-founded the Connecticut Liberty Party, presiding at the Political Anti-Slavery Convention that established the party in the state and nominated its first candidates. As president of the convention, he wrote, signed and published in newspapers a letter requesting the President of the United States, John Tyler, to emancipate his slaves.

In 1841, and from 1843 to 1849, Yale was the Liberty party candidate for lieutenant governor of Connecticut. He was elected first selectman of Meriden from 1845 to 1848, and then from 1852 to 1855. In 1851 he lost the race for Meriden Judge of Probate. In 1856 he was again elected to the state house.

Yale was a member of the committee that build Meriden's town hall and was among the officers that incorporated the Meriden Savings Bank. He was a Congregationalist and was among the members who formed Center Congregational after First Congregational moved to a new location.

== Personal life ==
Levi Yale was married to Abigail Ellen Bacon, of Middletown, Connecticut. They had three children together, two daughters, Harriet Ellen and Emma Louisa, and a son named Levi Bacon Yale. Levi B. was a Republican, Prohibition candidate, nominated for Senator in the 6th District in 1900, and was an active member of the Congregational Church.

He was a great-grandson of Capt. Thomas Yale of Wallingford., and his uncle, Thomas Yale, was a soldier during the American War of Independence. He was a cousin of Congressman Jonathan Brace and Aetna life insurance founder Thomas Kimberly Brace, as well as of Senators Kenneth S. White and John Baldwin.
