= William Jones (deputy governor) =

American politician

24th Deputy Governor Connecticut
- In office 1692–1698
- Preceded by: James Bishop
- Succeeded by: Robert Treat

Personal details
- Born: March 20, 1624 London, Middlesex, England
- Died: October 17, 1706 (aged 82)
- Spouse: Hannah Eaton Jones

William Jones (March 20, 1624 - October 17, 1706) was an English lawyer who emigrated to the United Colonies of New England and became the twenty-fourth Deputy Governor of the Colony of Connecticut. He notably hosted at his home the regicides Whalley and Goffe, family members of Oliver Cromwell.

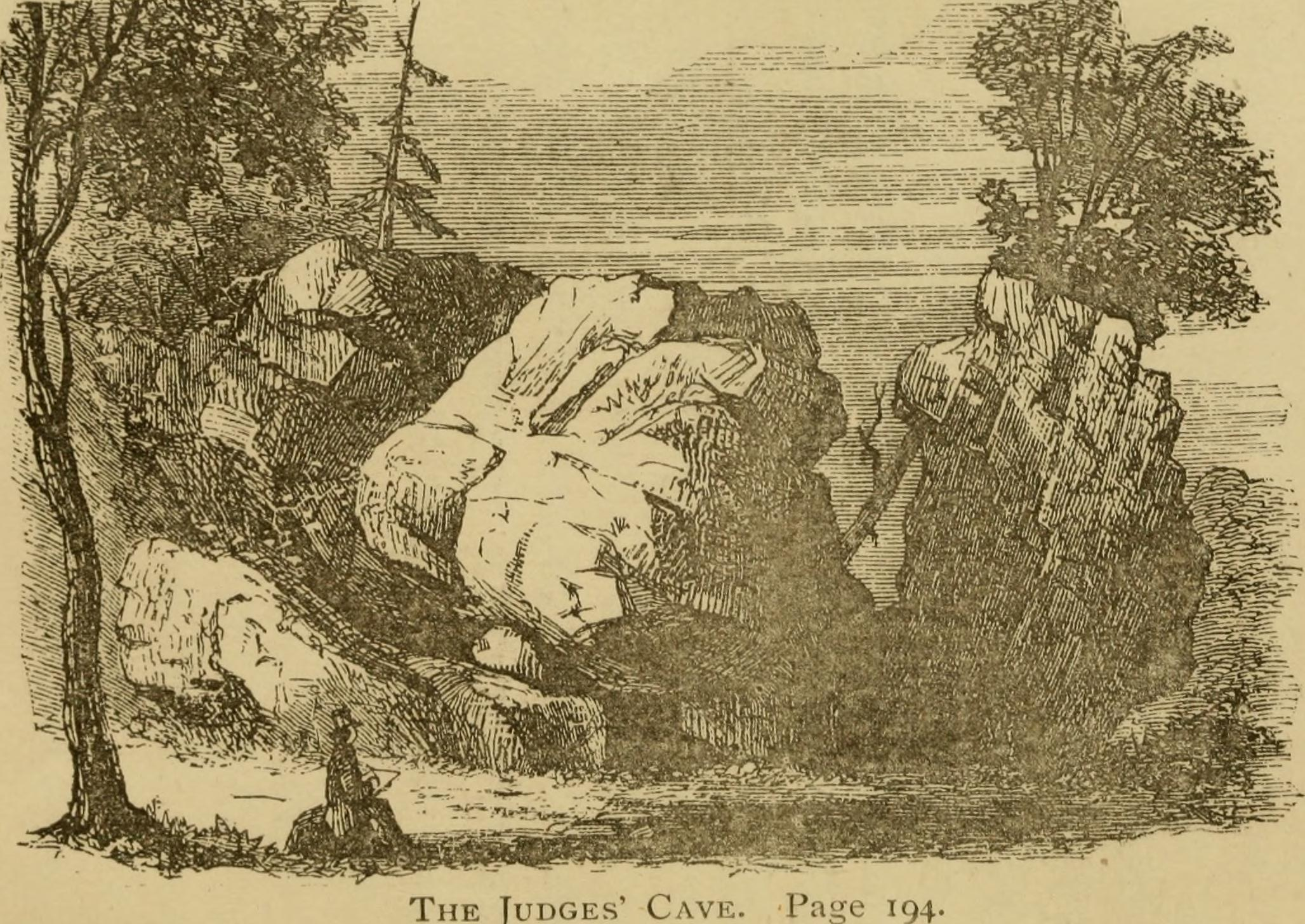
The Judges' Cave of the regicides, Deputy Gov. Jones hosted the judges Edward Whalley and William Goffe at his home in New Haven

== Biography ==
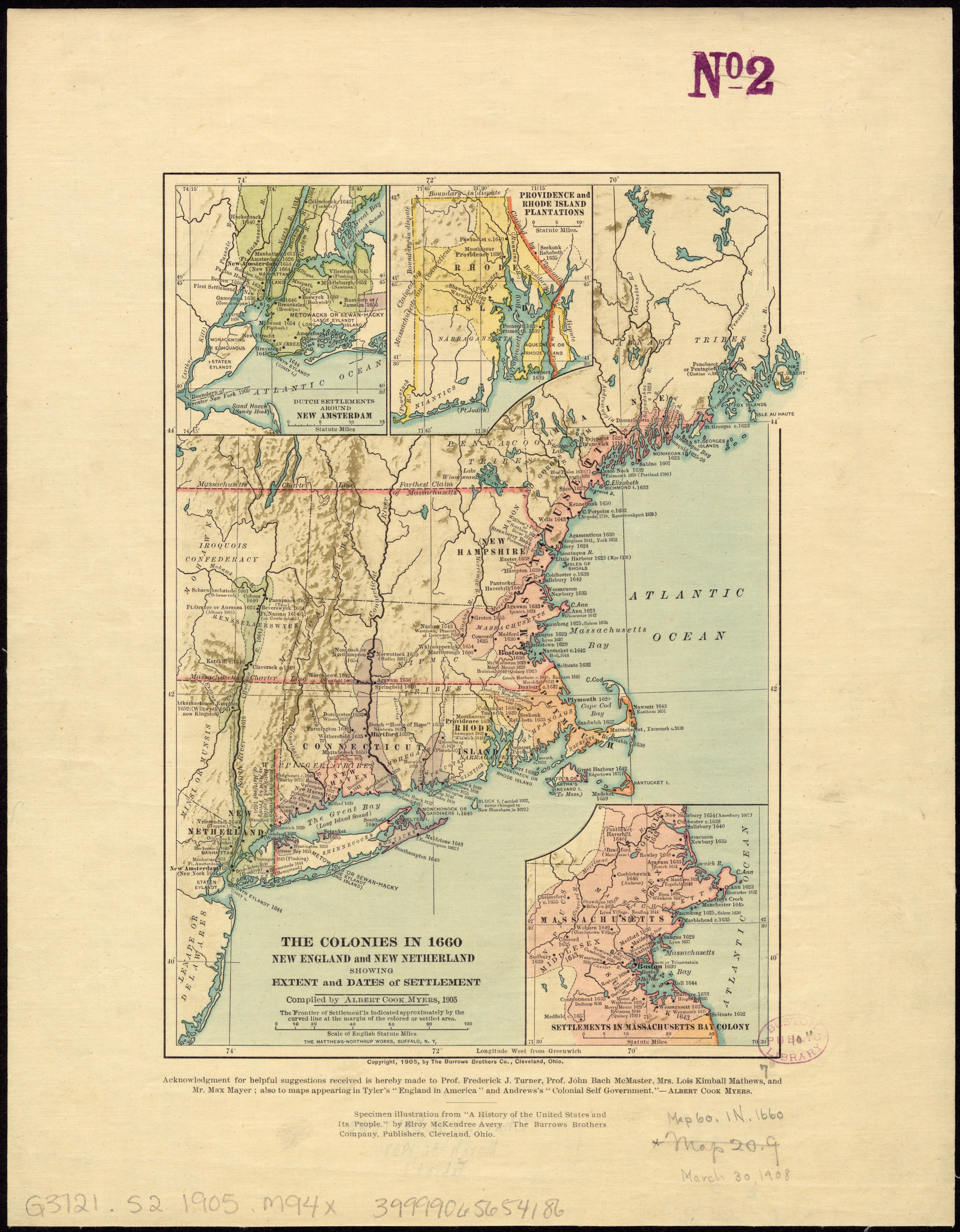
Map of the New England Colonies, 1660

Jones was born in London, Middlesex, England. He became a lawyer at Westminster and married Hannah Eaton, daughter of Governor Eaton, on July 4, 1659, in St. Andrew's Church, Holborn, by Reverend Joseph Rowe. They arrived in Boston, Massachusetts, on July 27, 1660, in company with the regicides, judges Edward Whalley and William Goffe, both Generals and family members of Oliver Cromwell.

They moved to New Haven in August of the same year; took possession of the mansion of Governor Theophilus Eaton, and continued to live there until their deaths. His brothers-in-law were Capt. Thomas Yale and David Yale, stepsons of Gov. Eaton, while his nephew was Capt. Thomas Yale of Wallingford. Jones was made a freeman in 1661.

One of the most interesting facts in his life was his connection with the two judges, Whalley and Goffe. While they hid in New Haven in the Judges' Cave, Jones' house was their place of refuge for eleven days. Reverend John Davenport too aided in hiding them .

Jones and his wife Hannah had thirteen children, four of whom died their first year; Theophilus, Samuel, Rebecca and Abigail; one of whom died at three years, Deodat. The eight who reached maturity were William, Nathaniel, Hannah, Elizabeth, Sarah, John, Isaac, and Susanna.

== Career ==
For twenty-eight years, Jones was elected to the office of Assistant, or Magistrate, of the United Colonies of New England. This office combined the duties of a Magistrate with those of a Senator, or member of the Superior House of the Legislature, except during 1685, when Governor Andrews of New York suspended the government of Connecticut.

Jones was elected Deputy-Governor of New Haven in 1664. On the union of this Colony with Connecticut, May 11, 1665, he was chosen one of the magistrates. In July 1691, following the death of James Bishop, Jones was elected Lieutenant Governor by the General Assembly. He was elected to the same office by the freemen in 1692, and was elected each year from 1692 until he retired on May 12, 1698.

Chosen Lieutenant Governor of the Colony of Connecticut in 1689 and reelected each of the next five years, Jones was one of the trustees granted the patent of the city of New Haven by the General Assembly of Connecticut on October 20, 1704.

== Death ==
Jones died on October 17, 1706, in New Haven, Connecticut at the age of 82. Jones and his wife Hannah were buried near her father, Governor Eaton of New Haven, Connecticut.

Political offices q
Preceded by James Bishop	24th Deputy Governor of the Colony of Connecticut; 1692 - May 12, 1698	Succeeded by Robert Treat
