= Samuel Simpson House =

Historic house in Connecticut, United States

- U.S. National Register of Historic Places
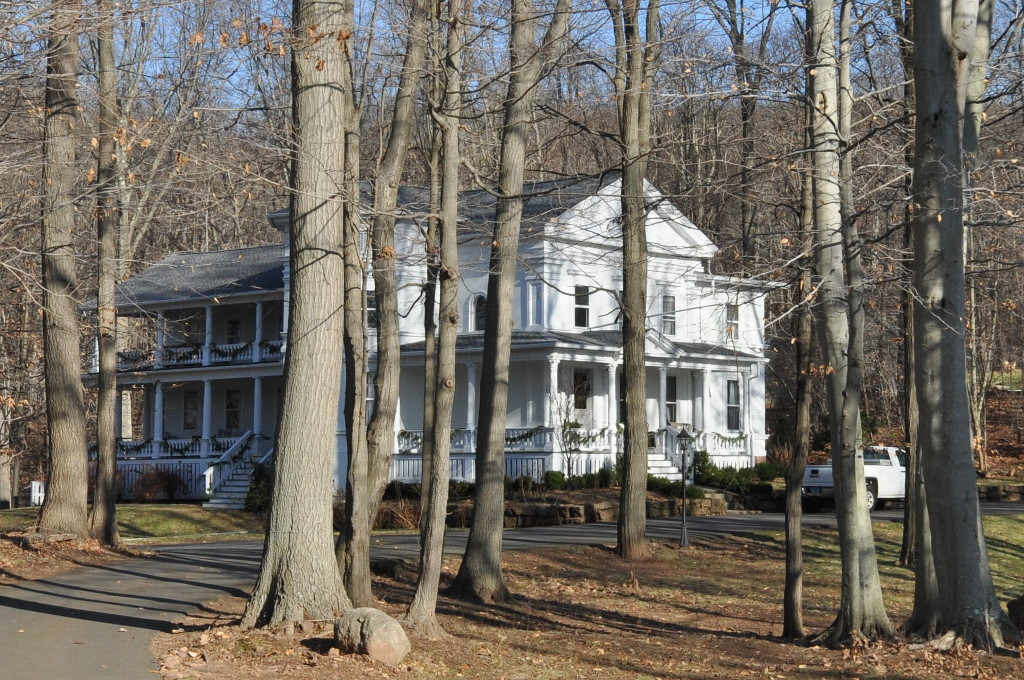

- Location within Connecticut Location within the United States
- Location: 1370 Scard Road, Wallingford, Connecticut
- Coordinates: 41°26′24″N 72°45′29″W
- Area: less than one acre
- Built: 1838
- Architect: Henry Austin
- Architectural style: Greek Revival, Renaissance
- NRHP reference No.: 86001334
- Added to NRHP: June 18, 1986

The Samuel Simpson House (also known as the Taber House) is a historic house at 1370 Scard Road in Wallingford, Connecticut. Built in 1838 by John Meigs Hall, it was the home of 19th century industrialist and philanthropist Samuel Simpson. Some of the house's structural beams, repurposed from an older building in the same location, date back to the 1600s. Around 1867, the home was extensively redesigned by renowned New Haven, Connecticut architect Henry Austin, giving it Renaissance Revival characteristics.

The house was listed in the National Register of Historic Places in 1986.

== History ==
=== Simpson-Taber Residence ===
The house originally stood at 216 North Main Street in downtown Wallingford. Simpson, a silver manufacturer, partnered with Robert Wallace in the firm of R. Wallace & Sons, the forerunner of Wallace Silversmiths Inc. He was later president of Simpson, Hall, Miller, & Co., which was one of the founding companies of the International Silver Company. Simpson was a noted philanthropist and benefactor to Wallingford, and his house was a prominent fixture in the town's downtown area.

Simpson's great-granddaughter, Margaret Tibbets Taber (1891-1985), later ran a bookstore in the house. Known for her philanthropy and dedication to the public library, Taber sold the property to the town in 1978 under the condition that the land be used for library purposes.

=== Preservation Debate and Relocation ===
In 1982, the Wallingford Public Library moved from its original location at 60 North Main Street to a newly constructed building on the former Taber property, alongside the Simpson House. The library Board of Managers, reluctant to use library funds for maintenance of the aging mansion, suggested demolishing the house and repurposing the site as a garden and outdoor reading area. In 1984, given a three-month deadline to avoid demolition, community members formed the Simpson-Taber Residence Preservation Committee. The committee sought to raise donations to keep the Taber house in its current location and use it as a meeting place for local community groups. In a 7–2 vote, the Town Council rejected the committee's plans, but agreed to consider proposals to move the house to a new location rather than demolish it.

In 1987, a local developer, Thomas Solinsky, purchased the house from the town for one dollar and had it moved to its current location on Scard Road. A portion of the original wrought iron fence remains on the original property outside of the library building.

== Appearances in pop culture ==
In 2012, the Samuel Simpson House served as the main location in director A.D. Calvo's film The Midnight Game.

== See also ==
- National Register of Historic Places listings in New Haven County, Connecticut
