= John Brockett (American colonist) =

- Born: Hertfordshire, England
- Died: July 29, 1690 (aged 79); Wallingford, Connecticut
- Occupations: Soldier, Surgeon, Surveyor

John Brockett (died March 12, 1690) was born in England. He was one of the early English settlers in the area of New Haven, Connecticut, and later helped found the town of Wallingford which he represented in the Connecticut General Assembly.

== History ==
=== 1630s ===
He emigrated on June 26, 1637, to Boston, Massachusetts Bay Colony. John Brockett was the first Brockett in America when he arrived. He came on the ship "Hector" with Reverend John Davenport. There exist no passenger list of the ship ''Hector' that lists the passengers, including the name of John Brockett'The passengers on board that ship were "gentlemen in wealth and character, with their servants and household effects." Most were from London and engaged as merchants and commercial businesses. Their arrival was joyously hailed at Boston for they were the wealthiest of immigrants to New England at that time. Shortly after arriving, however, a small group led by Theophilus Eaton decided not to join the Massachusetts Bay Colony, but to form a new colony. They explored the coast along Long Island Sound and chose a site that became New Haven Colony. Seven individuals wintered there to hold the site. Others arrived on 13 April 1638, including Davenport and John Brockett. They purchased land from the Quinnipiac Indians and formed a government based upon strict religious principles. Brockett moved on 13 April 1638 to New Haven Colony. Brockett was a signer of the first covenant of New Haven and became a leader among the founders of New Haven. His name appears more often on early town records than anyone but Eaton. In 1639, Brockett surveyed an area that is now the center of New Haven and laid out the borders with such accuracy that the same borders are used to this day.

=== 1640s ===
By 1640 a complete government had been established and the settlement, originally called Quinnipiac, was renamed New Haven. The town plan was based on a grid of nine squares. In accordance with old English custom, the central square, now the Green, was designated a public common. A copy of the 1641 Brockett map as shown in "Three Centuries of New Haven, 1638-1938" by Rollin G. Osterweis, published in 1953 by Yale Univ. Press.

By 1641 New Haven had grown into a community of approximately 800. The survey map of 1641 was laid out by John Brockett. These prosperous immigrants formed a new government of a town they called New Haven. The residents must have had confidence in Brockett's judgment as he was often appointed by the Planters to a committee to resolve cases of differing opinion regarding settlers and Indians.

John Brockett was involved in the military over quite a long period. In 1643, he was fined a shilling for coming late to military training.

=== 1650s ===
In 1654, John Brockett was appointed surgeon among a group of soldiers who had aligned themselves against the Dutch who settled along the Hudson River.

=== 1660s ===
In 1660, he led an effort to resolve a border dispute between Connecticut Colony (in Hartford) and New Haven Colony. He moved in 1667 to Elizabethtown, Union, NJ. He moved in 1669 to Wallingford, New Haven Colony.

In 1667 Brockett was commissioned by the Governor of New Jersey to survey the bounds of Elizabethtown, which has since become the City of Elizabeth, NJ. This effort required him to temporarily reside in that city. Brockett received an allotment of land for his efforts that he sold when he left Elizabethtown in 1670. While living in Elizabethtown, the townspeople chose him and John Ogden were chosen to represent Elizabethtown in its House of Burgess.

In 1669, the Colony of New Haven began planning Wallingford village. The area was infested with thousands of wolves that killed cattle and sheep. John Brockett and his son Samuel were among the first 100 persons to settle there. Each of the 38 settlers were allotted land. Brockett received lot #1 of 12 acres (49,000 m^{2}) and his son John received 8 acres (32,000 m^{2}). John was elected to public offices and became one of the leading men of the town. He eventually represented Wallingford in the General Assembly.

=== 1670s ===
He was Deputy to the General Court between 1671 and 1685 in Wallingford, New Haven Colony. He served several nonconsecutive terms during this period. He served as a surgeon between 1675 and 1676 in King Philip's War (1675–1676) in which 600 colonialists were killed at a cost of over $1,000,000.

=== 1690s ===
He signed a will on 3 March 1690 in Wallingford, New Haven, CT. He died on 12 March 1690 in Windsor, Hartford, CT. He was a surveyor, soldier, civil engineer, surgeon.

== See also ==
- New Haven, Connecticut
- History of Connecticut
