= Wallingford Center Historic District =

Historic district in Connecticut, United States

- U.S. National Register of Historic Places
- U.S. Historic district
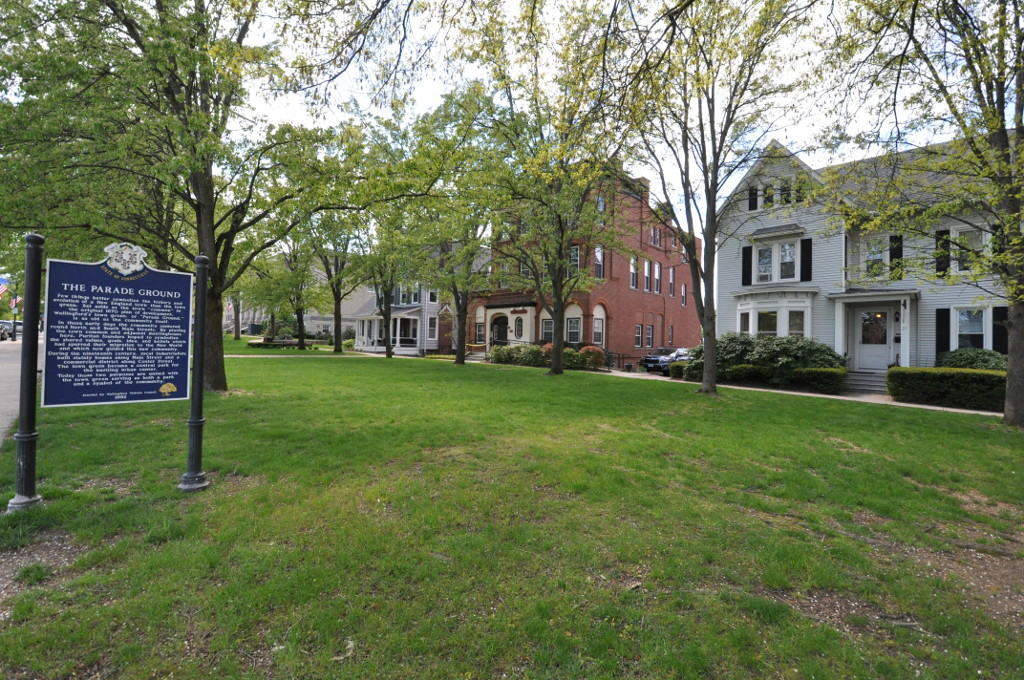
- View of the town's historic parade ground and adjacent houses

- Location within Connecticut Location within the United States
- Location: Roughly, Main Street from Ward Street to Church Street, Wallingford, Connecticut
- Coordinates: 41°27′11″N 72°49′14″W
- Area: 31 acres (13 ha)
- Architectural style: Colonial, Mid 19th Century Revival, Late Victorian
- NRHP reference No.: 93001242
- Added to NRHP: December 2, 1993

The Wallingford Center Historic District encompasses the historic 18th and 19th-century town Center of Wallingford, Connecticut. Extending mainly along North and South Main Streets, the district includes high-quality residential, civic, commercial, and institutional architecture from the mid-18th to early 20th centuries, reflecting the community's growth. The district was listed on the National Register of Historic Places in 1993.

== Description and history ==
Wallingford's historic town center is set atop a long North–South Ridge, along which Main Street runs. The historic district extends along Main Street from Ward Street in the South to Church Street in the North, and includes one block of commercial buildings on adjacent Center Street. The district has 73 buildings, of which 66 are of historic significance. Architecturally diverse houses, ranging from Georgian colonials to Queen Anne Victorians, line South Main Street North to Prince Street, where the town hall (1916 neo-Classical, formerly the town high school) begins the commercial and civic area. Three churches, built between 1868 and 1870, are prominent landmarks in that area, as is the former armory (1920, now the police station).

Wallingford was founded in the 1670s, but saw its major growth as a commercial and industrial center beginning in the mid-19th century, when local businessman began manufacturing silver products. The Simpson and Wallace families that dominated this business also built commercial blocks in the Downtown area that still stand. Wallingford's primary commercial center migrated westward to be nearer the railroad right-of-way in the early 20th century.

== See also ==
- National Register of Historic Places listings in New Haven County, Connecticut
