= John Knowles (antitrinitarian) =

John Knowles (fl. 1646–1668) was an English antitrinitarian preacher, imprisoned in 1665.

== Life ==
Probably a native of Gloucester, he first appears as a lay preacher among the Independents there; in 1648, he described himself as a preacher of the gospel, formerly in and near Gloucester. He was acquainted with the Greek text of the New Testament and with Latin commentators, and his antitrinitarian sentiments were the result of his own scriptural studies. He mentioned meeting John Biddle, who left Gloucester in 1646, but he did not adopt Biddle's specific opinions, his doctrine being of the Arian, not the Socinian type. He expressly stated in 1668 that he had not read any of the writings of F. P. Socinus.

By the parliamentary committee at Gloucester, he was examined (1646?) on suspicion of unsoundness in the article of the Trinity and gave a written statement in which he admitted to having ‘had some questionings,’ but gave his reasons for being now satisfied with ‘the Godhead of the Holy Ghost.’ He seems to have left Gloucester for London, where he lodged with Edward Atkinson, an antitrinitarian, in Aldersgate Street. Joining the parliamentary army, he belonged in 1648, according to his own account, to the lifeguard of Sir Thomas Fairfax. He still continued to preach, publishing a defence of ‘a private man's preaching.’ Early in 1650, he became public preacher to the garrison at Chester, in succession to Samuel Eaton. The biographer of John Murcot, writing in 1657, speaks of Knowles as having been ‘a formidable and blazing comet at Chester,’ where ‘in public sermons, private conferences, and by a manuscript’ he ‘denied Jesus Christ to be the Most High God.’

A short paper of arguments for the deity of Christ, sent by Eaton to Chester from Dukinfield, was published by Knowles in 1650, with his own reply. The pamphlet purports to have been ‘printed by T. N.’ for Gyles Calvert, the publisher of unorthodox theology, and in July 1650, John Whittell, girdler, of Milk Street, London, was brought before the council of state on the charge of having caused it to be printed. Replies were published by Eaton (1650 and 1651), and by Thomas Porter of Whitchurch, Shropshire (1651). The imprimatur of Porter's pamphlet, entitled ‘A Serious Exercitation,’ is dated 26 December 1650, and by that time Knowles was ‘late preacher at Chester.’ He appears to have returned to Gloucester, for on 19 November 1650, the mayor of that city was directed by the council of state to examine witnesses on oath respecting Knowles's preaching against the divinity of Christ. He moved to Pershore, Worcestershire, where he lived some fifteen years as ‘a professed minister.’

At Pershore, he was apprehended on 9 April 1665, by Thomas Windsor Hickman, 7th Baron Windsor, and imprisoned first at Worcester and then in the Gatehouse Prison, Westminster, on 23 May. Papers found in his house were made the basis of charges of heresy; he had been invited on 5 June 1662, by H. Hed of Huntingdon to meet Christopher Crell, the exiled Polish antitrinitarian, at Oxford; on 19 November 1664, he had been invited to London by Thomas Firmin. Letters from his friends were construed as implying that he was ready to countenance sedition. A collection on behalf of the Polish exiles was thought to be really for English rebels. On 23 June and again on 7 July he petitioned (writing also to George Monck, 1st Duke of Albemarle) for liberty to go out on bail, as the plague was then raging in London. His petition was repeated on 2 February 1666, and he gained his liberty soon afterwards. On his release, he mixed in controversial talk with the London clergy, who respected his learning and sincerity. With his publication in reply to Justification onely upon a Satisfaction (1668) by Robert Ferguson, he drops out of notice. A pamphleteer from 1698 states that he bequeathed books to a library in Gloucester.

== Works ==
He published:

- ‘A Modest Plea for Private Men's Preaching,’ &c., 1648, (published 30 March; in answer to ‘Private Men no Pulpit Men,’ &c., 1646, by Giles Workman).
- ‘A Friendly Debate … by Writing betwixt Mr. Samuel Eaton and Mr. John Knowles,’ &c., 1650.
- ‘An Answer to Mr. Ferguson's Book,’ &c. [1668?]. In this he mentions other projected publications, but he is not known to have issued anything further.
