= Joseph Blakeslee House =

Historic house in Connecticut, United States

- U.S. National Register of Historic Places
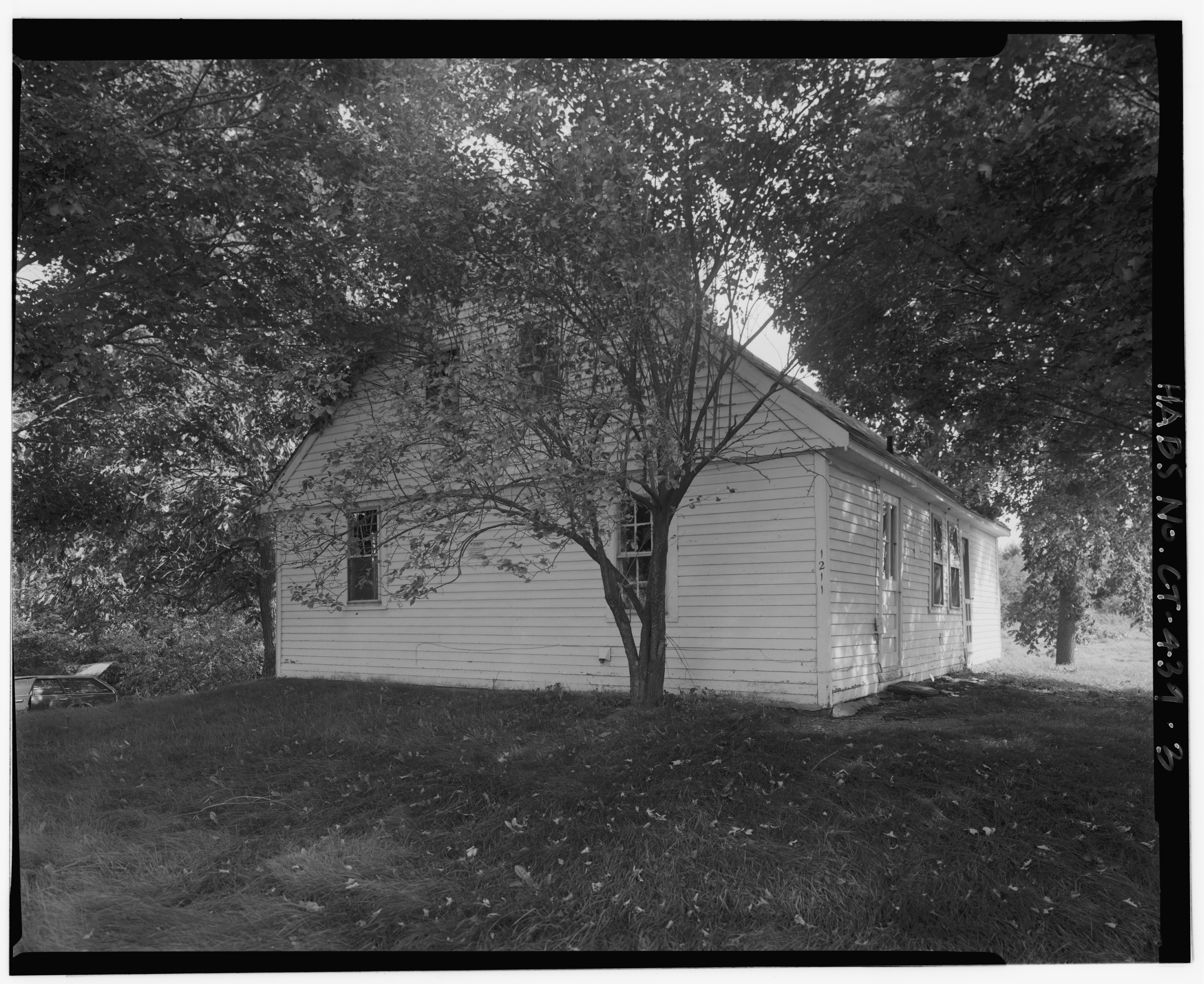
- HABS survey photo

- Location within Connecticut Location within the United States
- Location: 1211 Barnes Road, Wallingford, Connecticut
- Coordinates: 41°28′47″N 72°46′03″W
- Area: 2.4 acres (0.97 ha)
- Built by: Blakeslee, Joseph
- Architectural style: Colonial
- NRHP reference No.: 98000362
- Added to NRHP: April 13, 1998

The Joseph Blakeslee House was a historic house at 1211 Barnes Road Route 68 in Wallingford, Connecticut. Built in 1780, it was a good example of a late 18th-century Cape style residence. It was listed on the National Register of Historic Places in 1998. It collapsed and was demolished in 2008.

== Description and history ==
The Joseph Blakeslee House stood at the Northeast Corner of Barnes Road (Route 68) and Research Parkway in northeastern Wallingford. The parcel which it stood is nearly surrounded by commercial development. It was a 1 1/2-story wood-frame structure, with a gabled roof, central chimney, and clapboarded exterior. It was oriented facing east, with a low stone retaining wall in front. Its main facade was three bays wide, with a center entrance that was once topped by a four-light transom window. The trim at the building corners and around the window and door openings was simple. The interior followed a fairly typical period central chimney plan, although the place typically occupied by a staircase in the entrance vestibule contained a closet. The staircase to the attic was located in the rear of the house, between the kitchen and buttery.

The house was built in 1780 by Joseph Blakeslee, a veteran of the French and Indian War. He was forced to sell it soon afterward, apparently suffering economically from the ongoing American Revolutionary War. The property was bought back into the family by his son in 1793, who was a farmer of middling success. The farm remained in the Blakeslee family until 1900, when it was bought by the Barnes family. The bulk of the farm was sold for development in 1963, the house parcel remaining set off and eventually acquired by the local historical society. At the time of its National Register listing in 1998, it was in deteriorated condition, with its roof in imminent failure. It subsequently collapsed and was demolished in 2008.

== See also ==
- National Register of Historic Places listings in New Haven County, Connecticut
