= Thomas Yale (Wallingford) =

Captain and cofounder of Wallingford, Connecticut

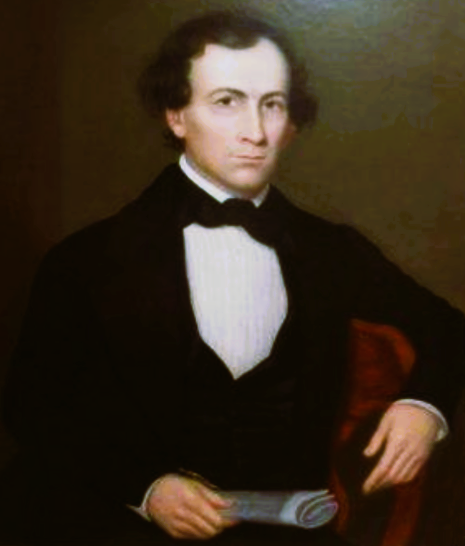
Portrait of Capt. Yale's descendant, postmaster Ira Newell Yale, great-grandson of his child, Nathaniel Yale

Captain Thomas Yale (c. 1647 – 1736) was a British-American magistrate, politician and military officer. He was one of the founders of the town of Wallingford, Connecticut. He became Justice of the Peace, surveyor and moderator for Wallingford, and helped establish its first Congregational church in 1675. He was also elected, for numbers of years, as deputy to the Connecticut General Assembly.

His father, Capt. Thomas Yale, was the cofounder of New Haven Colony, and the first Yale to emigrate to the Thirteen Colonies.

== Early life ==
Thomas Yale was born in New Haven Colony around 1647, to Mary Turner and Capt. Thomas Yale, members of the Yale family, and future namesake of Yale College. His father was one of the cofounders of New Haven Colony with his step-grandfather, Gov. Theophilus Eaton, the colony's first governor, and his step-grand uncle, minister Samuel Eaton.

His half-uncle, Samuel Eaton Jr., cofounded the Harvard Corporation in 1650, and his step-grand uncle, Nathaniel Eaton, had been Harvard's first president designate and builder before being dismissed in 1639. Yale's uncle was Gov. Edward Hopkins, 2nd governor of Connecticut, and his other uncle, William Jones, was one of its early deputy governors.

== Biography ==
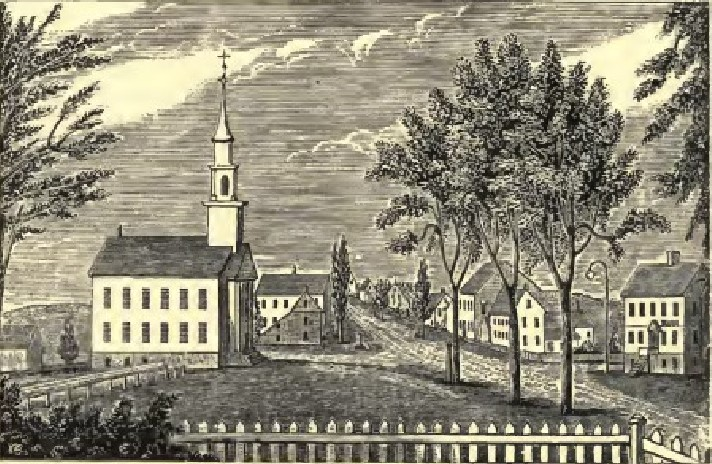
The town of Wallingford, Connecticut, cofounded by Capt. Yale and others during the 1668 Wallingford Agreement, Yale also cofounded its Congregational church on the left

While initially born in New Haven Colony, Yale removed afterwards to Wallingford, Connecticut, with his first wife, and became one of its cofounders, signing the 1668 Wallingford Agreement. He was under the direction of the New Haven Committee.

Yale became captain of the train-band, also known as the town's militia, and gained influence in the colony. He became deputy to the Connecticut General Assembly in 1684, 1687, 1688 and 1689. He was re-elected as deputy in 1690, 1692 and 1693, and once again from 1694 to 1697 and in 1702.

In 1673, at a town meeting, Yale was given charge, with Mr. Moss, Lt. Merriman and Benjamin Lewis, to establish a corn mill with builder Lt. Fowler. In 1675, Yale assisted in the creation of the first Congregational church in Wallingford, and helped find its first ministers. He also held number of offices for the town, such as Justice of the Peace, surveyor, and moderator at public meetings. He was also in charge of keeping the town records and their proceedings for about 20 years.

In 1692, Yale was given the command of the city's militia with Lt. Nath. Merriman, under Lt. Col. John Allyn, Secretary of Connecticut Colony. They were also given commissions by Gov. Robert Treat, the great-grandfather of Founding Father Robert Treat Paine. In 1697, Yale was attorney to Dr. John Hull in a lawsuit against Isaac Curtis. In 1698, Capt. Yale was appointed to lay out the grants awarded to Sgt. Merriman for his father's role in the Pequot War. In 1710, Yale was in charge with John Merriam and Thomas Hall, to sell Indian lands to Bartholomew Foster.

Yale died in Connecticut Colony on January 26, 1736, at 88 years of age. His son, Thomas Yale Jr., married the daughter of Joseph Benham, and cofounded the first Congregational Church at Meriden, Connecticut, with Rev. Theophilus Hall as its first pastor.

== Marriage ==
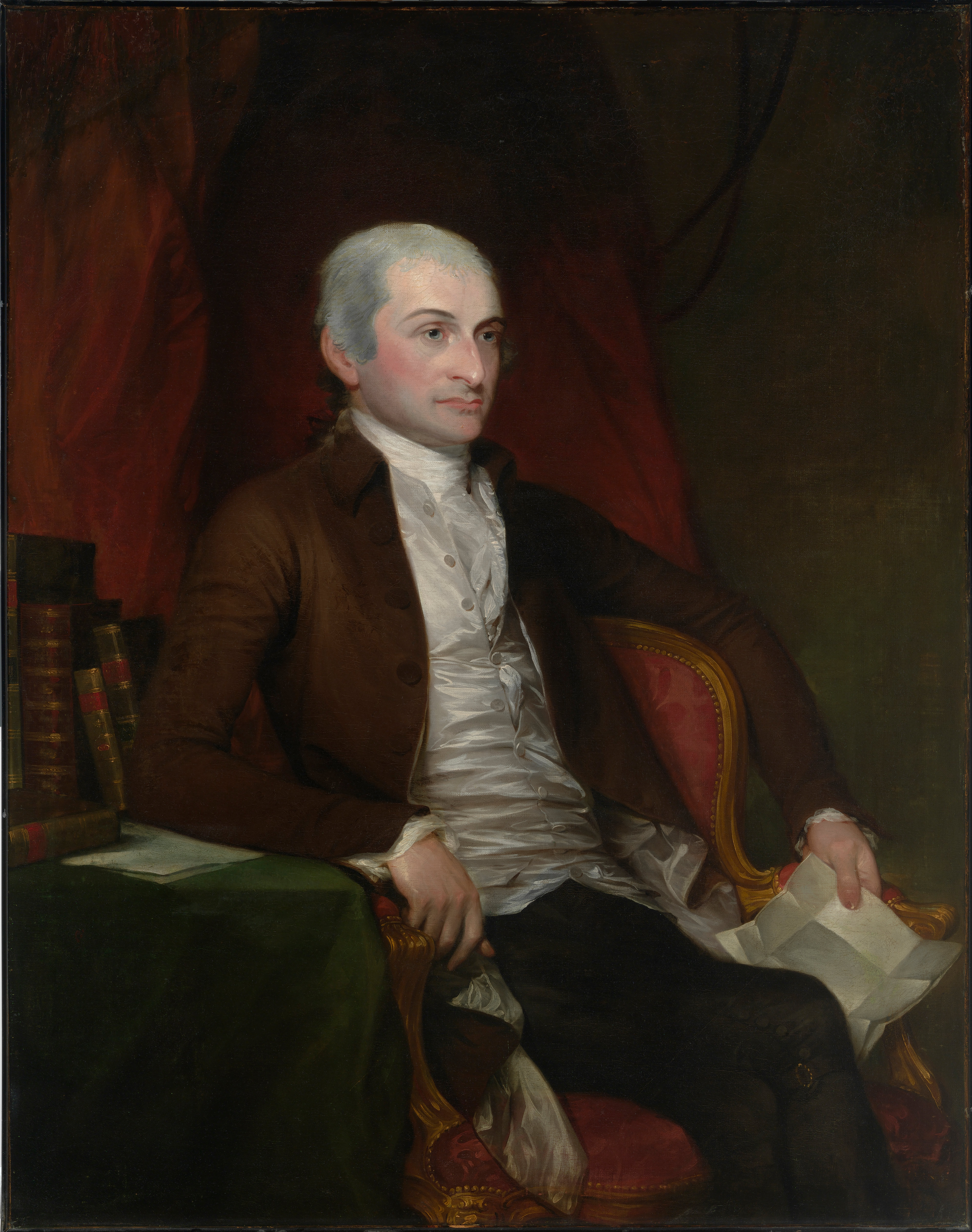
Founding Father John Jay, chief justice in charge of the supreme court case before Congress named United States vs Yale Todd

Yale married to Rebecca Gibbards, daughter of William Gibbards in 1667, by deputy governor William Jones, his uncle. He married secondly to Sarah Nash, daughter of John Nash, Esquire, and thirdly to Mary Beach of Wallingford. He had 8 children with his first wife, and no children with his second and third wives.

His son, Capt. Theophilus Yale, also became a magistrate in Wallingford, and his great-grandson, Capt. Elihu Yale, became one of the first manufacturers of bayonets in Connecticut. His son, Nathaniel Yale, married the daughter of John Peck, Esquire, brother of Rev. Jeremiah Peck, a minister in Saybrook and cofounder of Newark, New Jersey.

Nathaniel became the great-grandfather of postmaster Ira Newell Yale, a wealthy merchant from Meriden, Connecticut. Ira was also the grandson of Deacon Nathaniel Yale, and the granduncle of Col. Ira Yale Sage, a wealthy railroad constructor. Capt. Yale's grandson, merchant Samuel Yale, married Scottish Susanna Abernathy, stepdaughter of Sarah Doolittle, and daughter of Abraham Doolittle, Marshal and Deputy to the Connecticut Colony Court.

Her step-uncle, Dr. John Brockett, husband of Elizabeth Doolittle, was a graduate from Oxford University, son of colonist John Brockett, surgeon and Deputy to the General Court of New Haven Colony. One of her brothers, Deputy Joseph Doolittle, was made captain and lieutenant of the train-band by Gov. Gurdon Saltonstall. They were also members of the family of Sir John Brocket of Brocket Hall, and politician Dudley North, the son-in-law of Elihu Yale, benefactor of Yale College.

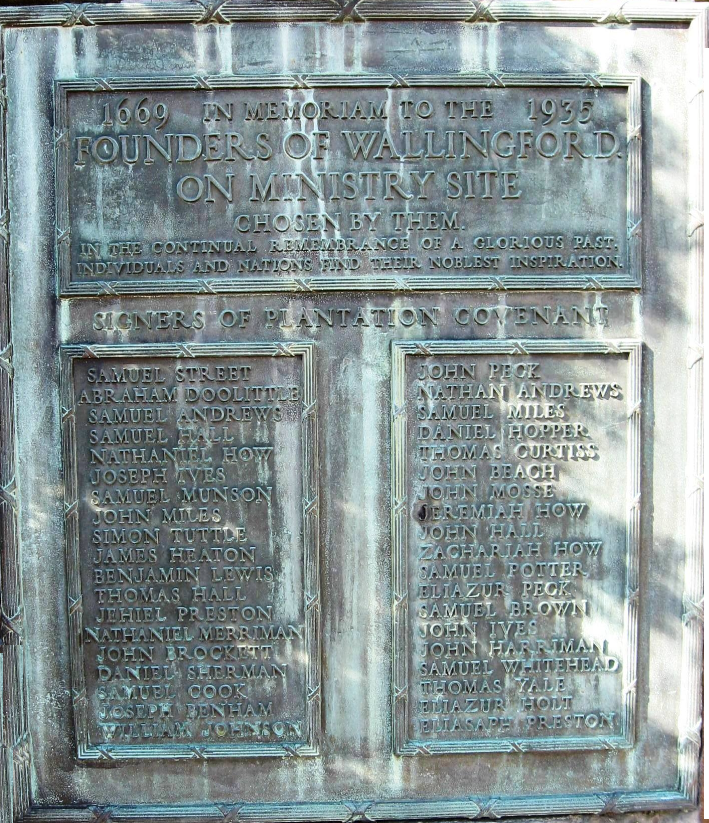
Memorial plate, Founders of Wallingford, Connecticut, Capt. Thomas Yale is at the end

=== Yale Todd ===
Another descendant, Yale Todd, a veteran of the American War of Independence, went in front of Congress under United States vs Yale Todd, regarding the constitutionality of the obtention of his military pension after being disabled by wounds, having served under Gen. David Wooster's regiment.

It was examined for the future case of John Adams and Thomas Jefferson, but was not used as a precedent, as the case was unofficial at the time. The case involved what is probably the first constitutional question presented to the Supreme Court of the United States.

The case was under Hon. Chief Justice and Founding Father John Jay, and Attorney General William Bradford. Yale Todd would be accorded his pension by John Jay, William Cushing, and Richard Law.

This case, with another, gave rise to Marbury v. Madison, a case originating from the rivalry between Presidents John Adams and Thomas Jefferson.
