= James Bishop (colonial administrator) =

American politician

Lieutenant Governor
- In office 1681–1683

23rd Deputy Governor Connecticut
- In office 1683–1691
- Preceded by: Robert Treat
- Succeeded by: William Jones

Personal details
- Born: 1625 Kingston, England, Kingdom of England
- Died: 24 January 1691 (aged 65–66) New Haven, Connecticut, England
- Resting place: New Haven, Connecticut, United States
- Spouse(s): Mary Lewen Elizabeth Tomkins (m. 1665)
- Children: Hannah, Grace, Sarah, Elizabeth, Abigail, John, Ruth, Samuel, Mary, James II, and Rebecca

Military service
- Allegiance: England
- Years of service: 1673-1676

James Bishop (1625 – January 24, 1691) was an early English colonial administrator of the Colony of Connecticut.

== Biography ==
Born in Kingston, Surrey, England, Bishop came to North America, arriving in Boston, Massachusetts in 1634 with his brothers Nathaniel and Henry. He was a young boy at that time and Henry was his guardian. While in Boston, they became acquainted with the Rev Davenport. In 1638, they were part of the original group of settlers who settled the colony of New Haven, Connecticut. Henry worked as a farmer to Rev Davenport. It is believed that Rev Davenport tutored James, as he appeared to be much better educated than most men of that time.

Bishop married Mary Lewen and they had seven children: Hannah, Grace, Sarah, Elizabeth, Abigail, John, and Ruth. On December 12, 1665, he married his second wife, Elizabeth Tomkins, and they had four children, Samuel, Mary, James II, and Rebecca (Bishop) Thompson.

== Career ==
Very interested in politics, Bishop became the secretary of New Haven Colony from 1651 to 1658. He was very involved in the early governments of New Haven and Connecticut colonies, serving at various times as deputy to the legislature. He was a Representative in 1665 and served seven terms until 1668. He was assistant judge from 1668 to 1683, and sergeant in the New Haven militia. Bishop served on the Committee on Indians in 1668 and later served on the wartime council from 1673–1676 that dealt with King Philip's War.

Finally, Bishop was Lieutenant Governor of Connecticut in 1681–1683 and Deputy Governor from 1683 until his death.

== Death ==
Bishop died in 1691. He is buried at Grove Street Cemetery in New Haven, Connecticut.
