= Christopher Davenport =

English Catholic theologian, Recollect friar and royal chaplain

Francis Davenport, O.M.R., also known as Francis of Saint Clare, (1598 – 31 May 1680) was an English Catholic theologian, a Recollect friar and royal chaplain.

== Life ==
He was born Christopher Davenport in Coventry, England, in 1598, the son of Alderman John Davenport and Elizabeth Wolley, and from the grammar school at Coventry went to Trinity College Dublin where he spent fifteen months, leaving it 22 November 1611. In 1613 he and his brother John Davenport proceeded to Merton College, Oxford, entering as "battelers" and taking Cook's commons; but the warden required them to enter as commoners or to leave the college; whereon in 1614 they transferred to Magdalen Hall. Here Christopher received his Bachelor of Arts degree on 28 May, his Dublin residence being allowed to count. His brother John subsequently became a noted Puritan minister and joined the Massachusetts Bay Colony in New England. Leading a band of some 500 colonists from there, he founded the New Haven Colony in 1638, later a part of the Connecticut Colony.

Christopher Davenport, on the other hand, was converted to Catholicism by a priest living near Oxford and in 1615 went to the English College, Douai, Flanders (present day northeast France). Attracted by the efforts to restore the English Franciscan Province, he joined the Flemish Franciscans at Ypres, 7 October 1617. When he was professed the following year, under the name of Francis of St. Clare, he joined the English Franciscan Recollects, a reform branch of the Order of Friars Minor known for their strict practice of poverty, at the newly established friary of St. Bonaventure in Douai on 18 October 1618.

Davenport was sent to the University of Salamanca in Spain, where he earned his Doctorate of Divinity. Returning to Douai, he became first professor of theology at St. Bonaventure's and filled the office of guardian. At length he was sent to England and was appointed chaplain to Queen Henrietta Maria, in which capacity he attended the Court and became acquainted with King Charles I of England, Archbishop Laud, Richard Montague, Lord Bishop of Norwich, and Godfrey Goodman, Lord Bishop of Gloucester.

On 19 June 1637, Davenport was elected Minister Provincial of the Recollects, an office to which he was subsequently re-elected on 10 July 1650, and 4 June 1665. After the Restoration of 1660 he was appointed chaplain to Queen Catharine of Braganza, and returned to London, where he spent most of his remaining years with occasional visits to Flanders. His intellectual ability and attractive manner won him the friendship of many, and aided in reconciling numerous converts to the Catholic Church, among whom was Anne, Duchess of York.

He died on 31 May 1680.

== Works ==
Inspired with the idea of converting England by means of corporate reunion, Davenport wrote a treatise to show that the Thirty-nine Articles were susceptible of an interpretation more in accordance with Catholic teaching than was usually supposed. This was the Paraphrastica Expositio Articulorum Confessionis Anglicanae, published as an appendix to his book, Deus, Natura, Gratia (Lyon, 1634). It offended many Catholics and was put on the Index in Spain, though a condemnation by Rome was averted by Gregorio Panzani, the pope's unofficial representative in London. In this work he also was one of the Catholic writers who seized on the 1633 thesis of Eleazar Duncon, printed in the Five Pious and Learned Discourses (1635) of Robert Shelford, as illustrating how close Anglican and Catholic theological views had become. In 1652, while serving as Provincial of his Order for England, Davenport published his most ambitious philosophical treatise, Paralipomena philosophica de mundo peripatetico, aimed at harmonizing Scotism with new astronomical and chemical discoveries.

Davenport's other works are:

- Epistolium, continens confutationem duarum proposititionem astrologicarum (Douai, 1626);
- Apologia Episcoporum (Cologne, 1640);
- The Practice of the Presence of God (Douai, 1642);
- Systema Fidei (Liège, 1648);
- De Definibilitate Controversiae Immaculate Conceptionis Dei Genitricis Opusculum (Douai, 1651);
- Explanation of the Mundo Peripatetico (Antwerp, 1652);
- An Echiridion of Faith (Douai, 1655);
- Explanation of the Catholic Belief (1656);
- Manuale Missionariorum Regularium praecipue Anglorum Ordinis Sacti Francisci (Douai, 1658, 1661);
- Fragmenta seu Historia minor Provinciae Angliae FF. Minorum (2nd edition, Douai, 1661); 2nd edition online;
- Tractatus de Schismate praesertim Anglicano;
- Vindication of Roman Catholics (1659);
- Liber Dialogorum (Douai, 1661);
- Problemata Scholastica et controversialia speculativa;
- Corollarium Dialogi de Medio Aninarum Statu,
- Religio Philosophia Peripati discutienda (Douai, 1662, 1667);
- Opera omnia Francisci a S. Clara (Douai, 1665-1667);
- Disputatio de antiqua Provinciae Praecedentia (1670);
- Supplementum Historiae Provinciae Angliae (Douai, 1671).
