= Samuel Eaton =

English independent divine

Samuel Eaton (1596?–1665) was an English Independent divine. He was a graduate from Magdalene College, Cambridge, and emigrated to the Thirteen British Colonies as a minister, following disagreements with Archbishop Laud. He was also a colleague of Puritan John Davenport, co-founder of New Haven Colony.

== Life ==
=== Early life and travel ===
Eaton was the third son of Richard Eaton, vicar of Great Budworth, Cheshire, and was born in the hamlet of Crowley in Great Budworth. He was educated at Magdalene College, Cambridge, where he graduated B.A. 1624 and M.A. 1628.

Eaton took orders and was beneficed, but being unable to conform to the regulations of the church as interpreted by Archbishop Laud, he accompanied his eldest brother Theophilus Eaton to New England in 1637, and became the colleague of John Davenport at New Haven. A difference of opinion afterwards arose between him and Davenport. At the convention of 4 June 1639 (O. S.) Eaton took exception to the fifth article of the constitution, which limited the right of voting and of holding public office to church members only on the ground that "the free planters ought not to surrender this power out of their hands". After his brother and Davenport had replied, he found so little support that he withdrew his dissent.

=== Career in England ===
In 1640 he returned to England. He planned to gather a company to settle Toboket, afterwards Branford, of which a grant had been made to him. On his way he preached for some time in Boston, but declined an invitation to settle there permanently. He arrived in England at a time when his own party was everywhere triumphant, and he found more encouragement to remain there than to return to the 'wilderness'. He stayed in England for the rest of his life.

He soon showed himself a vigorous asserter of Independency. Annexed to the Royalist Sir Thomas Aston's Remonstrance against Presbytery, 4to, 1641, are "Certain Positions preached at St. John's Church in Chester, by Mr. Samuel Eaton, a minister lately returned from New England, upon Sunday, being the third day of January 1640", as well as "Certyn other Positions preached by the same man at Knuttesford, a great Market Toune in the same County". Aston bears unwilling testimony to Eaton's powers as a preacher in asserting that by his "doctrines many of the common people are brought into that odium of the Book of Common Prayer, that divers of them will not come into the church during the time of divine service". In August 1641 "the New England Mr. Eaton" is reported as having delivered at Barrow, Cheshire, a violent tirade "against the bishops and their government".

Eaton became an assistant to the parliamentary commissioners of Cheshire. He was afterwards chosen teacher of a congregational church at Dukinfield in Cheshire, whence he removed to the neighbouring borough of Stockport, where he preached in the free school. In this place he had difficulty with his people, some of whom, says Edmund Calamy, "ran things to a great height, and grew wiser than their minister". Upon being silenced in 1662 he attended the ministry of John Angier at Denton, near Manchester, where, it is said, many of his old hearers who had disliked him much while he was their minister "were wrought into a better temper".

=== Disagreements with Quakers ===
Eaton became involved in the case of a member of his congregation who had married a Quaker and joined that denomination; this led to a debate on the merits of the two denominations which was eventually answered by the founder of the Quakers, George Fox.

== Death ==
He died at Denton 9 Jan. 1664–5, aged 68, and was buried in the chapel there on the 13th. He left no children. In his funeral sermon he is stated to have suffered not only from the persecution which raged against the silenced ministers, being "several times brought into trouble and imprisoned", but from grievous bodily affliction; he had "been dying many years".

== Works ==
Eaton and his Dukinfield colleague Timothy Taylor entered into sustained controversy with Richard Hollinworth, and Eaton later attacked the theology of both the antitrinitarian John Knowles and the Quakers. Eaton's writings were favourably regarded by the council of state, who, convinced of his "merit and good affection", augmented his stipend on two occasions (ib. 1651, p. 213, 1654, p. 293).

- (with Timothy Taylor) A Defence of sundry Positions and Scriptures alledged to justifie the Congregationall-way; charged at first to be weak … and unsufficient, by R[ichard] H[ollingworth] M.A., of Magd. Coll. Cambr. in his examination of them; but upon further examination, clearly manifested to be sufficient, etc., 4to, London, 1645. Hollingworth published An Epistle in reply the following year.
- (with Timothy Taylor) The Defence of sundry Positions and Scriptures for the Congregational-way justified, etc., 4to, London, 1646. This was again aimed at Hollingworth, who replied with A Rejoynder in 1647.
- The Oath of Allegiance and the National Covenant proved to be non-obliging: or, Three several Papers on that subject; viz. (1.) Two Positions … (2.) An Anwer [sic] to the said Positions. (3.) A Reply to the said Answer, etc., 4to, London [1 July], 1650, in refutation of a pamphlet which had appeared in the previous February entitled A Vindication of the Oath of Allegiance by 'the Author of the Exercitation concerning Usurped Powers.'
- A Friendly Debate on a weighty subject; or, a Conference by writing betwixt Mr. Samuel Eaton and Mr. John Knowles concerning the Divinity of Jesus Christ: for the beating out and further clearing up of truth, 4to, London, 1650. For printing and publishing this tract John Whittell, girdler, of Milk Street, London, had to appear before the council of state in July of that year. Thomas Porter, 'minister at Whitchurch,’ replied the following year in 'A Serious Exercitation.'
- Paper concerning the Godhead of Christ, 8vo, London, 1650, written to rebut the Socinian arguments of John Knowles. A more elaborate reply was
- The Mystery of God Incarnate; or the Word made Flesh cleered up: or, A Vindication of certain Scriptures … from the corrupt Glosses, false Interpretations, and sophisticall Argumentations of M. John Knowles, who denies the Divinity of Christ. Also, Certain Annotations and Observations upon a Pamphlet entituled A Confession of Faith concerning the Holy Trinity, etc., whereunto is annexed the attestation of Philip Nye [and others], 12mo, London, 1650.
- Vindication, or further Confirmation of some other Scriptures, produced to prove the Divinity of Jesus Christ, distorted and miserably wrested and abused by M. John Knowles, with a discourse, 8vo, London, 1651.
- The Quakers Confuted; being an Answer unto nineteen Queries propounded by them, and sent to the Elders of the Church of Duckinfield in Cheshire. … Together with an Answer to a Letter which was written … by one of them (R. Waller) [with the Letter], 4to, London, 1654. This venomous attack was answered anonymously during the same year, and was glanced at by George Fox in his Great Mystery, 1659, and Journal.
