= Wallingford, Connecticut =

Wallingford
- Town
- Town of Wallingford
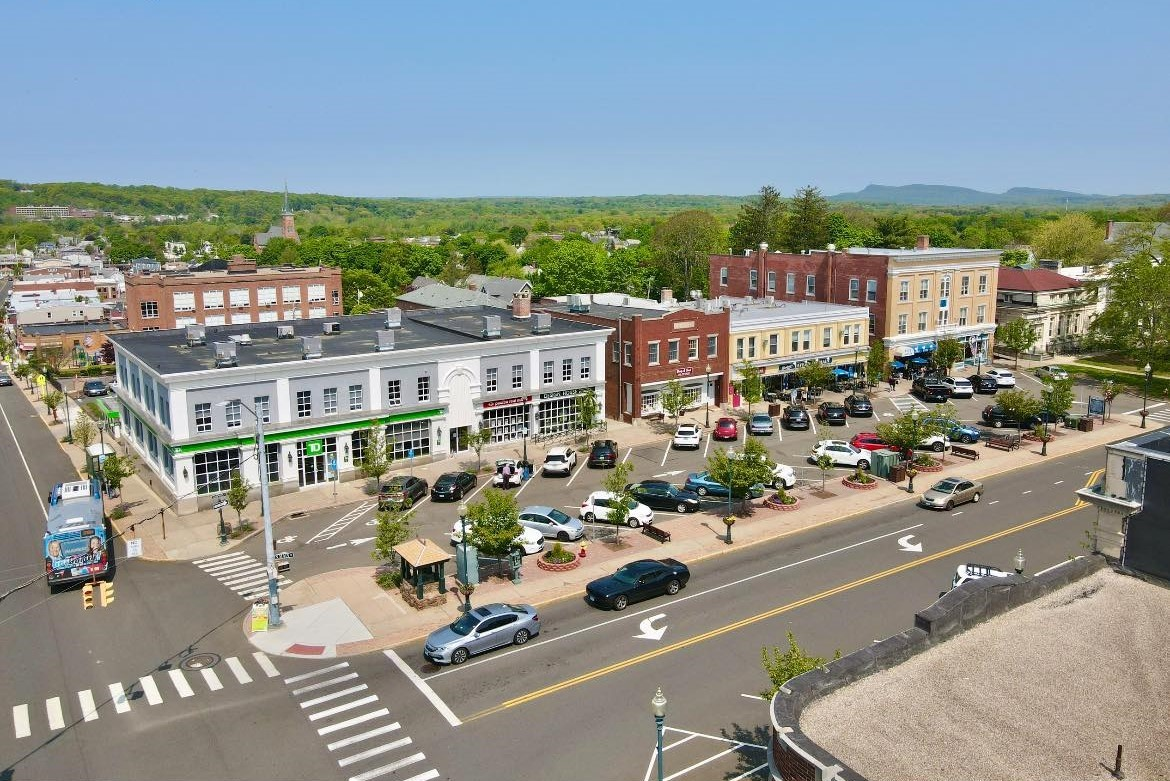
- Downtown Wallingford

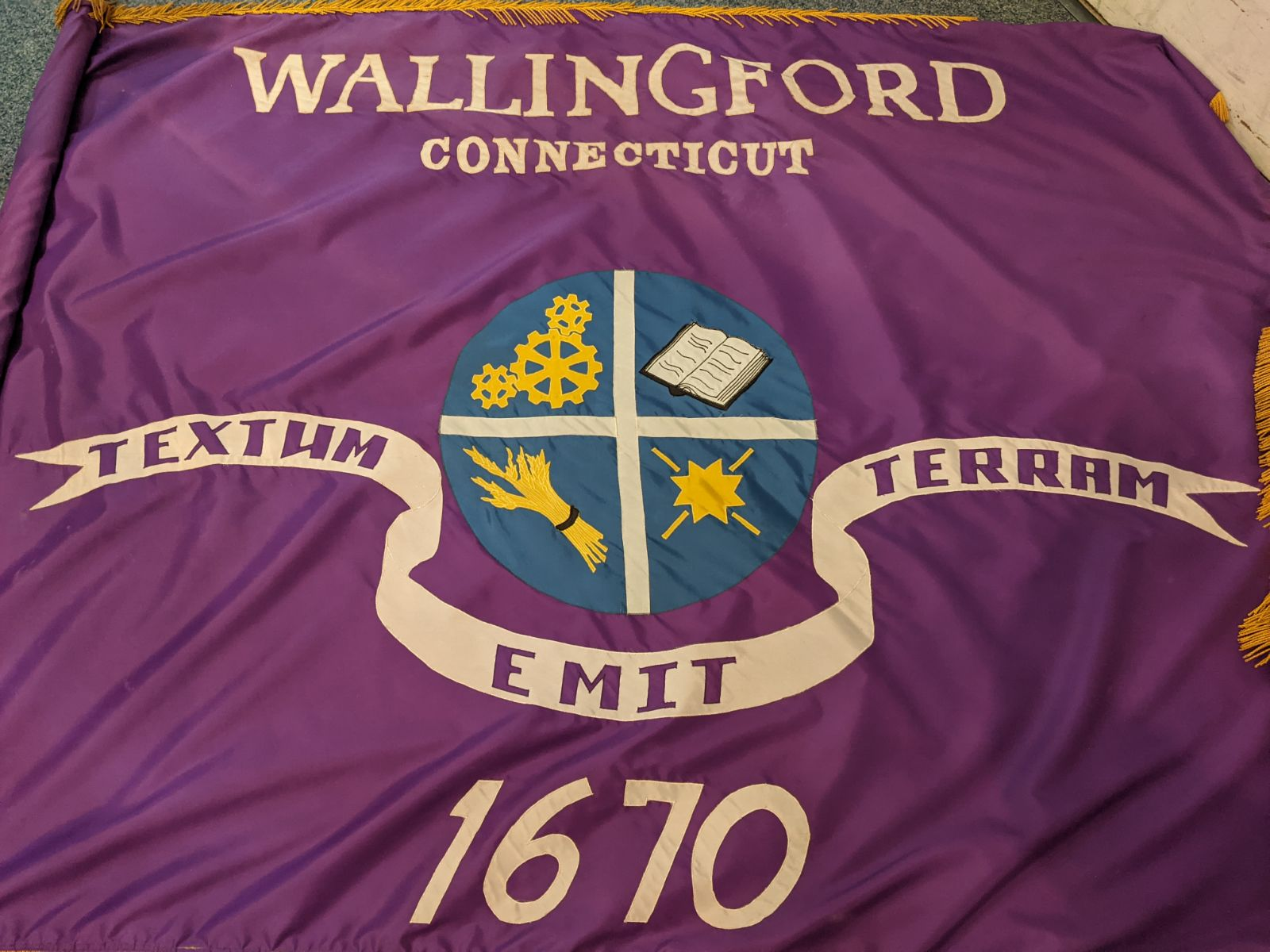
- Flag Seal
- Motto: "A Great New England Town"
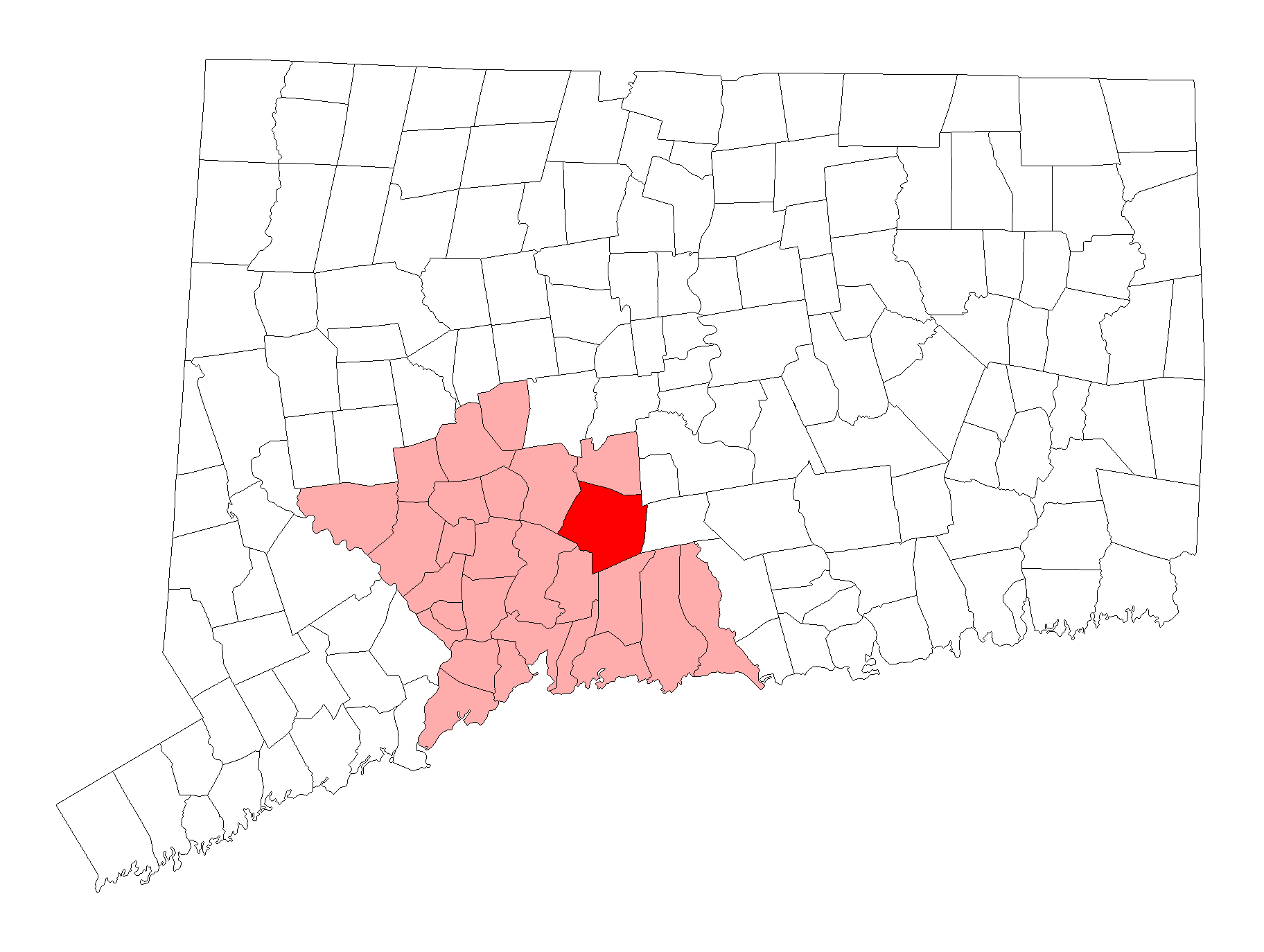
- Coordinates: 41°27′23″N 72°48′15″W
- Country: United States
- U.S. state: Connecticut
- County: New Haven
- Region: South Central CT
- MSA: Greater New Haven
- CSA: New York
- Established: 1670

Government
  - Type: Mayor-council
  - Mayor: Vincent Cervoni (R)
  - Town Council: Vincent F. Testa, Jr. (D), Chair; Sam Carmody (D), Vice Chair; Jesse Reynolds (D); Bryan Rivard (D); Melanie Rossacci (D); Craig C. Fishbein (R); Thomas Laffin (R); Autumn Allinson (R); Christina Tatta (R)

Area
  - Total: 39.9 sq mi (103.3 km^{2})
  - Land: 39.0 sq mi (101.1 km^{2})
  - Water: 0.85 sq mi (2.2 km^{2})
- Elevation: 151 ft (46 m)

Population (2020)
  - Total: 44,396
  - Density: 1,137/sq mi (439.1/km^{2})
- Time zone: UTC−5 (Eastern)
  - Summer (DST): UTC−4 (Eastern)
- ZIP Codes: 06492, 06493
- Area codes: 203/475
- FIPS code: 09-78740
- GNIS feature ID: 0213522
- Website: wallingfordct.gov

Wallingford is a town in New Haven County, Connecticut, United States, centrally located between New Haven and Hartford, and Boston and New York City. The town is part of the South Central Connecticut Planning Region and the New York metropolitan area. The population was 44,396 at the 2020 census. The community was named after Wallingford, in England.

== History ==
Established on October 10, 1667 by the Connecticut General Assembly, Wallingford was founded by a group of 38 planters and freemen. These early settlers chose a strategic location near the Quinnipiac River, which is now the area known as Main Street. By May 12, 1670, the settlement had grown to include 126 residents living in temporary housing, and by 1675, 40 permanent homes had been constructed.

One of Wallingford's early settlers was Thomas Yale, an influential figure in the New Haven Colony and an ancestor of Elihu Yale, the benefactor after whom Yale University is named. Thomas Yale was a signatory of the Wallingford plantation covenant in 1667, marking the formal establishment of the town.

In 1697, the town became the site of Connecticut's last witchcraft trial when Winifred Benham and her teenage daughter were accused of witchcraft.

Born in Wallingford in 1724, Lyman Hall went on to become a prominent physician and statesman. Although he was born in Connecticut, he represented Georgia in the Continental Congress. Hall was one of the signers of the Declaration of Independence. A county in Georgia was named after him.

As Wallingford entered the 19th century, it began to transform from an agricultural community into an industrial hub. The arrival of the railroad in the 1840s, specifically the New Haven and Hartford Railroad (later part of the New York, New Haven, and Hartford Railroad), further accelerated the town's growth.

Wallingford became particularly renowned for its silver production, with companies like Hall, Elton & Co., Simpson, Hall, Miller & Co., and R. Wallace & Sons gaining national prominence. One of the key figures in this industry was Samuel Simpson, a local industrialist and philanthropist who played a pivotal role in Wallingford's rise as a center of silver manufacturing. Simpson, Hall, Miller & Co., which he co-founded, became one of the leading producers of silverware in the country. Samuel Simpson's contributions were instrumental in establishing Wallingford as a major hub for silver production. His company eventually became part of the International Silver Company, headquartered in the neighboring city of Meriden.

In the 19th century, Wallingford was also the birthplace of Moses Yale Beach, a prominent figure in American journalism. Born in 1800, Beach became the owner of the New York Sun and was known for pioneering the "penny press," making newspapers affordable to the general public. He is also credited for being a leading founder of the Associated Press.

However, Wallingford was not immune to tragedy. On August 9, 1878, a devastating tornado struck the town, leaving a path of destruction and claiming the lives of at least 34 and injuring 70 or more residents. This tornado remains the deadliest in Connecticut's history.

The post-World War II era saw significant growth in Wallingford's population, driven by the suburban boom that reshaped much of America. Despite the suburbanization, Wallingford continued to attract businesses, maintaining a robust economic base. The town became a hub for various industries, including medical, healthcare, high-tech specialty manufacturing, and research and development. The development of several industrial parks including Barnes Industrial Park, Casimir Pulaski Industrial Park, Centract Park, and MedWay Industrial Park—helped attract a wide range of businesses, further diversifying Wallingford's tax base. The establishment of an Interchange Zone at the intersection of Interstate 91 and Route 68 facilitated the growth of office parks, research centers, and hotels, cementing Wallingford's role as a key economic center in the region.

One of the most significant industrial presences in Wallingford during the late 20th and early 21st centuries was the Bristol-Myers Squibb Company. The pharmaceutical giant established a research and development facility in Wallingford's MedWay Industrial Park, becoming the town's largest taxpayer and a key contributor to its economy. However, in 2017, Bristol-Myers Squibb relocated its operations, and the facility was subsequently demolished in 2018.

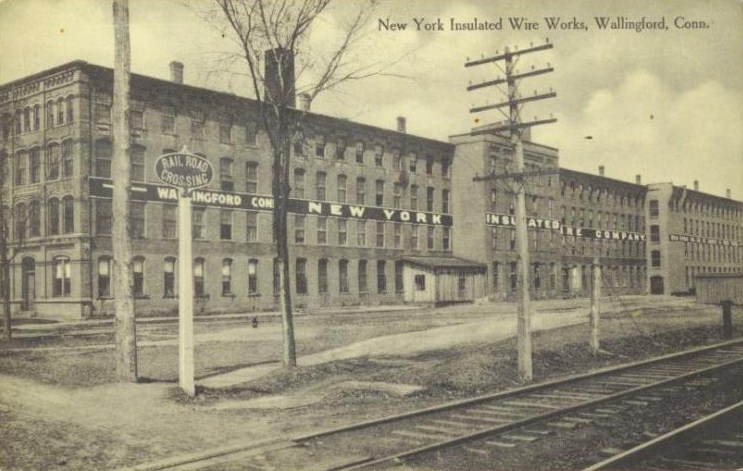
New York Insulated Wire Company, 1910

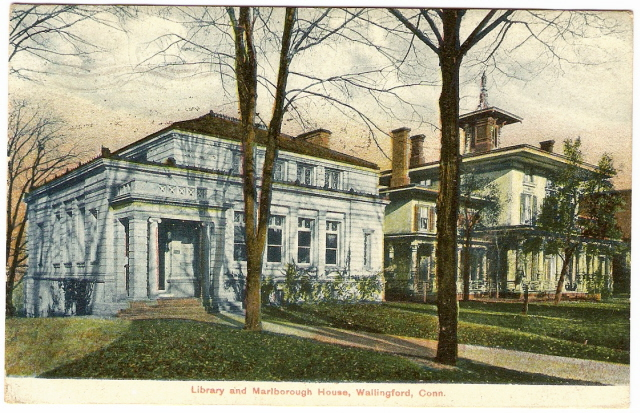
Library and Marlborough House, c. 1909

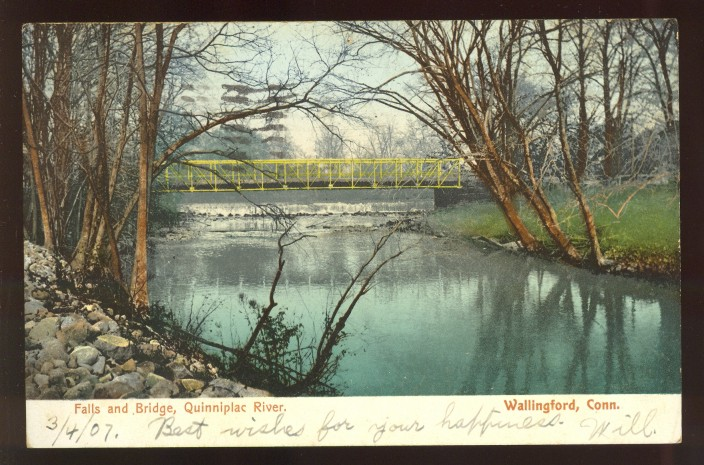
Bridge and falls at Quinnipiac River in Wallingford, 1907

== Education ==
Wallingford is served by the Wallingford Public School District, which includes several elementary schools, two middle schools (Dag Hammarskjold and James H. Moran), and two high schools (Mark T. Sheehan and Lyman Hall). The district offers a range of academic programs, including Advanced Placement courses, STEM education, and arts programs. Lyman Hall High School features a specialized agricultural science program. The district also provides special education services, English language learning programs, and a variety of sports programs, including football, soccer, basketball, and track and field.

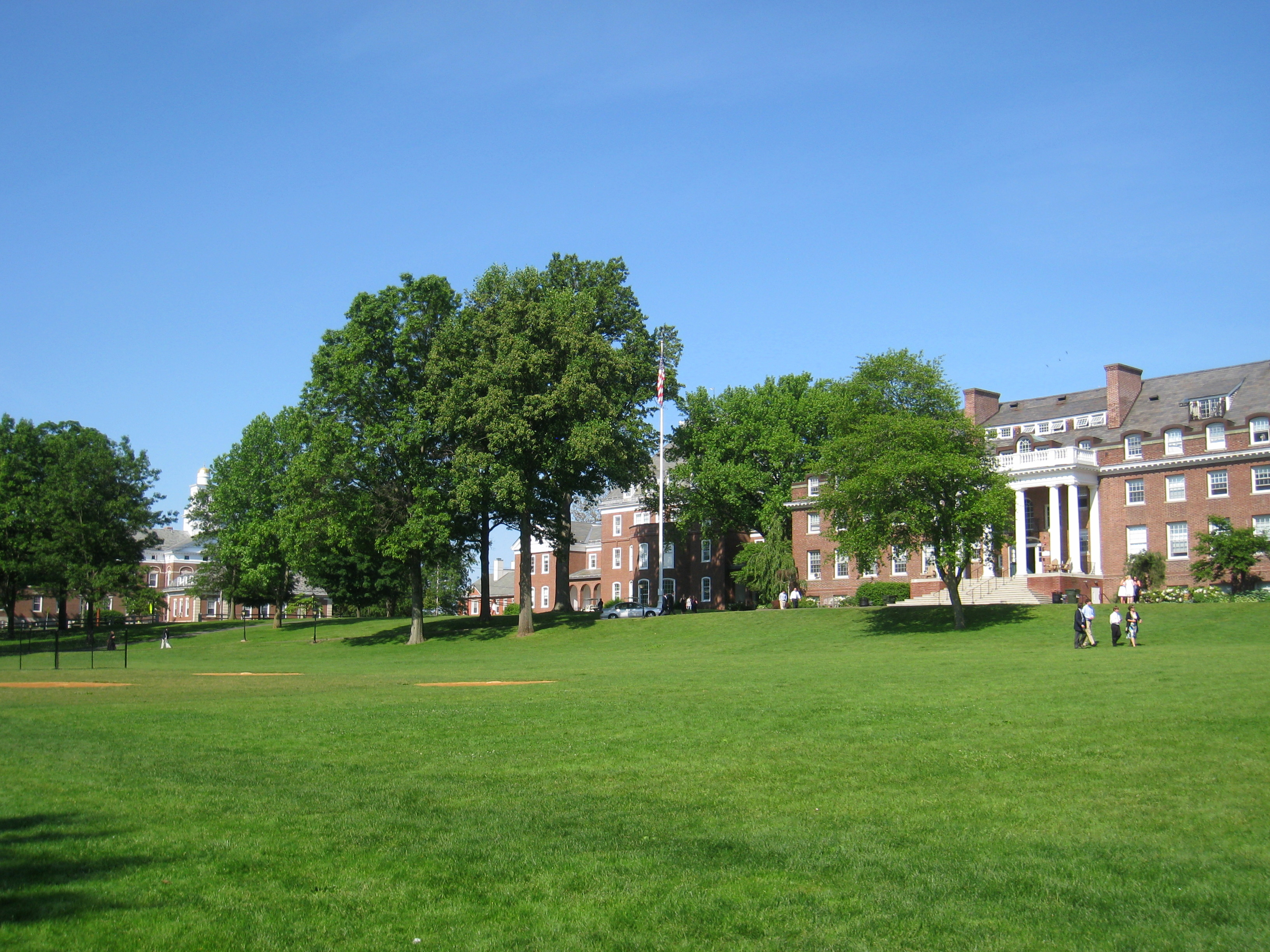
Choate Rosemary Hall Campus

=== Private schools ===
Wallingford is also home to three private schools:

- Choate Rosemary Hall, a private, co-educational, college-preparatory boarding school
- Heritage Baptist Academy
- Holy Trinity School

== Geography ==
According to the United States Census Bureau, the town has a total area of 39.9 square miles (103.3 km^{2}), of which 39.0 square miles (101.1 km^{2}) is land and 0.9 square miles (2.2 km^{2}), or 2.16%, is water.

The town of Wallingford sits astride the Quinnipiac River in northern New Haven County, roughly 90 miles northeast of New York City. It is 5 miles (8 km) south of Meriden and about 13 miles (21 km) north of New Haven. Towns bordering Wallingford are Cheshire, Durham, Hamden, Meriden, Middlefield, North Branford and North Haven. Situated in the Hartford-New Haven-Springfield corridor, Wallingford is traversed by U.S. Route 5, Interstate 91, and State Highways Route 15 (Wilbur Cross Parkway), Route 68, Route 71 and Route 150.

=== Principal communities ===
- East Wallingford
- Quinnipiac (partly in North Haven)
- Tracy
- Wallingford Center
- Yalesville

== Demographics ==
Historical population
Census	Pop.	Note	%±
1820	2,237		—
1850	2,595		—
1860	3,206		23.5%
1870	3,676		14.7%
1880	4,686		27.5%
1890	6,584		40.5%
1900	9,001		36.7%
1910	11,155		23.9%
1920	12,010		7.7%
1930	14,278		18.9%
1940	14,788		3.6%
1950	16,976		14.8%
1960	29,920		76.2%
1970	35,714		19.4%
1980	37,274		4.4%
1990	40,822		9.5%
2000	43,026		5.4%
2010	45,135		4.9%
2020	44,396		−1.6%
U.S. Decennial Census

As of 2022, Wallingford is home to approximately 44,446 residents. The racial makeup leans white (80.2%), with a notable Hispanic presence (11.6%) and smaller proportions of Asian (4.4%) and other groups. The median age sits at 44.3, indicating a blend of families and young professionals. Family households comprise 63% of the total, with 24% having children under their roof.

Wallingford's 2024 median household income was $104,773, and the median family income was $126,165. The average household and family income was $128,544 and $153,168 respectively. Compared to the national average, Wallingford's median income is significantly higher, putting it in the top 10% of U.S. households.

== Economy ==
=== Top employers ===
Top employers in Wallingford according to the town's 2022 Comprehensive Annual Financial Report:

#	Employer	# of Employees
1	Town of Wallingford	1,478
2	Anthem BC/BS	1,225
3	Gaylord Hospital	529
4	Community Health Network of CT	438
5	Masonic Healthcare Center	417
6	Choate Rosemary Hall	299
7	Ulbrich Stainless Steels & Special Metals, Inc.	215
8	BYK	197
9	Thurston Foods Inc	169
10	Fosdick Fulfillment Corp	157

== Transportation ==
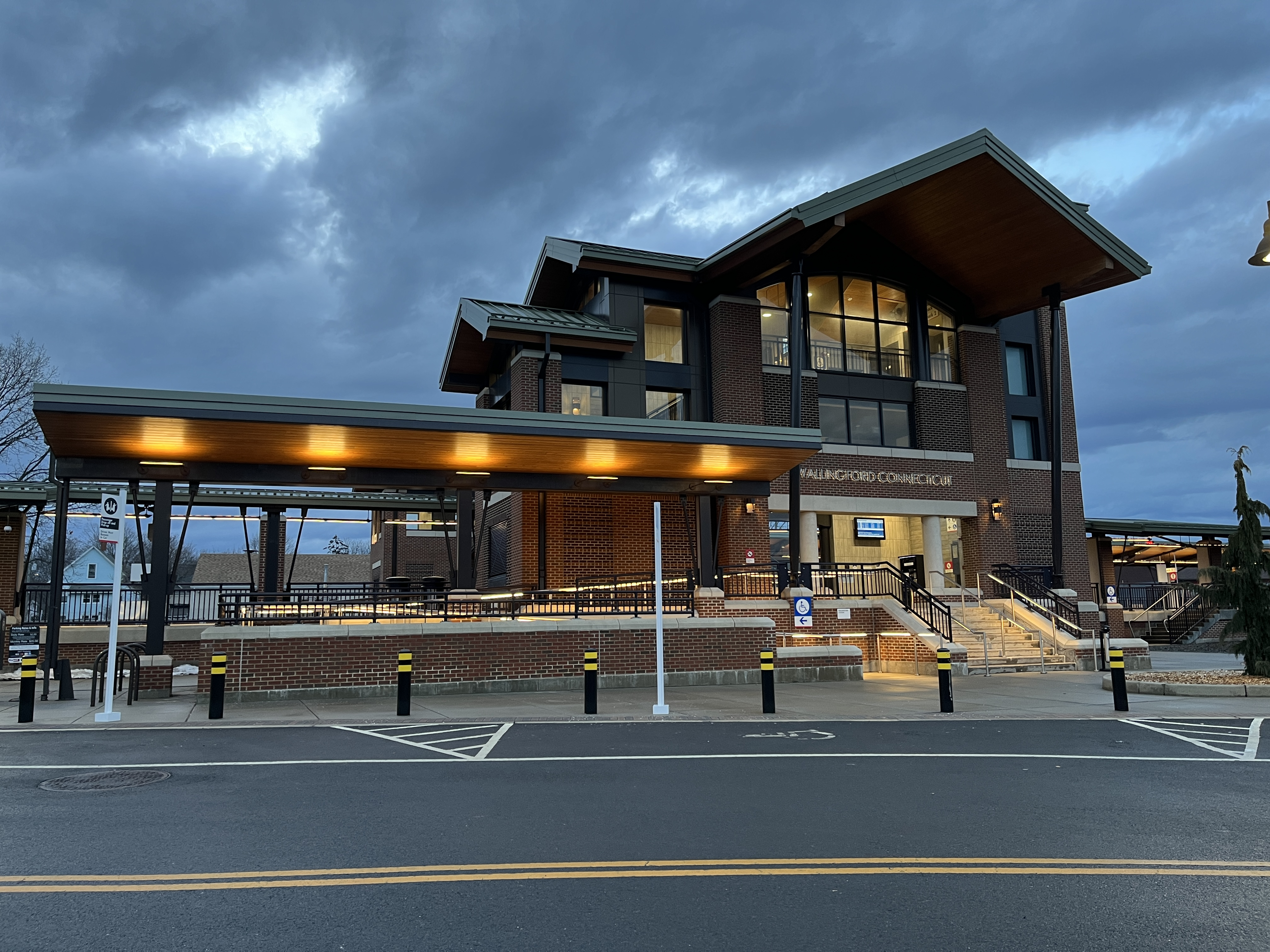
Wallingford train station is served by the Hartford Line and Amtrak

=== Mass transit ===
Wallingford is also located on the New Haven–Springfield Line, with daily passenger service to points north and south, providing direct access to New York City along with Boston via a connection in New Haven. It is served at Wallingford station by the CT Rail (Connecticut Department of Transportation) Hartford Line trains and by Amtrak's Hartford Line, Northeast Regional, and Valley Flyer.

=== Airports ===
Tweed New Haven Airport (HVN) in East Haven, Westchester County Airport in Westchester County, and Bradley International Airport (BDL) in Windsor Locks are the closest commercial airports to Wallingford.

== Municipal electric utility ==
The Wallingford Electric Division (WED) is a municipally owned utility that provides electricity to the town. Established in 1899, WED is one of Connecticut's few municipal electric utilities, operating under the town's governance. The Wallingford Electric Division is overseen by the Public Utilities Commission of Wallingford, which manages its operations, finances, and strategic planning.

== Sports ==
In 1943 and 1944 the Boston Braves held spring training in Wallingford at Choate's Winter Exercise Building. The town is the home of the Connecticut Bearcats, a New England Football League team.

== Notable people ==
- Erich Auerbach, German philologist
- Moses Yale Beach, American inventor, entrepreneur, philanthropist and publisher, who started the Associated Press, and is credited with originating print syndication
- William Yale Beach, early banker of Wallingford, real estate developer in the city, son of Moses Yale Beach
- Stephen R. Bradley, United States Senator
- Michael Buckley, YouTuber
- Mary Atwater Choate, cofounded Choate Rosemary Hall
- William Gardner Choate, American judge, cofounded Choate Rosemary Hall
- Bates Cooke, US Congressman
- D.J. Cotrona, actor
- Pasquale DeBaise (1926–2022), businessman and Connecticut state legislator
- Beverly Donofrio, author
- Morton Downey, singer, businessman
- Morton Downey, Jr. (1932–2001), talk show host
- Lauren Geremia, interior designer
- Robert Gober, influential contemporary artist
- Lyman Hall, an American Founding Father, physician, clergyman, statesman, and Declaration of Independence signatory
- Dorothy Kosinski, art scholar
- Raoul Lufbery, World War I flying ace
- John A. McGuire, member of the United States House of Representatives
- Art Nugent, cartoonist, creator of Uncle Art's Funland
- Jay Allen Sanford, author and cartoonist
- Samuel Simpson, silversmith industrialist and entrepreneur
- Hilton Valentine (1943–2021), musician associated with The Animals, moved to Wallingford in 1977
- Theophilus Yale, captain, magistrate and early settler of Wallingford
- Elihu Yale, captain, pioneer bayonet manufacturer in Connecticut
- Charles Dwight Yale, Connecticut State Senator, businessman, co-proprietor of Simpson, Hall, Miller & Co.
- Thomas Yale, one of the cofounders of Wallingford, son of Capt. Thomas Yale

== Points of interest ==
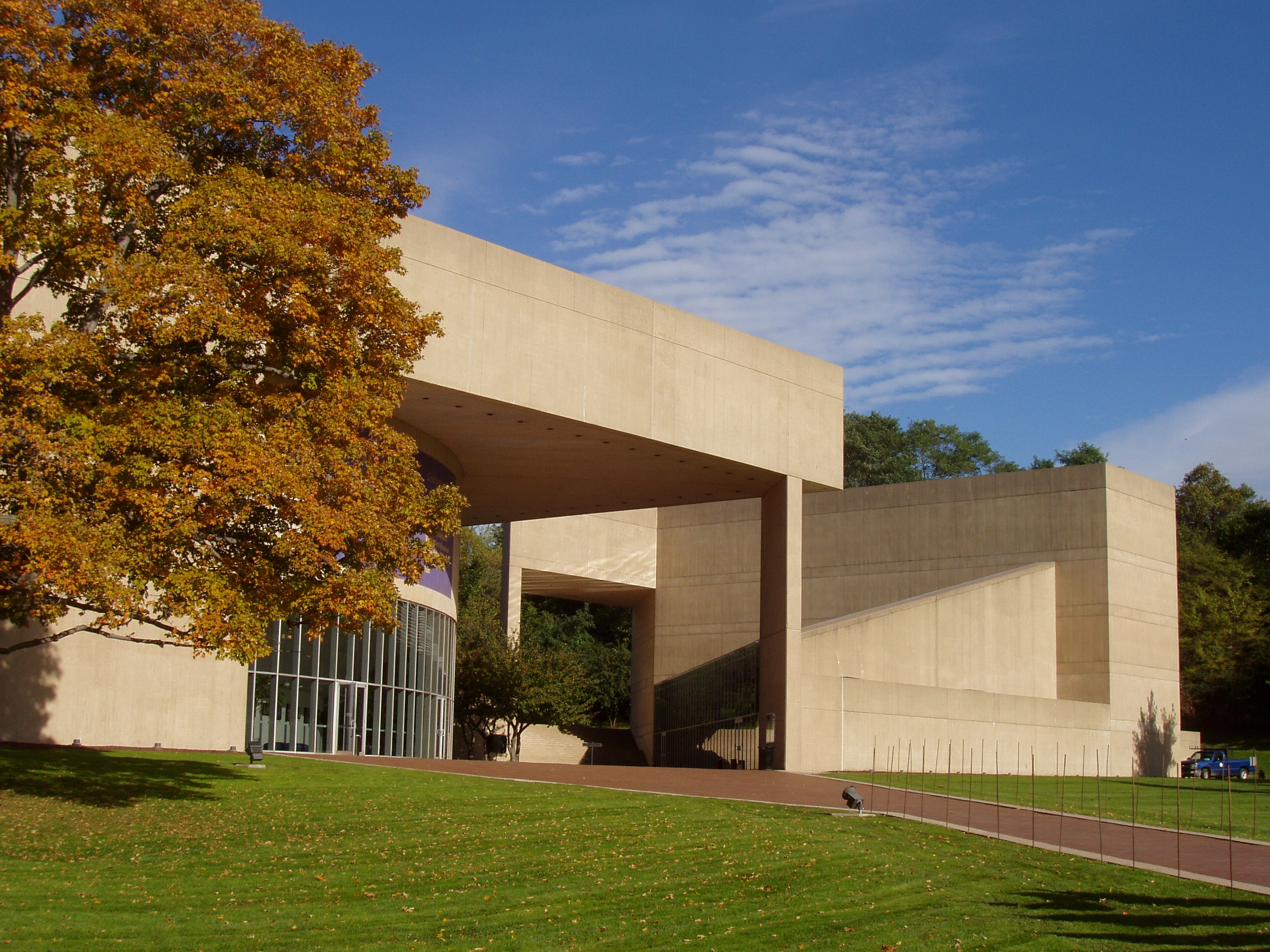
Paul Mellon Arts Center, designed by I. M. Pei.

- Choate Rosemary Hall
- Oakdale Theatre
- Paul Mellon Arts Center
- Yalesville Underpass

=== National Register of Historic Places ===
Ten buildings and districts in Wallingford are listed on the National Register of Historic Places:

- Center Street Cemetery, added August 1, 1997
- Franklin Johnson House, added November 23, 1998
- John Barker House, added August 3, 1974
- Joseph Blakeslee House, added April 13, 1998
- Nehemiah Royce House, added August 24, 1998
- Samuel Parsons House, added April 12, 1982
- Samuel Simpson House, added June 18, 1986
- Theophilus Jones House, added January 30, 1992
- Wallingford Center Historic District, added December 2, 1993
- Wallingford railroad station, added November 19, 1993

== General references ==
- Davis, Charles Henry Stanley (1870). History of Wallingford, Conn., from Its Settlement in 1670 to the Present Time, Including Meriden, which was One of Its Parishes until 1806, and Cheshire, which was Incorporated in 1780. Meriden, CT: Charles Henry Stanley Davis.
- Gillespie, Charles Bancroft (1895). Souvenir History of Wallingford, Connecticut, 1895. New Haven, CT: Journal Publishing Co.
- Kendrick, John B. (1878). History of the Wallingford Disaster. Hartford, CT: Case, Lockwood and Brainard Co.
