= George Wyllys =

American politician

4th Governor of the Colony of Connecticut
- In office 1642–1643
- Preceded by: John Haynes
- Succeeded by: John Haynes

Personal details
- Born: 1590 Fenny Compton, Warwickshire, England
- Died: 9 March 1644/5 Hartford, Connecticut
- Spouse(s): Bridget Yonge/Young; Mary Brisbey

George Wyllys or Wyllis (1590 – 9 March 1645) served for a year (1642–1643) as one of the early governors of the Connecticut Colony.

Coat of Arms of George Wyllis

Born at the manor of Fenny Compton in Warwickshire, England, to Richard and Hester (Chambers) Willis, part of an old, wealthy family. He attended several universities, "but biographers make no mention of him graduating," according to an online biographical sketch of Wyllys at the Connecticut State Library and Museum Web site.

He may well have become a Puritan in his university years.

He married Bridget Yonge/Young on 2 November 1609 at the Holy Trinity Church in Stratford-on-Avon. They had three children before she died in 1629. In 1631 he married again, this time to Mrs. Mary Brisbey. They had one son.

The family emigrated to New England in the early 1630s. By 1634, Wyllys had been appointed an Assistant to the General Court of the Massachusetts Bay Colony.

In 1636, Wyllys sent his steward, William Gibbons, to Hartford along with 20 domestics and indentured servants in order to buy land and oversee construction of a house. That house was the largest home of any of Hartford's early settlers and one of the largest in Connecticut. The famous Charter Oak stood on the property.

The same street contained the homes of future Governors Wyllys, Webster, Welles, and Hopkins and was called Governor Street until, much later, its name was changed to Popieluszko Court.

It was not until 1638 that the Wyllys family arrived in Hartford. He was soon elected as one of six Assistants to the General Court in 1639–41. He became deputy governor of the colony in 1641 and in 1642 he served a year as governor. In 1643 and 1644 he again served as an Assistant to the General Court.

Rumors that the Narragansetts would form an alliance with several other tribes to destroy the English settlers prompted Wyllys and the General Court to send two delegates to a meeting in Boston which later resulted in the Articles of Confederation between the colonies of Massachusetts Bay, New Haven, and Connecticut, a compact to provide cooperation in defense of the colonies.

In December 1642, the General Court passed the colony's first penal code, which named 12 capital crimes.

After his term as governor expired, Wyllys was chosen to be a Commissioner from Connecticut to The United Colonies of New England in 1643.

On his death in Hartford on March 9, 1644/5, his estate, which included slaves, was the largest in the colony until 1680. No portrait of him is known to exist.

Wyllys' home in Hartford was torn down in 1827. He is buried in the Hartford's Ancient Burying Ground, and his name appears on the Founders Monument. Wyllys Street in Hartford is named after him. One of his direct descendants was Frank Lloyd Wright.

== See also ==
- Wyllys-Haynes Family

Political offices
Preceded by John Haynes	Governor of the Connecticut Colony; 1642-1643	Succeeded by John Haynes
