= Wyllys–Haynes family =

Political family in the United States

The Wyllys-Haynes Family is a U.S. political family with its roots in the Connecticut Colony.

== Members ==
=== George Wyllys ===
- Born: 1590 at the manor of Fenny Compton, Warwickshire, England
- Governor of Connecticut Colony, 1642-3
- Great grandfather of George Wyllys (1710–1796) (sec of state)
- 2nd great grandfather of Samuel Wyllys #2
- 5th great grandfather of Edward Partridge, Jr.

=== George Wyllys ===
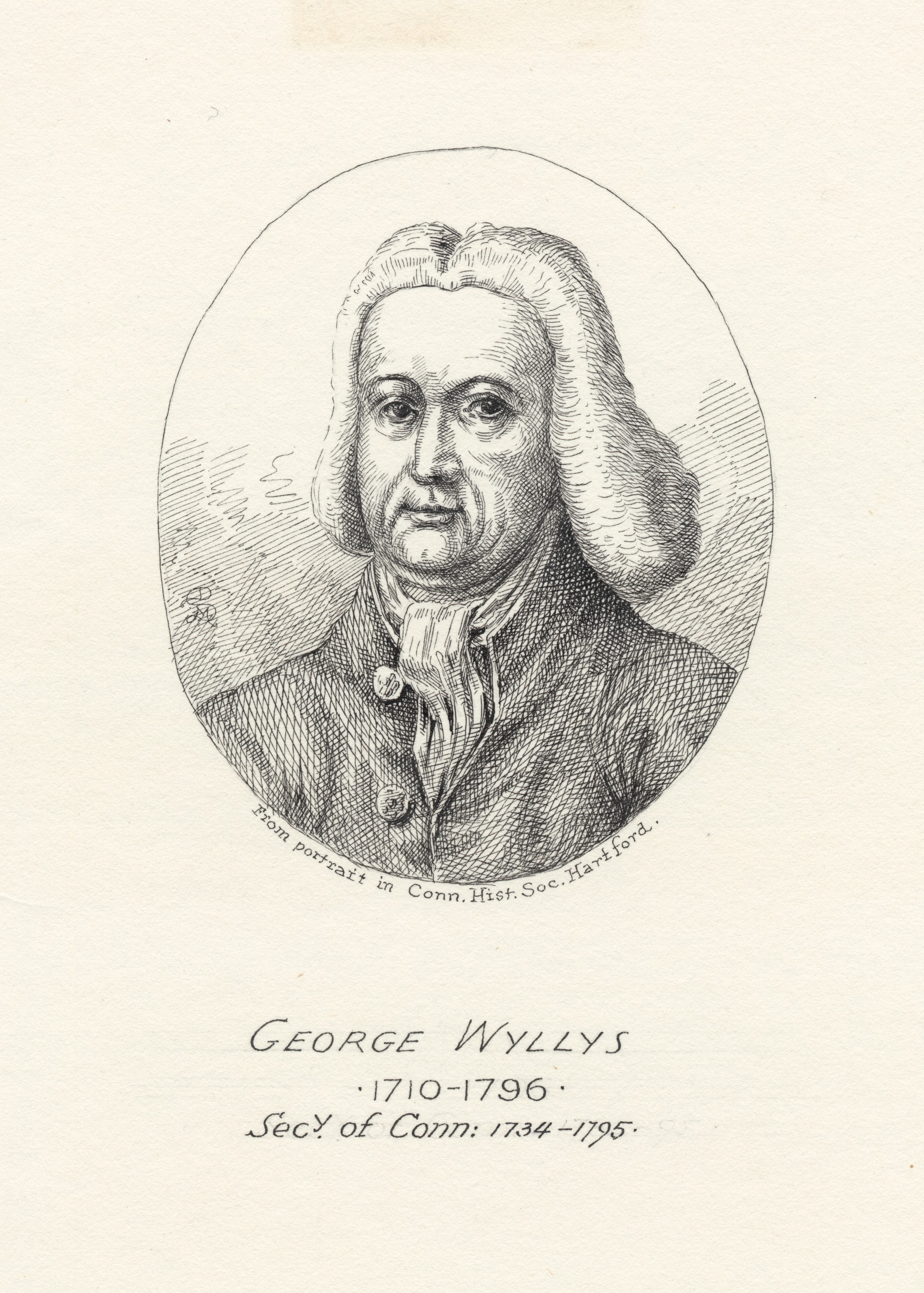
George Wyllys, 1710-1796, Secy of Conn. 1734-1795 (NYPL NYPG94-F43-419837)

- Born: 6 October 1710 in Hartford, Connecticut
- Secretary of the State of Connecticut, 1735–96
- Father of Samuel Wyllys #2
- Father of George Wyllys #3
- Great grandson of George Wyllys (governor)
- Great grandson of John Haynes
- 1st cousin 4 × removed of Edward Partridge, Jr.
- Died: 24 April 1796

=== Samuel Wyllys ===
- Connecticut Secretary of State 1796-1810
- Son of George Wyllys (sec of state)
- 2nd Great grandson of George Wyllys (governor)
- 2nd Great grandson of John Haynes

=== John Haynes ===
- Born: May 1, 1594
- Political position: Governor of the Colony of Connecticut, 1639–40, 41-42, 43-44, 45-46, 47-48, 49-50, 51-52, 53-54 (note every other term such as 40-41 someone else held the office)
- Married Mabel Harlakenden
- His daughter Ruth Haynes married Samuel Wyllys #1 son of George Wyllys
- Great grandfather of George Wyllys (sec of state)
- 2nd great grandfather of Samuel Wyllys
- 5th great grandfather of Edward Partridge, Jr.
- Died: January 1654

=== Edward Partridge, Jr. ===
- 25 June 1833—17 November 1900
- Utah Territorial Legislature 1873; Delegate to 1895 Utah Constitutional Convention
- Brother of Emily Dow Partridge who married Brigham Young (Governor of Utah Territory 1850-58) of the Richards-Young Family
- Brother of Eliza Maria Partridge Smith who married Amasa Mason Lyman (delegate to the 1849 California Constitutional Convention; Mayor of San Bernardino, California)
- Great grandson of Massachusetts congressman Oliver Partridge, delegate to the Albany Congress of 1754 and the Stamp Act Congress of 1765.
- Double 5th great grandson of Simon Bradstreet (Governor of the Massachusetts Bay Colony) of the Dudley-Winthrop Family
- 5th great grandson of George Wyllys (governor)
- 5th great grandson of John Haynes (governor)
- Double 6th great grandson of Thomas Dudley (governor) of the Dudley-Winthrop Family
- 1st cousin 4 × removed of George Wyllys (sec of state)

== Sources ==
- Gary Boyd Roberts, Three New Notable Dudley Descendants, New England Historic Genealogical Society
- Roster of Connecticut Governors
