= List of colonial governors of Connecticut =

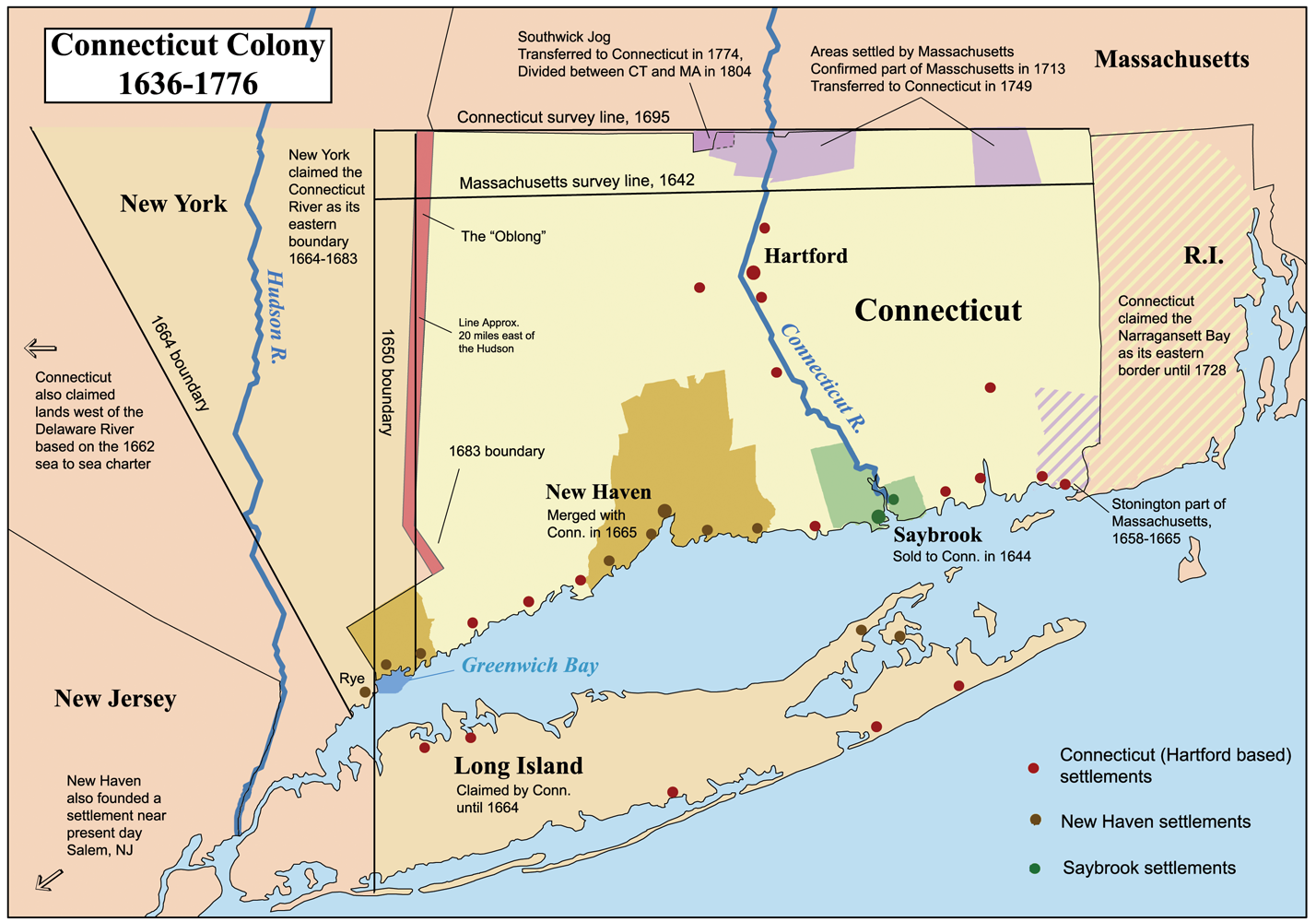
Map depicting Connecticut's early colonial settlements and boundary disputes

The territory of the United States state of Connecticut was first settled by Europeans in the 1620s, when Dutch traders established trading posts on the Connecticut River. English settlers, mainly Puritans fleeing repression in England, began to arrive in the 1630s, and a number of separate colonies were established. The first was the Saybrook Colony in 1635, based at the mouth of the Connecticut; it was followed by the Connecticut Colony (first settlement 1633, government from 1639) and the New Haven Colony (settled 1638, government from 1639). The Saybrook Colony merged with the Connecticut Colony in 1644, and the New Haven Colony was merged into Connecticut between 1662 and 1665 after Connecticut received a royal charter.

The Connecticut Colony was one of two colonies (the other was the neighboring Colony of Rhode Island and Providence Plantations) that retained its governor during the American Revolution. The last colonial governor, Jonathan Trumbull, became the state of Connecticut's first governor in 1776.

== Saybrook Colony, 1635–1644 ==
The Saybrook Colony was established in late 1635 at the mouth of the Connecticut River in present-day Old Saybrook, Connecticut by John Winthrop the Younger, son of Massachusetts Bay Colony founder and governor John Winthrop. The former was designated governor by the original settlers who included George Fenwick and Lion Gardiner. They claimed possession of the land via a deed of conveyance from Robert Rich, 2nd Earl of Warwick. The colony was named in honor of Puritan Lords Saye (William Fiennes, 1st Viscount Saye and Sele) and Brooke (Robert Greville, 2nd Baron Brooke), who were prominent Parliamentarians and the colony's principal investors.

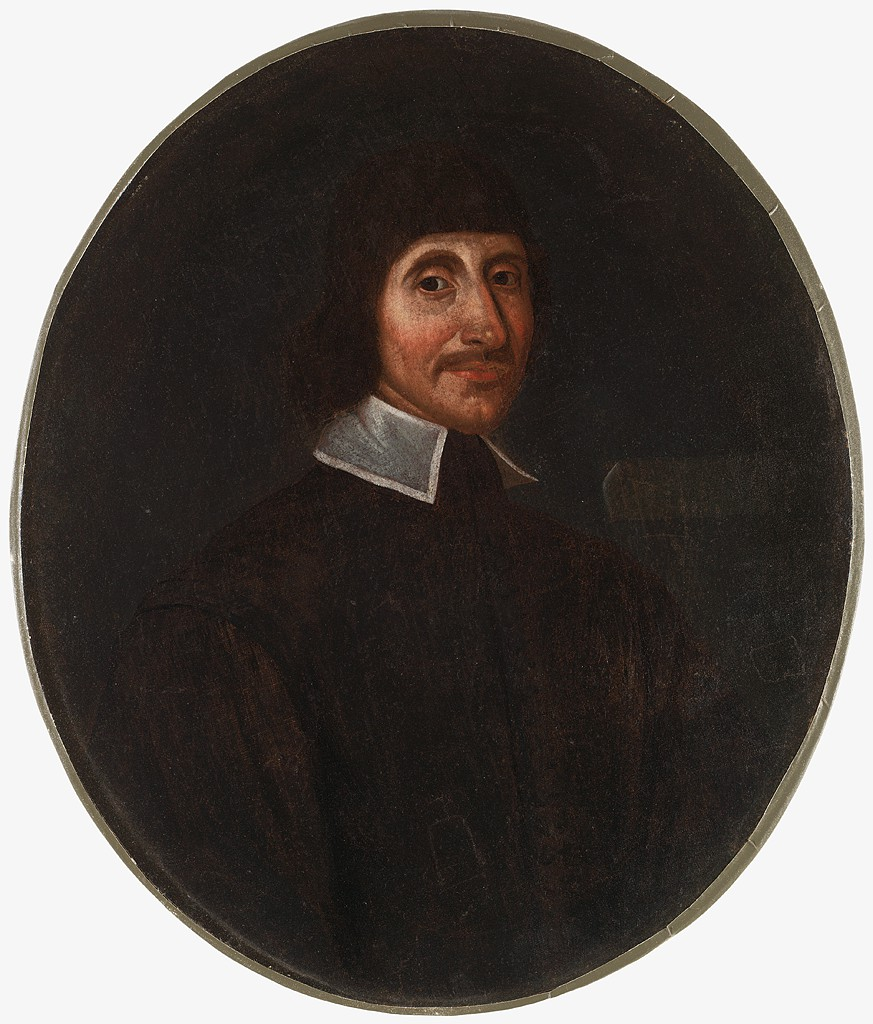
John Winthrop the Younger, the first governor of Connecticut

The colony was little more than a single community. It came under the de facto governorship upon the arrival of Fenwick, who was the only signer of the deed to actually live in the colony. In 1644 Fenwick conveyed the right of government to the flourishing Connecticut Colony, although issues surrounding this transfer led to litigation over property rights afterward. Fenwick returned to England and served in the English Civil War, and Winthrop continued to be active in Connecticut politics.

#	Governor	Took office	Left office
1	John Winthrop the Younger	1635	1639
2	George Fenwick	1639	1644

== New Haven Colony, 1639–1665 ==
The New Haven Colony was established by the Puritan colonist Theophilus Eaton, who was of the opinion that the policies of the Massachusetts Bay Colony were too lax in enforcing Puritan standards. After some exploration he purchased land from local Indians at the mouth of the Quinnipiac River in cx 1638. The colony in 1639 established a government modeled on that drafted by the leaders of the Connecticut Colony, which called for annual elections of its governor. Eaton was elected governor until his death in 1658. Following the restoration of King Charles II to the English throne in 1660, the colony became a subject of his ire when it harbored two fugitive regicides of Charles I, Edward Whalley and William Goffe. In 1662 Charles II issued a royal charter for the Connecticut Colony that merged the two colonies. The process of merger was not completed until 1665. The colony's last governor, William Leete, also later served as governor of Connecticut.

#	Governor	Took office	Left office
1	Theophilus Eaton	1639	1658
2	Francis Newman	1658	1660
3	William Leete	1661	1665

== Connecticut Colony, 1639–1776 ==
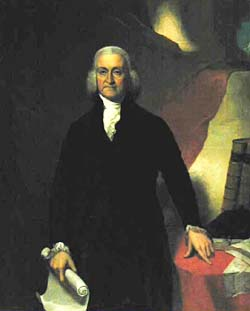
Jonathan Trumbull, the last governor of the Connecticut Colony

The Connecticut Colony was formed from the towns of Hartford, Windsor and Wethersfield. Between 1639 and 1655, consecutive terms were not allowed, so the governorship rotated between John Haynes and Edward Hopkins each year, except for 1642 when George Wyllys served. Thomas Welles and John Winthrop the Younger also served non-consecutive terms.

John Winthrop the Younger was the governor of the combined Connecticut Colony in 1662, the year it received its royal charter. However, the regime change did not include an election for governor; Winthrop was merely retained in his position. The merger took three years to complete, during which time William Leete remained in New Haven. A similar situation happened to Jonathan Trumbull in 1776; the royal government was discarded for state government without a gubernatorial election, making Trumbull the independent state's first governor.

Sir Edmund Andros attempted to merge Connecticut into the Dominion of New England in 1687. As governor of the Province of New York in the 1670s, he had attempted to enforce the Duke of York's claims to territories as far east as the Connecticut River, and his assumption of Dominion control in October 1687 was marked by a failed attempt to seize the colonial charter. Andros is pointedly excluded from numbered lists of Connecticut governors; however, his portrait hangs, along with those of other governors, in Memorial Hall in the Connecticut State Supreme Court/State Library/State Museum building across from the State Capitol in Hartford. As Andros failed to take the Connecticut Charter, Connecticut was never absorbed into the Dominion of New England.

Governors of the Connecticut Colony
No.	Governor	Term in office	Party	Deputy Governor
1	John Haynes (1594–c. 1653)	1639 – 1640	No party	Roger Ludlow
2	Edward Hopkins (1600–1657)	1640 – 1641	No party	John Haynes
3	John Haynes (1594–c. 1653)	1641 – 1642	No party	George Wyllys
4	George Wyllys (1590–1645)	1642 – 1643	No party	Roger Ludlow
5	John Haynes (1594–c. 1653)	1643 – 1644	No party	Edward Hopkins
6	Edward Hopkins (1600–1657)	1644 – 1645	No party	John Haynes
7	John Haynes (1594–c. 1653)	1645 – 1646	No party	Edward Hopkins
8	Edward Hopkins (1600–1657)	1646 – 1647	No party	John Haynes
9	John Haynes (1594–c. 1653)	1647 – 1648	No party	Edward Hopkins
10	Edward Hopkins (1600–1657)	1648 – 1649	No party	Roger Ludlow
11	John Haynes (1594–c. 1653)	1649 – 1650	No party	Edward Hopkins
12	Edward Hopkins (1600–1657)	1650 – 1651	No party	John Haynes
13	John Haynes (1594–c. 1653)	1651 – 1652	No party	Edward Hopkins
14	Edward Hopkins (1600–1657)	1652 – 1653	No party	John Haynes
15	John Haynes (1594–c. 1653)	1653 – 1654	No party	Edward Hopkins
16	Edward Hopkins (1600–1657)	1654 – 1655	No party	Thomas Welles
16	Thomas Welles (c. 1594–1660)	1655 – 1656	No party	John Webster
17	John Webster (c. 1590–1661)	1656 – 1657	No party	Thomas Welles
18	John Winthrop the Younger (1606–1676)	1657 – 1658	No party	Thomas Welles
19	Thomas Welles (c. 1594–1660)	1658 – 1659	No party	John Winthrop the Younger John Mason
20	John Winthrop the Younger (1606–1676)	1659 – 1676	No party	John Mason
21	William Leete (c. 1612–1683)	1676 – 1683	No party	Robert Treat
22	Robert Treat (1624–1710)	1683 – 1698	No party	James Bishop William Jones
23	Fitz-John Winthrop (1637–1707)	1698 – November 27, 1707	No party	Robert Treat
24	Gurdon Saltonstall (1666–1724)	1708 – September 20, 1724	No party	Nathan Gold
25	Joseph Talcott (1669–1741)	1724 – October 11, 1741	No party	Jonathan Law
26	Jonathan Law (1674–1750)	1741 – November 6, 1750	No party	Roger Wolcott
27	Roger Wolcott (1679–1767)	1750 – 1754	No party	Thomas Fitch
28	Thomas Fitch (c. 1699–1774)	1754 – 1766	No party	William Pitkin
29	William Pitkin (1694–1769)	1766 – October 1, 1769	No party	Jonathan Trumbull
30	Jonathan Trumbull (1714–1799)	October 1, 1769 – October 10, 1776	No party	Matthew Griswold
