= Edward Hopkins =

English colonist and politician (1600–1657)

- Hopkins's coat of arms

Governor of the Colony of Connecticut
- In office 1640 – 1655 (7 separate terms)

Deputy Governor of the Colony of Connecticut
- In office 1643 – 1653 (6 separate terms)

Secretary of the Colony of Connecticut
- In office 1639–1640

Assistant to the General Court
- In office 1639–1640

Commissioner for the Connecticut Colony
- In office 1643–1651
- Preceded by: office established
- Succeeded by: John Cullick

Member of Parliament for Dartmouth
- In office 1656–1657

Personal details
- Born: 1600 Shrewsbury, Shropshire, England
- Died: March 1657 (aged 56–57) London
- Spouse: Ann Yale

Edward Hopkins (1600 – March 1657) was an English colonist and politician and 2nd Governor of the Connecticut Colony. Active on both sides of the Atlantic, he was a founder of the New Haven and Connecticut colonies, serving seven one-year terms as Governor of Connecticut. He returned to England in the 1650s, where he was politically active in the administration of Oliver Cromwell as a Lord Commissioner of the Admiralty and member of Parliament. He remained in England despite being elected Governor of Connecticut in 1655, and died in London in 1657.

Hopkins' will left substantial assets, in trust, for "Encouragement unto those forreign Plantations for the breeding up of Hopefull youth in the way of Learning both at ye Gramar School & Colledge for the publick Service of the Country in future times [and] for the upholding & promoting of the Kingdom of the Lord Jesus Christ in those parts of the earth." However, the inchoate state of American law on trusts kept The Charity of Edward Hopkins (as this trust is now known) mired in litigation for the next 135 years. The eventual resolution of the case made Harvard College the major beneficiary of the trust, along with the Hopkins School of New Haven, Connecticut, and other schools and institutions.

As a side effect of the early administration of the trust, the town of Hopkinton, Massachusetts, was named after him after Harvard College bought 12 500 acres of land there from the Hopkins endowment.

== Biography ==
Edward Hopkins was born in 1600 in Shrewsbury, Shropshire to Edward Hopkins and Katharine Lello Hopkins. Educated at Shrewsbury School, he then went to London where he became a successful merchant engaging in trade with the Near East. He may have benefited from connections with his uncle, Sir Henry Lello, who served for a time as English Ambassador to the Ottoman Empire, Warden of the Fleet Prison, and Keeper of the Palace of Westminster. The office of Warden would be inherited by his brother Henry Hopkins.

He married the sister of Capt. Thomas Yale, named Ann Yale, (born about 1615, daughter of Thomas Yale Sr. and Ann (Lloyd) Yale of Wales, and step-daughter of Theophilus Eaton) in 1636 or 1637 in Hartford, Connecticut). Her grandfather was Chancellor David Yale of Chester, and her nephews were Capt. Thomas Yale of Wallingford, and Elihu Yale, benefactor of Yale College.

He became involved in efforts to establish a colony on the shore of Long Island Sound that were under the aegis of the Lord Say and Sele and Baron Brooke. Although Hopkins was not apparently a signer of the Saybrook Colony's patent, he was involved in procuring provisions for the colonization effort's inaugural expedition in 1635, headed by Lion Gardiner. He was in charge of the supplies for HMS Abigail, a fireship, and developed a life-long friendship with John Winthrop Jr., son of Governor Winthrop of Massachusetts. After restrictions were placed on emigration to New England, the proprietors of the venture essentially abandoned it.

In 1637 he joined a venture led by Theophilus Eaton, an indirect relation through his wife, and John Davenport which led to the establishment of a settlement at the mouth of the Quinnipiac River and the founding of the New Haven Colony. Two months later he was sent north to recently founded Hartford on the Connecticut River to negotiate additional land purchases for the New Haven colonists, but decided to instead stay in Hartford, becoming one of the early settlers of the Connecticut Colony. In the colony's first election in 1639 he became one of several Assistants to the General Court, along with George Wyllys, Thomas Welles, and John Webster.

Then, in 1640 Hopkins was elected Governor. Because the colony's charter forbade reelection to the Governorship, Hopkins and John Haynes (Connecticut's first Governor) traded off as Governor (save one term by George Wyllys) between 1639 and 1655, each serving as Deputy Governor to the other when not Governor. He was also made Secretary of the Colony.

Hopkins survived an assassination attempt in 1646 by a Native American tribe, made because Connecticut protected the chief of their rival tribe. He advocated the New England Confederation, serving as one of its commissioners. Even though he invested significantly in the colony, he also made money, supplying the colony with provisions from Europe. He had considerable wealth in England, and in Connecticut he invested in land, owned a mill, had an early monopoly on the fur trade, developed the cotton industry, and owned a ship that traded goods to other colonial and English markets.

In 1650 he negotiated the Treaty of Hartford with Dutch Director-General of New Netherland Peter Stuyvesant of the Stuyvesant family, which established boundaries between the Dutch and English colonies in Connecticut and Long-Island.

Hopkins returned to England several times during his rotating stints as Governor. Oliver Cromwell appointed him a Commissioner of the Royal Navy and later a Lord Commissioner of the Admiralty; where the members were governing the Board of Admiralty of England as one of the Great Officers of State. He also oversaw the printing of the New Haven Colony's first laws, and served in the English Parliament during Cromwell's reign.

Hopkins was elected Connecticut's Governor a final time in 1655 (despite still being in England) as an attempt by Connecticut residents to draw back their well-respected Governor. He did not return, however, and the lieutenant Governor Thomas Welles served out Hopkins' final term. Hopkins died in March 1657 in the London parish of St Olave Hart Street. His wife, Ann Yale, died December 14, 1698, at the age of 83 at Plas Gronow, the Yale family estate in Wales.

== Legacy ==
Money from Hopkins' estate funded the creation of Hopkins School in New Haven, Connecticut, the wish of John Davenport, founder of the New Haven colony. In addition, Hopkins Classical School in Cambridge, Massachusetts, and Hopkins Academy also trace their roots to Edward Hopkins. Hopkinton, Massachusetts, named for him, was established on land purchased using funds from his estate.

== Sources ==
- "The Charity of Edward Hopkins: The Hazards of Charitable Trusts in Colonial America" (PDF). Archived from the original (PDF) on August 11, 2011.
- An Account of the Trust Administered by the Trustees of the Charity of Edward Hopkins alt

Political offices
Preceded by John Haynes, George Wyllys	Governor of the Connecticut Colony; 1640-1656 (seven separate one-year terms)	Succeeded by John Haynes, Thomas Welles
Parliament of England
Preceded by Thomas Boone	Member of Parliament representing Dartmouth; 1656-1657	Succeeded by Thomas Boone
