= John Haynes (governor) =

English politician (1594–1653/4)

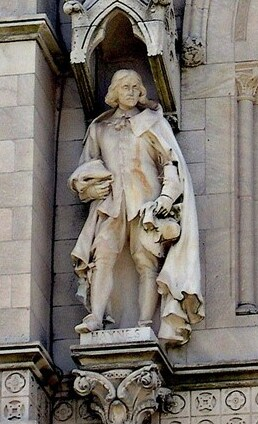

4th Governor of the Massachusetts Bay Colony
- In office 1635–1636
- Preceded by: Thomas Dudley
- Succeeded by: Henry Vane

1st Governor of the Colony of Connecticut
- In office 1639 – 1654 (8 separate terms)

Personal details
- Born: May 1, 1594 Essex, England
- Died: c. January 9, 1653/4 (aged 59) Hartford, Connecticut
- Spouse: Mabel Harlekenden

John Haynes (May 1, 1594 – c. January 9, 1653/4), also sometimes spelled Haines, was a colonial magistrate and one of the founders of the Connecticut Colony. He served one term as governor of the Massachusetts Bay Colony and was the first governor of Connecticut, ultimately serving eight separate terms. Although Colonial Connecticut prohibited Governors from serving consecutive terms at the time, "John Haynes was so popular with the colonists that he served alternately as governor and often as deputy governor from 1639 to his death in 1653."

Haynes was influential in the drafting of laws and legal frameworks in both Massachusetts and Connecticut. He was on the committee that drafted the Fundamental Orders of Connecticut, which has been called one of the first written constitutions. He also invested most of his fortune in Connecticut, "to the ruine of his famylye in Englande".

== Early life ==
Coat of Arms of John Haynes

Haynes was born on May 1, 1594, likely at Messing, Essex, England, the eldest son of John Haynes and Mary Michel Haynes. The family was an armigerous gentry or 'visitation family' who had lived at Codicote, Hertfordshire, and at Great Haddam. In 1605, when he was eleven, his father died, and he eventually inherited the family's many properties. It is possible that Haynes attended Cambridge; during the relevant time period, two John Hayneses are listed as attending. By about 1616, Haynes was living at Gurney's Manor, Hingham, Norfolk, a hotbed of Puritan sentiment, where Haynes was Lord of the manor. There he married Mary Thorneton, the daughter of Norfolk nobility, with whom he had six children. In 1627, his wife Mary died and was buried at St Andrew's Church in Hingham. In the early 1620s, he purchased Copford Hall, near Colchester in Essex; this estate alone was reported to produce £1,100 per year.

Essex was also a Puritan center, and Haynes was greatly influenced by the pastor Thomas Hooker, who was a close friend. In about 1630, John Winthrop and John Humphreys, two of the founders of the Massachusetts Bay Colony, extended invitations to Hooker and Haynes to join them in the New World. Apparently leaving his minor children behind, Haynes emigrated in 1633, sailing aboard the Griffin with Hooker. They settled first at Newtowne (later renamed Cambridge), where Haynes was the guest of Thomas Dudley until his own house was ready.

== Massachusetts Bay Colony ==
As a man of some means, (Winthrop referred to him as a "man of great estate") in 1634, Haynes was admitted as a freeman and elected to the colony's council of assistants. He was also named to a committee overseeing military matters, a position that assumed some importance when war broke out with the Pequot tribe that year. The assistants were called on to consider the controversial defacement of the English flag by John Endecott in 1634. Claiming that St George's Cross was a symbol of popery, he had cut it from the Salem militia company's banner. Haynes was part of a moderate faction that disagreed with Endecott's action, claiming that the cross had been reduced to a symbol of nationalism. For his action, Endecott was censured and deprived of serving in any offices for one year.

In 1634, Haynes served in a variety of municipal capacities. He was a Cambridge selectman and served on a commission that decided the boundary between Boston and Charlestown. He was elected governor in 1635, winning an election that Roger Ludlow had been expected to win. Haynes had argued for the lowering of taxes; Ludlow also alleged that the deputies of some towns had made private agreements that concerned the vote before it occurred. Ludlow, who was not even elected as an assistant, was apparently motivated by his loss to leave the colony for a settlement on the Connecticut River.

Haynes' one-year term as governor was marked by political conflict between a faction led by Haynes, Hooker, and Dudley, and another led by Winthrop. The major disagreement between them concerned the strictness of judicial procedures and the process of rendering judgments; the Haynes faction believed that Winthrop had been lax in some of his decisions. The conservative faction was successful in enacting regulations for stricter judicial procedures; it also passed legislation banning the smoking of tobacco and restricting overly ostentatious or fashionable clothing. Haynes also presided over the trial and banishment of Roger Williams, an act that Williams reports Haynes later expressed some regret over.

== Connecticut Colony ==
In 1635, a significant religious division began to grow in the Massachusetts colony. Anne Hutchinson and others espoused the Antinomianist view that the laws of the Church of England did not apply to them, while others argued the opposing Legalist position. Harsh reactions to the controversy may have played a role in the decision by Hooker, and consequently Haynes, to leave the colony for new settlements on the Connecticut River. Historians have also cited shortages of land and food as a reason for this migration, and political competition between Haynes and Winthrop. Winthrop recorded that Hooker's company was motivated by "the strong bent of their spirits to remove".

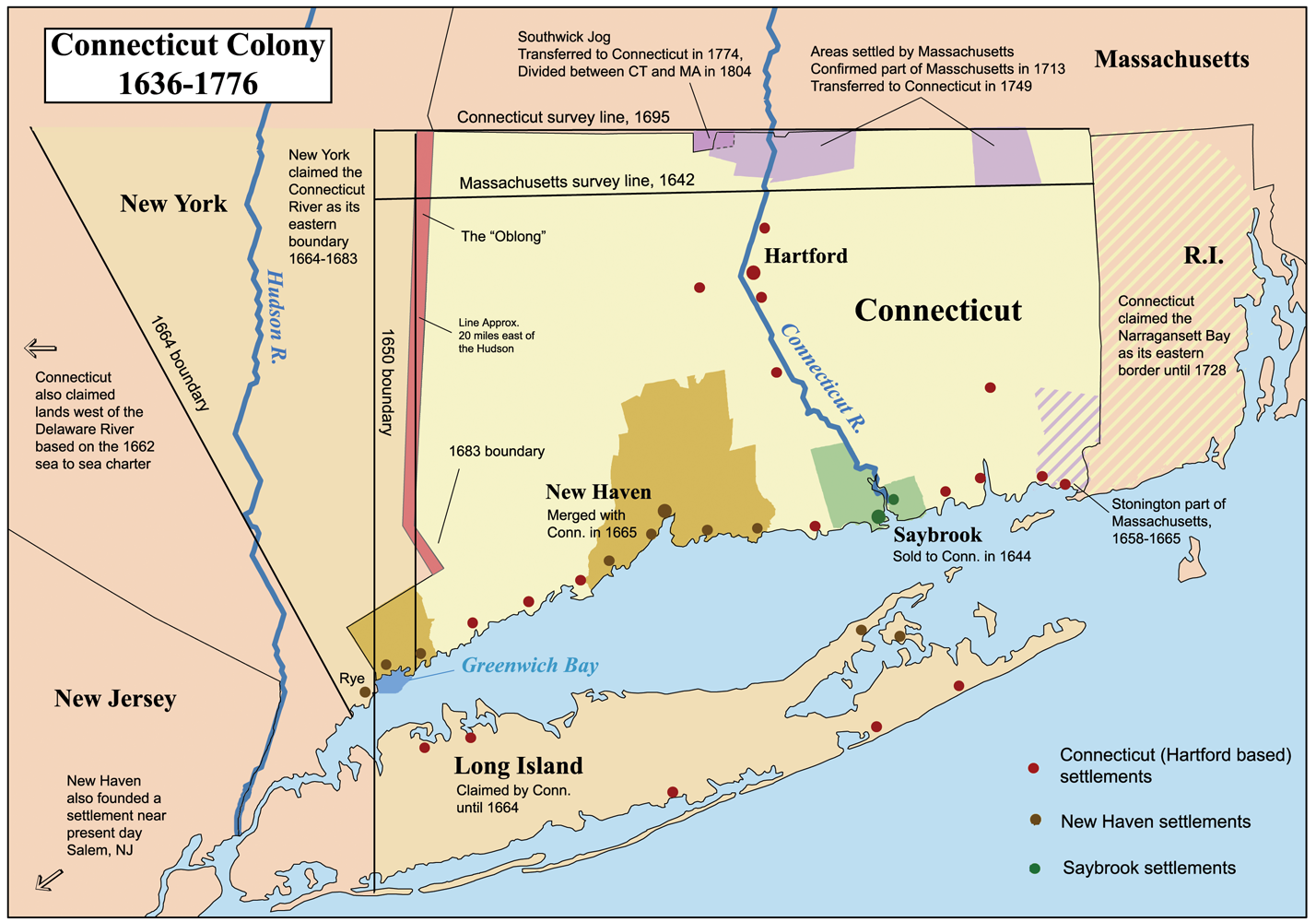
Map that depicts the historic border changes of the Connecticut Colony

Haynes, while making arrangements to follow Hooker, continued to be involved in Massachusetts through 1636, serving as an assistant and as colonel of one of the colony's militia regiments. His lieutenant colonel was Roger Harlakenden, who in 1635 came over from England with his sister Mabel. John and Mabel were married in 1636; they had five children.

Haynes joined Hooker at the settlement they called Hartford in 1637. The colonial settlements on the river were established without any sort of royal charter and were not within the bounds of the Massachusetts Bay Colony. For the first two years, the few small settlements were governed by a general court of magistrates, headed by Haynes, and were likely preoccupied with the ongoing conflict with the Pequots. After the war ended in late 1638, the magistrates began drafting a body of principles and laws; these were ratified in January 1638/9. Now known as the Fundamental Orders of Connecticut, this document has been called the "first written constitution". The chief architects of the Fundamental Orders were Ludlow, the colony's principal legal mind, Haynes, and Thomas Hooker, who was known to advocate for the liberties the document enshrines.

Pursuant to the terms of this constitution, elections were held on April 11, 1639, and Haynes was elected as the colony's first governor. Because of restrictions in the constitution that disallowed consecutive terms, he was in and out of the office of governor a total of eight times between 1639 and his death in 1653/4. During most of the years he was not governor, he was instead the deputy governor.

Due to a lack of detailed documentation, the exact role Haynes played in the colony's political activities is unclear. One of his more notable achievements was the negotiations with some of the neighboring colonies that led to the creation of the New England Confederation in 1643. This organization was a loose confederation of the Connecticut, Massachusetts Bay, New Haven, and Plymouth Colonies, principally established to coordinate defense against common threats. For Connecticut, the major threats came from Indians and from the Dutch of the New Netherlands to the west. In particular, the smaller colonies benefited from this confederation at the expense of the significantly more populous Massachusetts colony. During his terms in office, he was called upon to mediate disputes between local Indians and to negotiate with Dutch representatives of the New Netherlands, who claimed land south of Hartford on the Connecticut River. When one Dutch trader complained about the seizure by some Englishmen of land he claimed, Haynes responded that because the Dutchman had done nothing to develop the land, and that because "it was a sin to let such rich land ... lie uncultivated", he had effectively forfeited his claim. This dispute resulted in minor military confrontations between the English and Dutch in the 1640s and was resolved temporarily in the 1650 Treaty of Hartford, in which the Dutch ceded their claims on the river. Some territorial disputes continued even after the English took New Netherlands from the Dutch in 1664, and the territory described in the Duke of York's charter overlapped that of Connecticut.

== Death and legacy ==
Contrary to the engraved date on his tombstone in Hartford's Ancient Burying Ground, Haynes did not die on March 1, 1653/4. A letter, written by John Winthrop the Younger on January 9, 1653/4, mentions his recent death. The Connecticut General Court issued a statement on March 6, calling for a "day of humiliation" following the "sudden death of our late Governor". Haynes' son, Hezekiah, a military officer who served in the English Civil War, noted that his father had invested between £7,000 and £8,000 in the colony "to the ruine of his famylye in Englande"; his estate was valued at about £1,500. Haynes was a significant landowner in the Hartford area, and he and Edward Hopkins operated a mill in the town. Haynes' daughter Ruth married Samuel Wyllys, the son of another Connecticut founder, George Wyllys. Their descendants have continued the legacy of political involvement in Connecticut and elsewhere.
