= New England Confederation =

1643–1686 colonial alliance

Coordinates: 42°01′49″N 72°08′12″W

United Colonies of New England
- 1643–1686
- Flag

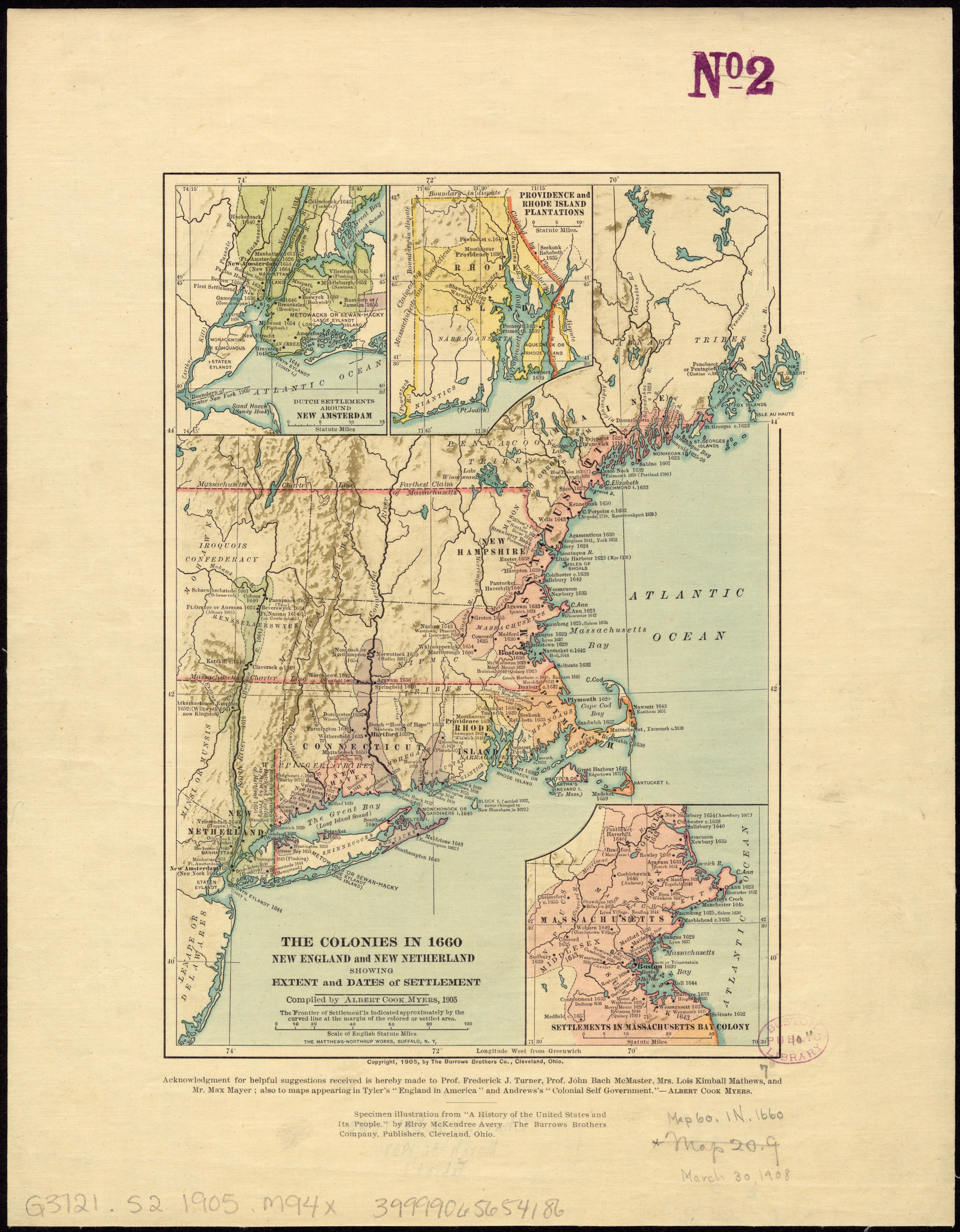
- New England in 1660
- Status: Disestablished
- Capital: None, meeting place rotated between: Boston, Hartford, New Haven, Plymouth
- Common languages: English, Massachusett, Mi'kmaq
- Religion: Congregationalism
- Government: Directorial confederation
- Commissioners
  - 1643 (first): William Collier; Thomas Dudley; Edward Winslow; Theophilus Eaton; George Fenwick; Thomas Gregson; Edward Hopkins; John Winthrop
  - 1686 (last): John Allyn; William Bradford IV; Thomas Hinckley; Samuel Nowell; William Stoughton; John Talcott; John Walley
- Legislature: None (legislative power was reserved for individual colonial assemblies)
- Historical era: Great Migration, British colonization of the Americas, American Indian Wars, Anglo-Dutch Wars
  - Established: 1643
  - Disestablished: 1686

The United Colonies of New England, commonly known as the New England Confederation, was a confederal alliance of the New England colonies of Massachusetts Bay (including Norfolk County), Plymouth, Saybrook (Connecticut), and New Haven formed in May 1643, during the English Civil War. Its primary purpose was to unite the Puritan colonies in support of the Congregational church, and for defense against the Native Americans and the Dutch colony of New Netherland. It was the first milestone on the long road to colonial unity and was established as a direct result of a war that started between the Indigenous Mohegan and Narragansett nations. Its charter provided for the return of fugitive criminals and indentured servants, and served as a forum for resolving inter-colonial disputes. In practice, none of the goals were accomplished.

The confederation was weakened in 1654 after Massachusetts Bay refused to join an expedition against New Netherland during the First Anglo-Dutch War, although it regained importance during King Philip's War in 1675. It was dissolved after numerous colonial charters were revoked in the early 1680s.

John Quincy Adams remarked at a meeting of the Massachusetts Historical Society on the 200th anniversary of the Confederation's founding:

The New England confederacy was destined to a life of less than forty years' duration. Its history, like that of other confederacies, presents a record of incessant discord--of encroachments by the most powerful party upon the weaker members, and of disregard, by all the separate members, of the conclusions adopted by the whole body. Still the main purpose of the union was accomplished.

== Treaty ==
The full name of the 1643 treaty was "The Articles of Confederation between the Plantations under the Government of the Massachusetts, the Plantations under the Government of New Plymouth, the Plantations under the Government of Connecticut, and the Government of New Haven with the Plantations in Combination therewith". The colonies of New England were expanding territorially and the populations growing, and their contact was increasing with other European colonial settlements, as well as with surrounding Native American tribes. New England colonial leaders sought a way allowing the individual colonies to coordinate a collective defense of New England. The New England leaders also felt that they were unique among the American colonies, and they hoped to band together to preserve their Puritan values. The treaty calls on the New England colonies to act as a nation, saying that they share a way of life and religion. This alliance was meant to be a perpetual mode of defense and communication among the colonies themselves and with any foreign entities.

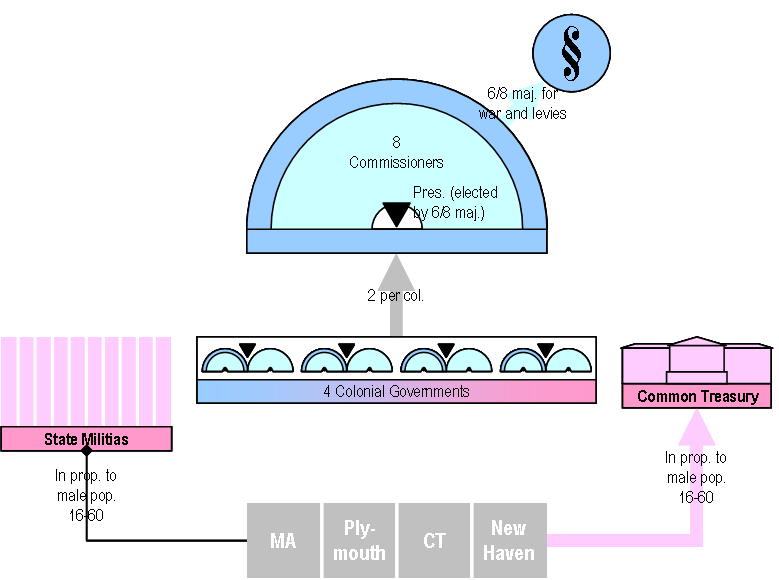
The Articles of Confederation of the United Colonies of New England, 1643

The treaty outlining the alliance contained the following clauses, in summary:

- The colonies should form into a league of friendship with mutual military assurance. This relationship would ensure the communal safety and welfare of the colonies and preserve their Puritan way of life.
- The New England colonies were to maintain their current territory. Their jurisdictions would remain unfettered by the other members of the confederation, and any changes made would have to be agreed upon by the other members.
- All members of the confederation were bound to each other if war occurred. This meant that they had to contribute to the war whatever they were capable of in terms of men and provisions. The colonies would also be obligated to provide a census of all their available men for militia. All men from 16 to 60 were to be considered eligible for service. Any gains from military conflict were to be divided in a just manner among the confederation.
- If any member of the confederation came under attack, the other members must come to their aid without delay. This assistance would take place proportionally. Massachusetts Bay would be required to send 100 armed and supplied men, the other colonies 45 armed and supplied men or less, based on size and population. If a greater number of men or supplies is needed, then the commissioners of the Confederation would need to approve of the measure.
- Two commissioners were to be chosen from each province to administer martial affairs. The commissioners were to meet once a year on the first Thursday in September, rotating the location among the colonies.
- The commissioners would select a president from among themselves; he would not have any extra powers and would serve a purely administrative function.
- Commissioners would have power to draft law and codes that would benefit the general welfare of the Confederation. These laws would be to ensure friendly relations among the provinces and security for the Confederation. There was also to be cooperation between provinces in terms of the return of fugitives and runaway servants.
- No member colony was to undertake any act of war or conflict without the consent of the others. This would be to prevent smaller provinces from being forced to engage in a war that they did not have the resources to fight. Any offensive war would need approval of six of the eight Commissioners.
- Four Commissioners could make administrative decisions in extenuating circumstances, but any decision would have to be within bounds of the pledged men and resources. No decision concerning bills or levies could be made with less than six commissioners present.
- If any member province of the Confederation were to break any of the clauses, then the remaining provinces' commissioners were to meet and decide upon any further action.

The Massachusetts General Court and the commissioners from Saybrook Colony and New Haven Colony agreed to the treaty on May 19, 1643. The General Court of the Plymouth Colony agreed to it on August 29.

=== Signatories ===
Massachusetts Bay

- Increase Nowell, Secretary of the General Court

Connecticut Colony

- John Haynes, Commissioner
- Edward Hopkins, Commissioner

New Haven Colony

- Theophilus Eaton, Commissioner
- Thomas Gregson, Commissioner

Plymouth Colony

- Edward Winslow, Commissioner
- William Collier, Commissioner

== Commissioners ==
Commissioners
Year	Meeting Place	Connecticut River	Massachusetts Bay	New Haven	Plymouth
1643	Boston	George Fenwick, Edward Hopkins	Thomas Dudley, John Winthrop	Theophilus Eaton, Thomas Gregson, Richard Malbon	William Collier, Edward Winslow
1644	Hartford	John Brown, George Fenwick, Edward Hopkins	Simon Bradstreet, William Hathorne	Edward Winslow, Theophilus Eaton	Thomas Gregson
1645	Boston	John Brown, George Fenwick, Edward Hopkins	Herbert Pelham, John Winthrop	Theophilus Eaton, Stephen Goodyear	Thomas Prence
1646	New Haven	John Brown, John Haynes, Edward Hopkins	Herbert Pelhem	Theophilius Eaton, Stephen Goodyear	John Endicott, Timothy Hatherit
1647	Boston	John Brown, George Fenwick, Edward Hopkins, John Mason, William Whiting†	Simon Bradstreet	Theophilus Eaton, Stephen Goodyear	William Bradford, John Endicott
1648	Plymouth	John Brown, George Fenwick, Edward Hopkins, Roger Ludlow	Simon Bradstreet	John Astwood, Theophilus Eaton	William Bradford, John Endicott
1649	Boston	John Brown, Edward Hopkins, Thomas Welles	Simon Bradstreet, Thomas Dudley	John Astwood, Theophilus Eaton	William Bradford, Thomas Prence
1650	Hartford	John Brown, John Haynes, Edward Hopkins	Simon Bradstreet, William Hathorne	Theophilus Eaton, Stephen Goodyear	N/A
1651	New Haven	John Brown, Edward Hopkins, John Ludlow	Simon Bradstreet, William Hathorne	Theophilus Eaton, Stephen Goodyear	Timothy Hatherly
1652	Plymouth	John Brown, John Cullick, John Ludlow	Simon Bradstreet, WIlliam Hathorne	John Astwood, Theophilus Eaton	William Bradford
1653	Boston	John Brown, John Cullick, John Ludlow	Simon Bradstreet, William Hathorne	John Astwood, Theophilus Eaton	Thomas Prence
1654	Hartford	John Brown, John Mason, John Webster	Simon Bradstreet, Daniel Denison	Theophilus Eaton, Samuel Mason, Francis Newman	Thomas Prence
1655	New Haven	John Brown, John Cullick, John Mason	Simon Bradstreet, Daniel Denison	Theophilus Eaton	James Cudworth
1656	Plymouth	John Mason, John Talcott the elder	Simon Bradstreet, Daniel Denison	Theophilus Eaton	William Bradford, Thomas Prence
1657	Boston	John Talcott the elder	Simon Bradstreet, Daniel Denison	Theophilus Eaton	James Cudworth, Thomas Prence
1658	Boston	John Talcott the elder, Thomas Welles, John Winthrop the Younger.	Simon Bradstreet	Theophilus Eaton, Samuel Mason, Francis Newman	John Endicott, Thomas Prence, Josiah Winslow
1659	Hartford	John Winthrop the Younger	Simon Bradstreet, Daniel Denison	Samuel Mason, Francis Newman	Thomas Southworth, Josiah Winslow
1660	New Haven	Matthew Allyn, John Winthrop the Younger	Simon Bradstreet, Daniel Denison	Samuel Mason, Francis Newman	Thomas Southworth, Josiah WInslow
1661	Plymouth	John Mason, Samuel Willis	Simon Bradstreet, Daniel Denison	William Leete, Benjamin Fenn	Thomas Prence, Thomas Southworth
1662	Boston	John Talcott the younger, Samuel Willis	Simon Bradstreet, Daniel Denison	William Leete, Benjamin Fenn	Thomas Prence, Josiah Winslow
1663	Boston	John Talcott the younger, John Winthrop the Younger	Simon Bradstreet, Thomas Danforth	William Leete, Benjamin Fenn	Thomas Prence, Josiah Winslow
1664	Hartford	Matthew Allyn, Samuel Willis	Simon Bradstreet, Thomas Danforth	Edward Jones	Thomas Southworth, Josiah Winslow
1665	No meeting	New Haven Colony absorbed into the Connecticut Colony			
1666	No meeting				
1667	Hartford	Edward Leete, Samuel Willis	Thomas Danforth, John Leverett	–	Thomas Southworth
1668	N/A	Edward Leete, Samuel Willis, John Winthrop the Younger	Thomas Danforth, John Leverett	–	Thomas Prence, Thomas Southworth, Josiah Winslow
1669	N/A	James Richards, John Talcott the younger, John Winthrop the Younger	Simon Bradstreet, Thomas Danforth, William Hathorne, John Leverett	–	Thomas Prence, Thomas Southworth, Josiah Winslow
1670	N/A	James Richards, John Talcott the younger, Samuel Willis	Simon Bradstreet, Thomas Danforth, William Hathorne, John Leverett	–	Thomas Prence, Josiah Winslow
1671	N/A	James Richards, John Talcott the younger, Samuel Willis	Simon Bradstreet, Thomas Danforth, Daniel Dension, William Hathorne	–	Thomas Prence, Josiah WInslow
1672	Plymouth	Edward Leete, James Richards, John Talcott the younger, Wait-Still Winthrop	Simon Bradstreet, Thomas Danforth, William Hathorne, John Leverett	–	Thomas Hinckley, Thomas Prence, Josiah WInslow
1673	Hartford	John Allyn, Edward Leete, John Talcott the younger	Thomas Danforth, Daniel Denison, William Hathorne. William Stoughton	–	William Bradford the younger, Thomas Hinckley, Josiah Winslow
1674	N/A	John Allynm, James Richards, John Talcott the younger	Simon Bradstreet, Thomas Danforth, Daniel Denison, William Stoughton	–	William Bradford the younger, Thomas Hinckley, Josiah Winslow
1675	Boston	John Allyn, James Richards, John Talcott the younger, John Winthrop the younger, Wait-Still Winthrop	Simon Bradstreet, Thomas Danforth, Daniel Denison, William Stoughton	–	William Bradford the younger, Thomas Hinckley, Josiah Winslow
1676	Boston	John Allyn, James Richards, John Talcott the younger, Wait-Still Winthrop	Thomas Danforth, William Stoughton	–	William Bradford the younger, Thomas Hinckley, Josiah Winslow
1677	N/A	John Allyn, James Richards, John Talcott the younger	Simon Bradstreet, Thomas Danforth, Joseph Dudley, William Stoughton	–	William Bradford the younger, Thomas Hinckley, Josiah Winslow
1678	Hartford	John Allyn, Edward Leete	Thomas Danforth, Joseph Dudley	–	William Bradford the younger, James Cudworth, Thomas Hinckley, Josiah Winslow
1679	Boston	John Allyn, James Richards	Thomas Danforth, Humphrey Davy, Daniel Denison, Joseph Dudley	–	James Cudworth, Thomas Hinckley, Josiah Winslow
1680	N/A	John Allyn, James Richards	Joseph Dudley, William Stoughton	–	William Bradford the younger, Thomas Hinckley, Josiah Winslow
1681	Boston	John Allyn, Robert Treat	Joseph Dudley, William Stoughton	–	William Bradford the younger, James Cudworth, Thomas Hinckley
1682	N/A	John Allyn, Robert Treat	Peter Bulkeley, Elisha Cooke, Samuel Nowell, William Stoughton	–	William Bradford the younger, Thomas Hinckley, Daniel Smith
1683	N/A	John Allyn, John Talcott the younger	Peter Bulkeley, Elisha Cooke, Samuel Nowell, William Stoughton	–	William Bradford the younger, Thomas Hinckley, Daniel Smith
1684	Hartford	John Allyn, John Talcott the younger	Peter Bulkeley, Elisha Cooke, Samuel Nowell, William Stoughton	–	William Bradford the younger, Daniel Smith, John Walley
1685	N/A	N/A	Samuel Nowell, William Stoughton	–	John Walley
1686	N/A	John Allyn, John Mason, William Pitkin, John Talcott the younger	Samuel Nowell, William Stoughton	–	William Bradford the younger, John Walley, Thomas Hinckley
1687	The New England Colonies had their charters revoked. New England was then governed by the Dominion of New England, a direct rule government				
1688	Dominion of New England / Due to the Glorious Revolution and Boston Revolt the Dominion of New England was dissolved and colonial charters were restored				
1689	Boston	William Pitkin	Elisha Cooke, Thomas Danforth	William Vaughn	John Walley, Thomas Hinckley
† Whiting was elected but died before the session could take place "N/A" refers to where information is not known. Although it was customary to have a colony send two commissioners to sessions, many colonies sent alternate or replacement Commissioners which is the reason for some entries to have multiple names.

== See also ==
- Dominion of New England (1686–1689), an entirely different entity
- Hanseatic League
- History of New England
- New England Colonies
- Old Swiss Confederacy
- United Provinces of the Netherlands

== Sources ==
- Quincy Adams, John, ed. (1843). The New England Confederacy A Discourse delivered before the Massachusetts Historical Society, at Boston, on the 29th of May 1843; In Celebration of the Second Centennial of that Event. Charles C. Little and James Brown.
- Ward, Harry (ed.). The United Colonies of New England-1643-90. Vantage Press=1961.
