= Governor Hopkins =

Governor Hopkins may refer to:

- Stephen Hopkins (politician) (1707–1785), 28th, 30th, 32nd, and 34th Governor of the Colony of Rhode Island and Providence Plantations between 1755 and 1768
- Edward Hopkins (1600–1657), Governor of the Connecticut Colony from 1640 to 1655
