= Winthrop Mill =

- U.S. National Register of Historic Places
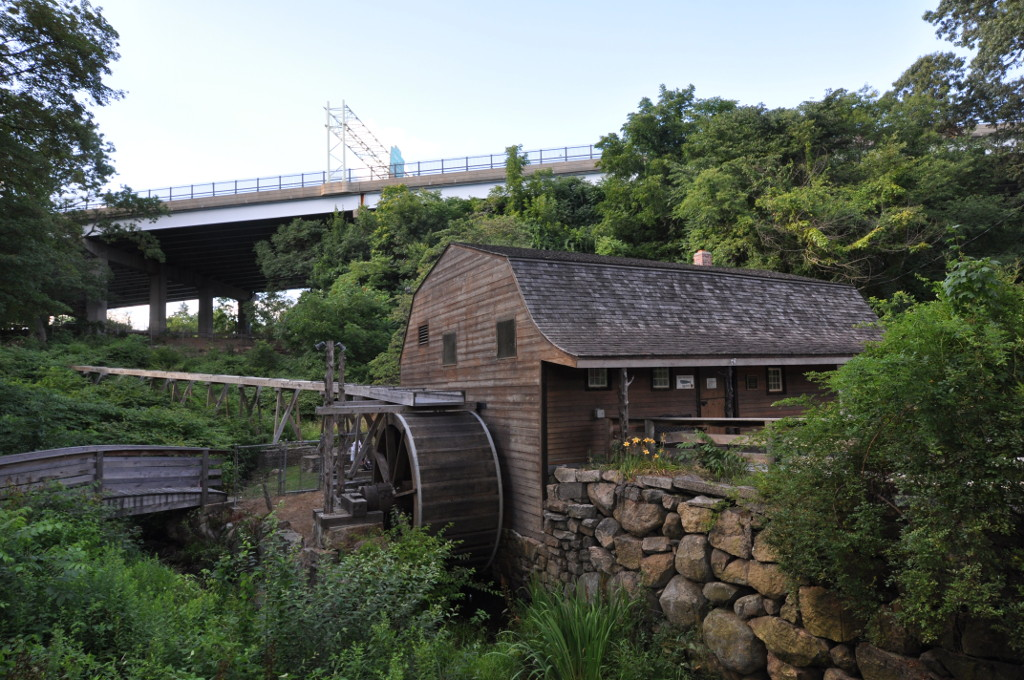

- Location within Connecticut Location within the United States
- Location: Mill Street, New London, Connecticut
- Coordinates: 41°21′47″N 72°6′0″W
- Area: 4 acres (1.6 ha)
- Built: 1650
- NRHP reference No.: 82001008
- Added to NRHP: November 30, 1982

The Winthrop Mill (also known as the Old Town Mill or "Comstock Mill") is a historic mill building on Mill Street in New London, Connecticut. It is a grist mill located astride Briggs Brook between bridges carrying the eastbound and westbound lanes of Interstate 95. The mill was established in 1650, and the complex retains elements that are believed to be original to its construction. It is now owned by the city and the grounds are open daily; the mill itself is open for tours by special appointment. The property was added to the National Register of Historic Places on November 30, 1982.

== History ==
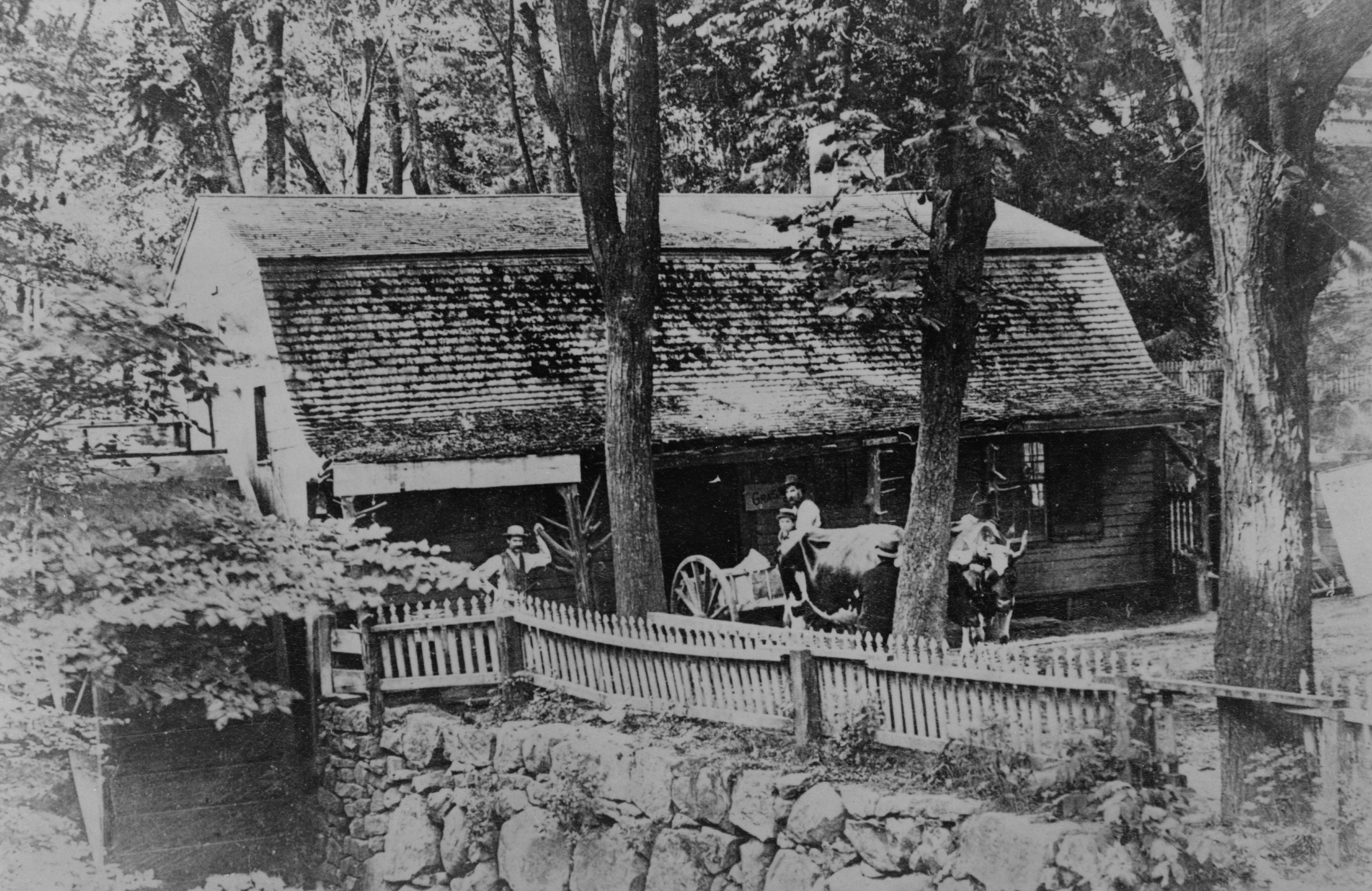
The mill in use, 1894

The first mill was supposedly established on this site in 1650 by Governor John Winthrop, Jr. and William Comstock. The property remained in Winthrop family hands until the late 18th century. Some elements of the mill infrastructure may be very nearly original to the period of first use, notably the elevated flume, wheel pit, and tail race.

The present building may also include elements of the original, although it is known that the mill was set afire during Benedict Arnold's 1781 raid on New London and Groton. The property went through a succession of owners until 1892, when it was acquired by the city. It was leased for commercial operation until 1913, and underwent a major rehabilitation in 1960.

== Current location and description ==
The Winthrop Mill is located north of downtown New London, on Mill Street, a short road between State Pier Road and Winthrop Street. The site is located on Briggs Brook, and is overshadowed by the high bridges carrying I-95 overhead. The mill building is a 1-1/2 story gambrel-roofed wood frame structure, measuring about 30 by 60 feet (9.1 m × 18.3 m). The roof flares out over the front to include a porch, supported by four square posts. The exterior of the building is finished in horizontal boarding that gives rough clapboard-like flushboard finish. Attached to the west wall is the mill's waterwheel.

It is powered by water delivered from an elevated wooden penstock, which receives water from a gate at a small dam on the brook upstream from the mill. The penstock is about 200 feet (61 m) long, and is supported by wooden trestles mounted on stone piers. The interior of the mill contains a mix of modern and old finishes, and retains only a portion of the machinery needed to operate it properly.

== In popular culture ==
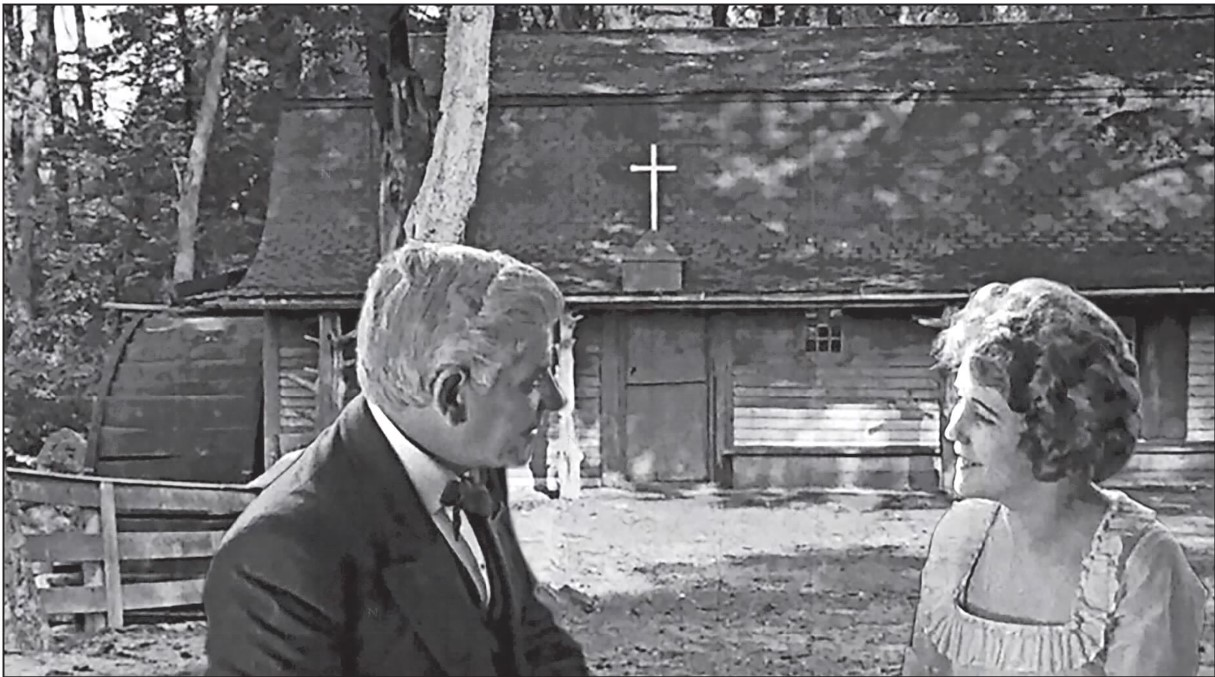
Still from The Church With an Overshot Wheel

The Mill was used as the primary filming location for the 1920 Vitagraph movie of the O. Henry short story The Church With an Overshot Wheel. Part of a 94 film series from O. Henry works of which only two survive which was restored in 2022

== See also ==
- National Register of Historic Places listings in New London County, Connecticut
- List of the oldest buildings in Connecticut
