= Fitz-John Winthrop =

English military officer and colonial administrator (1637–1707)

The Honourable Fitz-John Winthrop
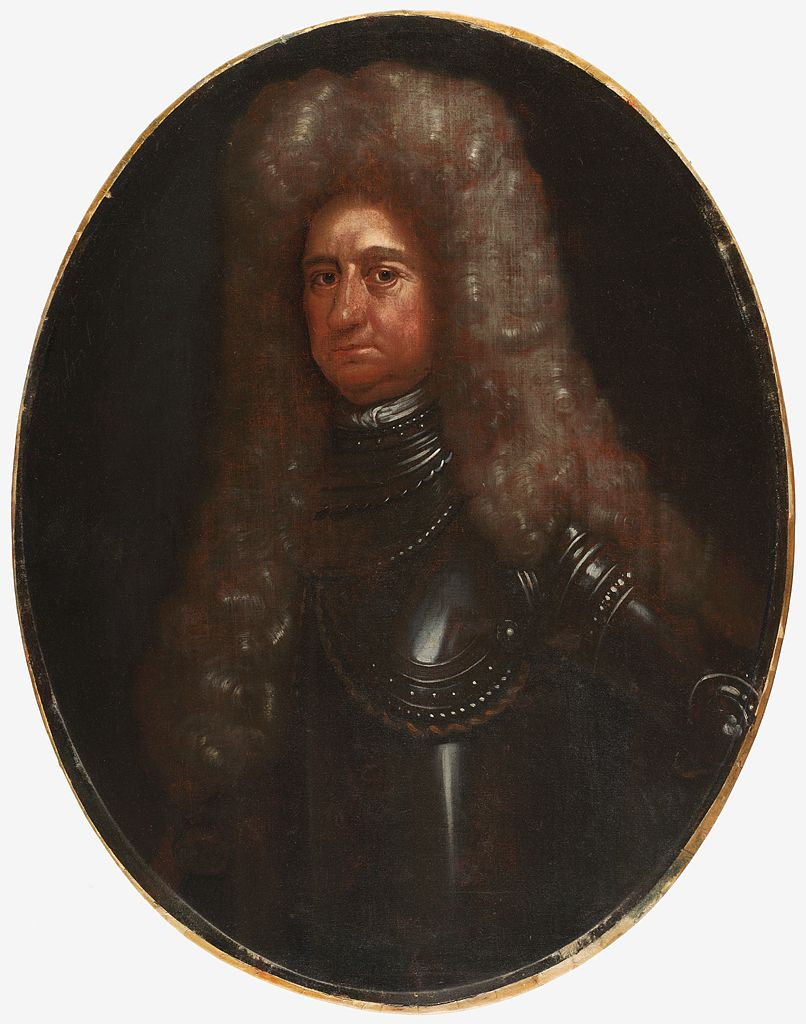
- c. 1694–1697 portrait

Governor of Connecticut
- In office 1698–1707
- Monarchs: William III (1698-1702); Queen Anne (1702-1707)
- Preceded by: Robert Treat
- Succeeded by: Gurdon Saltonstall

Personal details
- Born: March 14, 1637 Boston, Massachusetts
- Died: November 27, 1707 (aged 68) Boston, Massachusetts
- Spouse: Elizabeth Tongue (m. 1677)
- Children: Mary Winthrop
- Parent(s): John Winthrop the Younger and Elizabeth Reade
- Occupation: Military officer, colonial administrator

Major-General Fitz-John Winthrop (March 14, 1639 – November 27, 1707) was an English military officer and colonial administrator who served as the governor of Connecticut from 1698 to 1707, when he died in office.

== Early life ==
Winthrop was born in Ipswich, Massachusetts, the eldest son of John Winthrop the Younger and Elizabeth (Reade) Winthrop. Winthrop was sent to Harvard, but failed the entrance examination.

== Career ==
In 1658, Winthrop went to England. He served in the English New Model Army in Scotland under General George Monck. He accompanied Monck when he marched into England in 1660 at the head of his army and restored King Charles II to the throne. As part of the restoration settlement most of the army was paid off and disbanded.

Winthrop, remained in England and was in London in 1661 when his father presented his petition to obtain a charter for the establishment of a Connecticut colony. In April 1663, both returned to New London.

Winthrop returned to Connecticut and was a representative in 1671. He was a major in King Philip's War, and in July 1675, Winthrop requested Wombe, an Indian gunsmith captured by Ninigret, as a servant. In 1686 Winthrop was one of the council of Governor Andros. He was a Magistrate of Connecticut in 1689, and in 1690 Winthrop was appointed major-general and commanded the unsuccessful expedition of the New York and Connecticut forces against Canada. From 1693 to 1698 he was Agent of the Colony to Great Britain. He was appointed governor of Connecticut in 1696 and held the post until his death in 1707.

== Personal life ==
About 1677, he entered into a common-law marriage with Elizabeth Tongue. Together, the couple had one daughter:

- Mary Winthrop (1683–1713), who married Johannes Livingston (1680–1720), son of Robert Livingston the Elder.

Winthrop died in Boston, Massachusetts, on November 27, 1707. He is interred at the King's Chapel Burying Ground in Boston, Massachusetts. His funeral service was conducted by Cotton Mather, who called his sermon there Winthropi justa.

== Notes ==
Political offices
Preceded by Robert Treat	Governor of the Connecticut Colony; 1698–1707	Succeeded by Gurdon Saltonstall
