= Thomas Welles =

English colonial politician in North America

1st Treasurer of the Colony of Connecticut
- In office 1639–1641
- Succeeded by: William Whiting

2nd Secretary of the Colony of Connecticut
- In office 1641–1648
- Preceded by: Edward Hopkins
- Succeeded by: John Cullick

Deputy Governor of the Colony of Connecticut
- In office 1654–1655
- In office 1656–1657
- In office 1659–1660

17th Governor of the Colony of Connecticut
- In office 1655–1656
- Preceded by: Edward Hopkins
- Succeeded by: John Webster

20th Governor of the Colony of Connecticut
- In office 1658–1659
- Preceded by: John Winthrop the Younger
- Succeeded by: John Winthrop the Younger

Personal details
- Born: 10 July 1594 Stourton, Whichford, Warwickshire, England
- Died: 14 January 1660 (aged 65) Wethersfield, Connecticut
- Spouse(s): Alice Tomes; Elizabeth Deming Foote
- Children: 6

Thomas Welles (c. 10 July 1594 – 14 January 1660) is the only person in Connecticut's history to hold all four top offices: governor, deputy governor, treasurer, and secretary. He was Commissioner of the United Colonies in 1649. Thomas Welles served a total of nineteen years in various Colony of Connecticut positions.In 1639, he was elected as the first treasurer of the Colony of Connecticut, and from 1640 to 1649 served as the colony's secretary. In this capacity, he transcribed the Fundamental Orders into the official colony records on 14 January 1638, OS, (24 January 1639, NS). He was the magistrate during the first witch trials, the Hartford or Connecticut Witch Trials.

== Biography ==
Coat of Arms of Thomas Welles

Welles was born in Tiddington, Warwickshire, England around 1590, the son of Robert Welles and Alice Hunt of Stourton, Whichford, County Warwick, England, born about 1543. He married Alice Tomes on 28 September 1615 at St. Peter's Church, near Banbury, Oxfordshire, England. She was born around 1593 in Long Marston, Gloucestershire, England, the daughter of John Tomes and Ellen (Gunne) Phelps. A brother of Alice Tomes, named John Tomes like his father, was a faithful royalist. During the escape of Charles II, Tomes sheltered him in his home on the night of 10 September 1651 when the king was a fugitive after the Battle of Worcester.

== New World ==
Welles came under duress during this period of political and religious unrest. On 3 November 1634 the court of Star-chamber had asked him to answer in full articles against him charging him with holding puritan tenets. His property was confiscated, and he was scheduled to be sentenced on 16 April 1635. Welles evaded punishment by proceeding to New England as secretary to his friend, William Fiennes, First Viscount Saye and Sele, a protector of Nonconformists.

Welles left England with his wife and children, emigrating to the English colonies in North America. After he and Lord Saye and Sele landed at a fort at the mouth of the Connecticut River (which developed as Saybrook), they traveled to Boston, arriving prior to 9 June 1636.

Saye and Sele returned to England, discouraged by the difficulty of colonization. Welles stayed as he was unwilling to face the Star-chamber. He joined a party of emigrants in Newtown (now Cambridge) in Massachusetts, among whom were Thomas Hooker and Samuel Stone.

Thomas Welles was first documented in colonial records as head of household in Newton ("Newe Towne", now Cambridge, Massachusetts). Welles was next documented in Hartford on 28 March 1637, according to Connecticut Colonial Records. He had moved there with Reverend Thomas Hooker.

Welles was chosen a magistrate of the Colony of Connecticut that same year. He held the office for twenty-two years until his death in 1660, a period of twenty-two years.

In Connecticut, his wife Alice died. Welles remarried in 1646, to Elizabeth (Deming) Foote. She was the widow of Nathaniel Foote (who founded Wethersfield). She was a sister to John Deming. Elizabeth had seven children by her previous marriage. She and Welles did not have any children together.

Welles was elected deputy governor in 1654, and as governor of the Connecticut Colony in 1655. In 1656 and 1657 he served as deputy governor to John Winthrop the Younger; in 1658 he was elected governor again, and in 1659 as deputy governor. He died in office on 14 January 1660 at Wethersfield, Connecticut.

It is thought that he was buried in Wethersfield, Connecticut. Some sources indicate that his remains were later transferred to the Ancient Burying Ground in Hartford. In either case, his grave is unmarked. His name appears on the Founders of Hartford, Connecticut Monument in Hartford's Ancient Burying Ground.

=== Children ===
Welles's family accompanied him to the colonies. After Alice died, he remarried a widow in 1646. They had no children together.

The children of Thomas and Alice (Tomes) Welles who lived into adulthood were:

- Mary (circa 1618 – 1647)
- Anne (circa 1620 – 1680)
- John (circa 1622 – 7 August 1659), settled in Stratford in 1645, serving as a magistrate and a probate judge there. His son, John, married Mary Hollister, daughter of Lt. John Hollister and Joanna Treat, the daughter of Richard Treat.
- Thomas, Jr. (circa 1625 – 1668) settled in Hartford, Connecticut; his daughter Rebecca married Captain James Judson and settled in Stratford in 1680. James and Rebecca's son David Judson, also a Captain, built the Captain David Judson House. It was located on the same site where his great-grandfather William Judson had built his first house, made of stone, in 1639.
- Samuel (circa 1628 – 15 July 1675), became a Captain and settled in Wethersfield, Connecticut. He married Elizabeth Hollister, daughter of Lt. John Hollister and Joanna Treat, the daughter of Richard Treat. Elizabeth and Samuel Welles had six children. After Elizabeth died in 1659, Samuel married as his second wife Hannah, daughter of George Lamberton of the New Haven Colony. They had no children. His son Samuel married Ruth Rice, daughter of Edmund Rice and his wife, on 20 June 1683. The couple had six children.
- Sarah (circa 1631 – 12 December 1698)

== Descendants of note ==
- Steven C. Swett (1934–present), journalist and publisher, Gerald Loeb Award winner
- Joseph Parrish Thompson (1819–1879), abolitionist, religious leader
- Daniel H. Wells (1814–1891), Justice of the Peace in Nauvoo, Illinois and Lt. General of the Nauvoo Legion, mayor of Salt Lake City, Utah
- Heber M. Wells (1859–1938), first governor of Utah
- Briant H. Wells (1871–1949), Major General of U.S. army
- Annie Wells Cannon (1859–1942), women's suffragist, Utah State Legislator
- Rulon S. Wells (1854–1941), Utah state legislator, religious leader
- Dana Delany (1956–present), actress, producer, healthcare activist
- Gideon Welles (1802–1878), United States Secretary of the Navy under Abraham Lincoln and Andrew Johnson
- C. Bradford Welles (1901-1969) American Classicist and ancient historian

== Notes ==
Political offices
Preceded by Edward Hopkins	Governor of the Connecticut Colony; 1655–1656	Succeeded by John Webster
Preceded by John Winthrop the Younger	Governor of the Connecticut Colony; 1658–1659	Succeeded by John Winthrop the Younger
