= John Winthrop the Younger =

English-born physician, colonial administrator and alchemist (1606–1676)

John Winthrop the Younger FRS
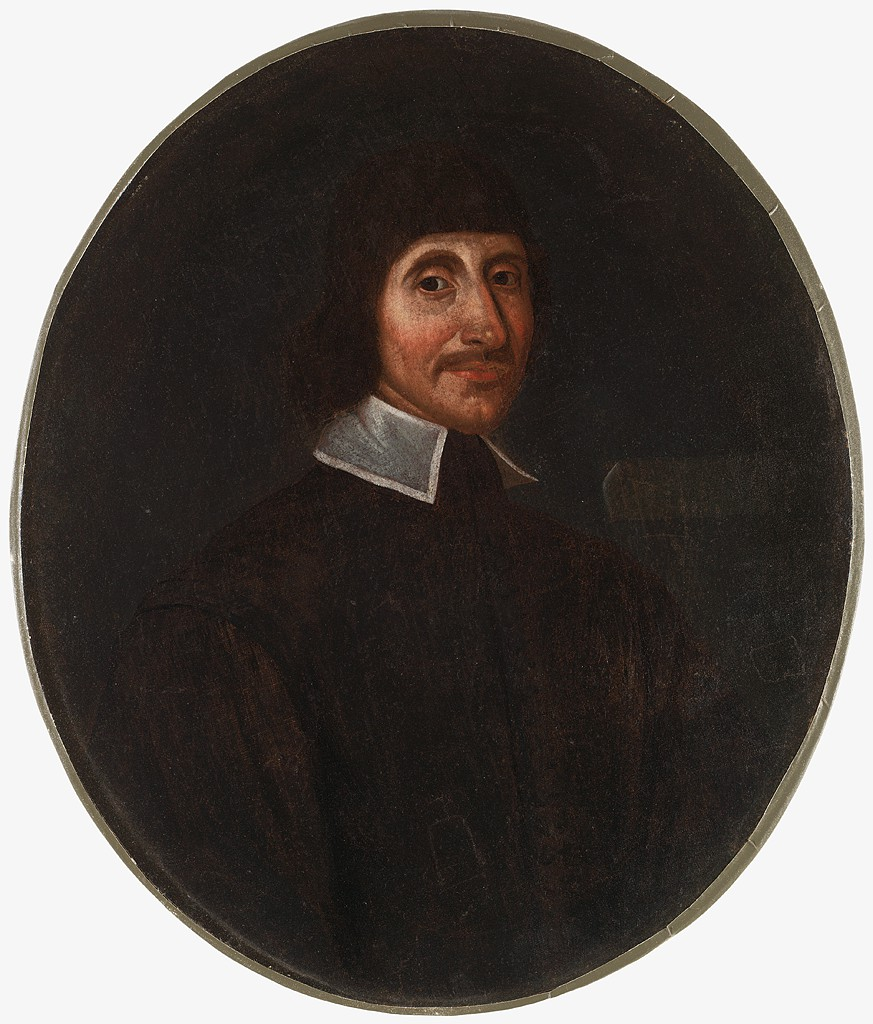
- 17th-century portrait

Governor of the Connecticut Colony
- In office 1659–1676
- Preceded by: Thomas Welles
- Succeeded by: William Leete
- In office 1657–1658
- Preceded by: John Webster
- Succeeded by: Thomas Welles

Governor of the Saybrook Colony
- In office 1635–1639
- Preceded by: Inaugural holder
- Succeeded by: George Fenwick

Commissioner for Connecticut Colony
- In office 1658–1660
- In office 1663–1663
- In office 1668–1669
- In office 1675–1675

Personal details
- Born: February 12, 1606 Groton, Suffolk
- Died: April 6, 1676 (aged 70) Boston, Massachusetts Bay Colony
- Spouses: Mary Fones (m. 1630; died 1634) Elizabeth Reade (died 1672)
- Children: 10
- Parents: John Winthrop; Mary Forth
- Education: Bury St. Edmunds; King Edward VI School
- Alma mater: Trinity College, Dublin
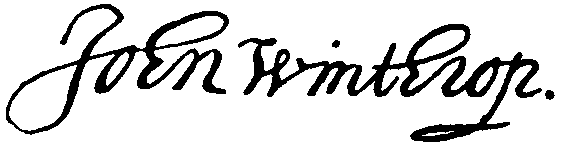
- Signature

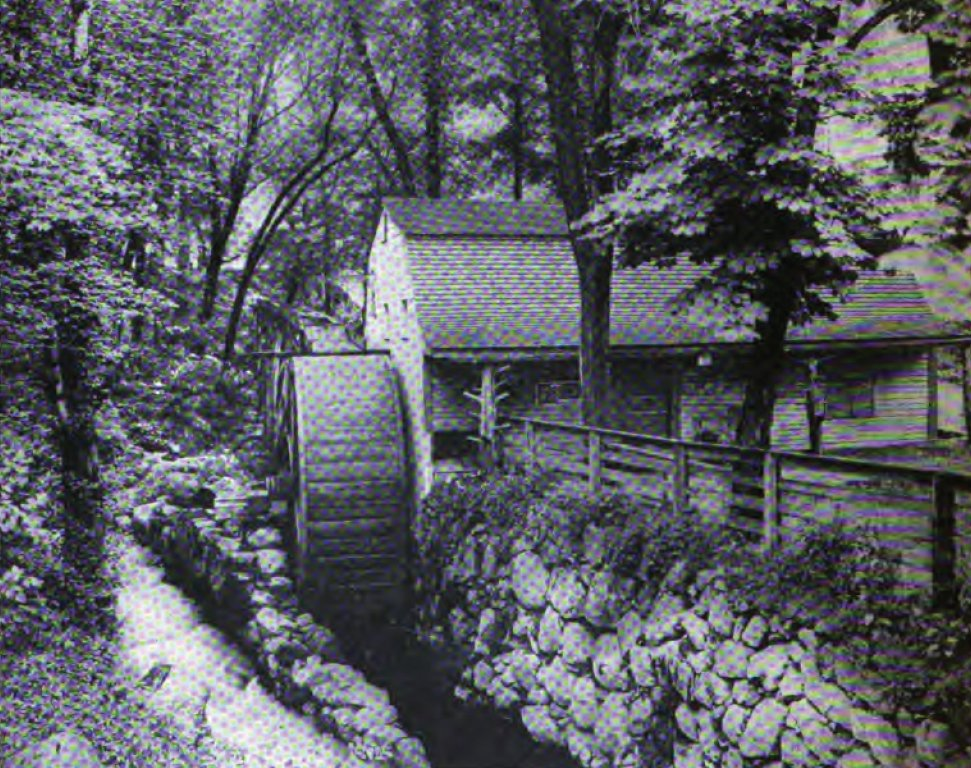
Grist mill (Winthrop Mill) built by Winthrop in New London in 1650 (1910 photo)

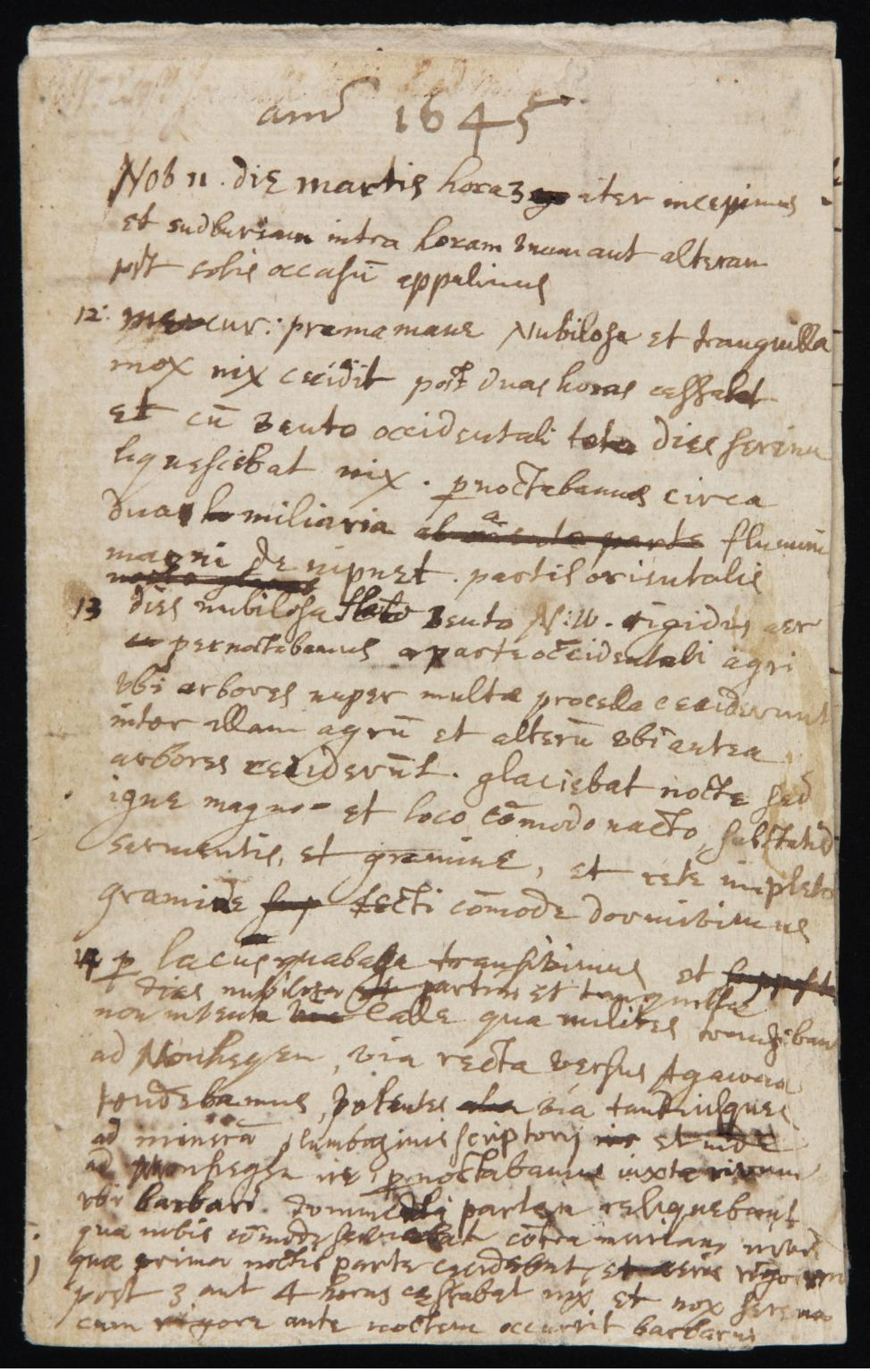
First page of a diary kept by Winthrop of his journey from Boston to Saybrook Colony in 1645

John Winthrop the Younger, FRS (February 12, 1606 – April 6, 1676), was an English-born physician, colonial administrator, and alchemist. He was an early governor of the Connecticut Colony who played a large role in the unification of numerous settlements and obtaining a royal charter for the unified colony.

== Early life and education ==
Winthrop was born in Groton, Suffolk, England, on February 12, 1606, the son of John Winthrop, founding governor of the Massachusetts Bay Colony, by first wife Mary Forth. He was educated at the Bury St. Edmunds grammar school, King Edward VI School, and Trinity College, Dublin, and he studied law for a short time after 1624 at the Inner Temple, London.

== Early career ==
Winthrop finished his legal studies in 1627, then accompanied the ill-fated expedition of the Duke of Buckingham for the relief of the Protestants of La Rochelle in France. He then traveled to Italy, the Ottoman Empire, and the Netherlands, returning to England in 1629. In 1631, he followed his father to Massachusetts Bay Colony and was one of the assistants of the Colony between 1635 and 1649. He was one of the founders of Agawam (now Ipswich, Massachusetts) in 1633, then went to England in 1634. He returned in 1635 as governor of lands that had been granted to Lord Saye and Sele and Lord Brooke, and he sent out a party to build a fort named Saybrook in their honor at the mouth of the Connecticut River. He then lived for a time in Massachusetts, where he devoted himself to the study of alchemy and attempted to interest the settlers in the development of the colony's mineral resources.

He was again in England in 1641–43, then returned to establish iron works at Lynn (Saugus Iron Works) and Braintree, Massachusetts. In 1645, he obtained title to lands in southeastern Connecticut and founded New London in 1646, where he settled in 1650. He built a grist mill in the town and was granted a monopoly on the trade for as long as he or his heirs maintained it. This was one of the first monopolies granted in New England. One of Winthrop's servants was Robin Cassacinamon, who became an influential Pequot leader through Winthrop's patronage.

Winthrop was also a physician, traveling around the Connecticut settlements serving up to 12 patients a day. His success as a physician prompted the New Haven Colony to invite him to move there, with the promise of a free house. Winthrop accepted this offer and moved to New Haven in 1655, largely because he was interested in developing ironworks there.

== Governor of the Connecticut Colony ==
Winthrop became one of the magistrates of Connecticut Colony in 1651, was governor of the colony in 1657–58, and again became governor in 1659, being annually re-elected until his death in 1676. He oversaw the acceptance of Quakers who were banned from Massachusetts during his time as governor. He was also one of the commissioners of the United Colonies of New England in 1675.

=== Securing a Charter ===
The Stuart Monarchy was restored in 1660, and many feared that the colony's lack of legal basis would lead to the new government establishing absolute rule in Connecticut. Winthrop sailed for England in July 1661 to obtain a charter from Charles II, with the assistance of William Fiennes, Robert Greville, and Edward Montagu, which he obtained in May 1662. The charter granted the colony generous rights and officially combined it with the New Haven Colony.

=== Later governorship ===
The Conquest of New Netherland and subsequent Second Anglo-Dutch War caused financial difficulty for both Winthrop and Connecticut Colony. The Dutch harassed English shipping, and Winthrop lost at least one ship's cargo. He attempted to resign his governorship in 1667, but the colony refused his request and lowered his tax burden in an attempt to convince him to stay. He again attempted to resign his office in October 1670, but this request was also refused.

== Scientific contributions ==
Winthrop was an avid scientist who experimented on obtaining salt from sea water. He traveled to England from 1661 to 1663, showing New World plants and animals to Charles II and reading papers for the Royal Society. The King was particularly interested in milkweed, and he wanted to have a pillow made from it before being convinced that it was impractical. Winthrop sent shipments of milkweed to the King after returning to Connecticut. His scientific contribution led to him being elected an original fellow of the Royal Society while on this trip in 1663. Winthrop contributed two papers to the society's Philosophical Transactions: "Some Natural Curiosities from New England" and "Description, Culture and Use of Maize". His correspondence with the Royal Society was published in series I, vol. xvi of the Massachusetts Historical Society's Proceedings. Winthrop returned to Connecticut Colony with America's first telescope, likely a gift from Benjamin Worsley. In 1664 he observed five satellites around Jupiter with a small telescope. The actual fifth moon of Jupiter was not confirmed until 1892; Winthrop had likely seen the star HR 7128 (SAO 187468) which happened to be next to Jupiter on the night of his sole observation. He donated the telescope to Harvard College in 1671, making it the college's first scientific instrument.

== Personal life ==
Winthrop married his cousin Mary Fones on February 8, 1630/1. She and their infant daughter died in Agawam (Ipswich) in 1634.

Winthrop's second wife was Elizabeth Reade (1615–1672), and they had nine children:

- Elizabeth Winthrop (1636–1716), who married Rev. Antipas Newman and Dr. Zerubbabel Endecott, son of Gov. John Endecott
- Fitz-John Winthrop (1638–1707), who served as major-general in the army, a colonial agent in London for Connecticut (1683–1687), and governor of Connecticut from 1696 until his death in 1707
- Lucy Winthrop (1640–1676), who married Maj. Edward Palmes
- Waitstill Winthrop (1642–1717), who married Mary Browne (1656–1690)
- Mary "Mercy" Winthrop (1644–1740), who married the Rev. John Culver III
- Sara Winthrop (1644–1704), who married the Rev. John Culver III
- Margaret Winthrop (c. 1648 – 1711), who married John Corwin
- Martha Winthrop (1648–1712), who married Richard Wharton
- Anne Winthrop (c. 1649 – 1704), who married John Richards (son of accused witch Wealthean (née Loring) Richards)

Winthrop died in Boston on April 6, 1676, where he had gone to attend a meeting of the commissioners of the United Colonies of New England. He is interred in his family's plot in King's Chapel Burying Ground in Boston.

Political offices
| New office | Governor of the Saybrook Colony; 1635–1639 | Succeeded by George Fenwick |
| Preceded by John Webster | Governor of the Connecticut Colony; 1657–1658 | Succeeded by Thomas Welles |
| Preceded by Thomas Welles | Governor of the Connecticut Colony; 1659–1676 | Succeeded by William Leete |
