= Connecticut Colony =

British colony in North America (1636–1776)

Coordinates: 41.71803°N 72.75146°W

- 1636–1776
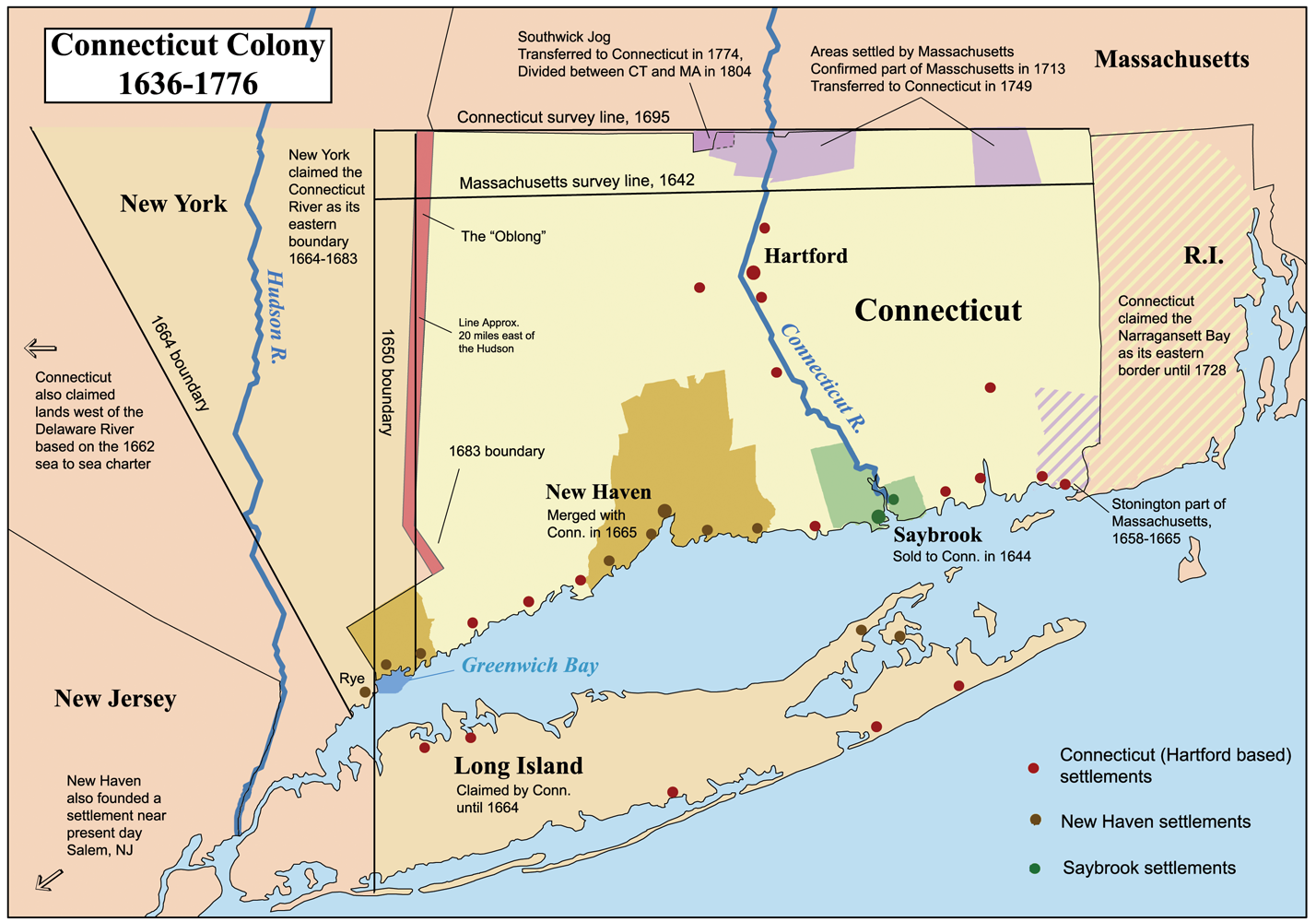
- Map of the Connecticut, New Haven, and Saybrook colonies
- Status: Colony of England (1636–1707); Colony of Great Britain (1707–1776)
- Capital: Hartford (1636–1776); New Haven (joint capital with Hartford, 1701–76)
- Common languages: English, Mohegan-Pequot, and Quiripi
- Religion: Congregationalism (official)
- Government: Self-governing colony
- Governor
  - 1639-1640: John Haynes (first)
  - 1769-1776: Jonathan Trumbull (last)
- Legislature: General Court
- History
  - Established: March 3, 1636
  - Fundamental Orders of Connecticut adopted: January 14, 1639
  - Royal Charter granted: October 9, 1662
  - Part of the Dominion of New England: 1686-89
  - Independence: July 4, 1776
- Currency: Connecticut pound
Preceded by	Succeeded by
Saybrook Colony; New Haven Colony	Connecticut
- Today part of: United States ∟Connecticut

The Connecticut Colony, originally known as the Connecticut River Colony, was an English colony in New England which became the state of Connecticut. It was organized on March 3, 1636 as a settlement for a Puritan congregation of settlers from the Massachusetts Bay Colony led by Thomas Hooker. The English secured their control of the region in the Pequot War. The colony eventually absorbed the neighboring New Haven and Saybrook colonies. It was part of the brief Dominion of New England. The colony's founding document was the Fundamental Orders of Connecticut, which has been called the first written constitution of a democratic government, earning Connecticut the nickname "The Constitution State".

== History ==
Prior to European settlement, the land that would become Connecticut was home to the Wappinger Confederacy along the western coast and the Niantics on the eastern coast. Further inland were the Pequot, who pushed the Niantic to the coast and would become the most important tribe in relations with colonists. Also present were the Nipmucs and Mohicans, though these two tribes largely lived in the neighboring states of Massachusetts and New York respectively. The first European to visit Connecticut was Dutch explorer Adriaen Block, who sailed up the Connecticut River with his yacht Onrust. Accordingly, as the first Europeans to explore Connecticut, the Dutch claimed the land as part of New Netherland and negotiated a land purchase of 20 acres along the river from Wopigwooit, the Grand Sachem of the Pequot in 1633. The Dutch would establish a trading post named Kivett's Point and a redoubt named Fort Good Hope, the future sites of Saybrook and Hartford respectively.

=== English settlement ===
In 1631, a group of sachems from the Connecticut valley led by Wahquimacut visited Plymouth Colony and Boston, asking both colonies to send settlers to Connecticut to fight the Pequot. Massachusetts governor John Winthrop rejected the proposal but Edward Winslow, governor of Plymouth was more open, traveling to Connecticut in person in 1632. Winslow, along with William Bradford would later travel to Boston to convince the leaders of Massachusetts Bay to join Plymouth in constructing a trading post on the Connecticut River before the Dutch could. Winthrop rejected the offer, calling Connecticut "not fit to meddle with" citing hostile Indians and the difficulty of moving large ships into the Connecticut River.

Despite the Bay Colony's refusal to join the venture, Plymouth sent a bark led by William Holmes to establish a trading post on the Connecticut. Besides the English settlers, they took some of the original sachems of the area to prove the validity of their claim. As they passed Fort Good Hope they were threatened by the Dutch, a threat ignored by Holmes. Holmes proceeded a few miles up river and constructed a trading post on the modern site of Windsor. Hearing of the English activities, New Netherland governor Wouter Van Twiller dispatched 70 men to dislodge the English. The Dutch would find the English well prepared to defend themselves and left, seeking to avoid bloodshed. Meanwhile, John Oldham led a group of men from the Bay Colony to the river to see Connecticut for themselves. They returned with accounts of plentiful beaver, hemp, and graphite. A year later, Oldham would lead a group of settlers to found the town of Wethersfield.

By 1635, Massachusetts' English population had grown immensely and it was clear there was not enough land for the settlers. Particularly eager to leave the crowded Bay colony were the residents of Newtown. The founder of Newtown, Thomas Dudley was frequently at odds with Winthrop, including anger at the choice of Boston as the colony's capital and refusal to support the construction of a fort in Boston. Dudley sent one Thomas Hooker, Newtown's pastor to Boston to resolve the latter dispute, but the resentment of Winthrop remained. After Dudley replaced Winthrop as governor in May 1634, the issue of Hooker's congregation's desire for removal to Connecticut was raised in the General Court. Opponents of the removal feared the impact of a large exodus of Massachusetts population and that the geographic division would foster disunity. A charismatic preacher like Hooker was also likely to draw future settlers from Massachusetts as well. Ultimately the General Court swayed the Newtowners with a grant of land within Massachusetts. This proved unsatisfactory, but removal was nonetheless delayed for two years.

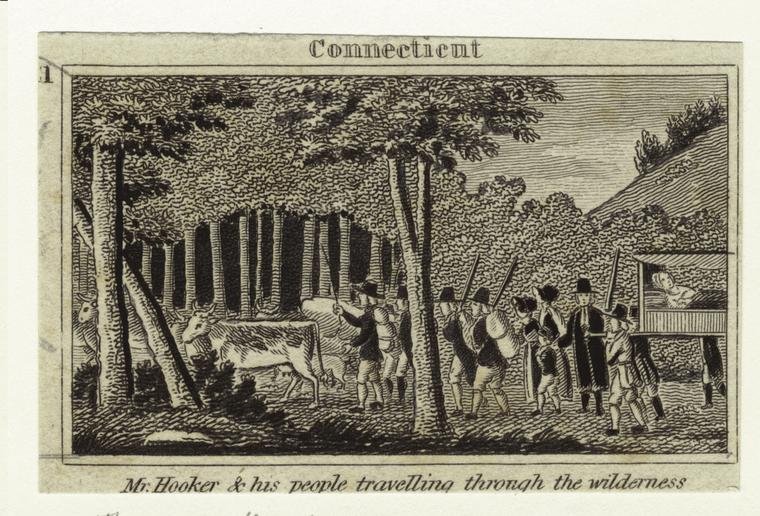
Thomas Hooker and his people traveling

Despite the refusal of Hooker's request for removal, settlers continued to pour into the valley. In May 1635 the Saybrook Colony was established at the mouth of the Connecticut River. Considerable amounts of emigrants from Massachusetts also settled in the recently established town of Wethersfield. Plymouth's settlement of Windsor also found itself swamped by settlers from Dorchester who took over the settlement. The issue was resolved when the Dorchester settlers agreed to pay the Plymouth settlers for the land appropriated. Finally in 1636 the arrival of a new group of settlers allowed Hooker's congregation to sell their homes and set off on the journey to Connecticut on the May 31.

Hooker's group of around a hundred settlers and as many cattle soon arrived at the Connecticut River and established the town of Newtown near the Dutch fort. This name would not last however, as it was soon renamed Hartford after Hertford, the hometown of settler Samuel Stone. In May 1638 Thomas Hooker delivered a sermon on civil government. Inspired by this sermon the settlers sought to create a constitution for the colony. The resulting document, the Fundamental Orders of Connecticut, was likely mostly drafted by Roger Ludlow, the only trained lawyer in the colonies. The document was adopted in January 1639 and formally united the settlements of Hartford, Windsor, and Wetherfield together and has been called the first written democratic constitution. Under the new constitution, John Haynes was elected governor with Ludlow as deputy governor. Owing to a restriction against governors seeking office in consecutive years, Haynes would alternate the office of governor with Edward Hopkins every year until 1655. Shortly after the Fundamental Orders were established, the nearby New Haven colony organized its own government.

=== Pequot War ===
When Fort Good Hope was constructed, the Dutch specified in their treaty with the Pequot that the trading post was to be open to all tribes. Ignoring this, the Pequot attacked a rival tribe attempting to trade. The Dutch retaliated by kidnapping the sachem of the Pequot, Tatobem, and holding him for ransom. After the Pequot paid the ransom, the Dutch gave them Tatobem's corpse. The Pequot retaliated for this by attacking an English ship, believing it to be Dutch. The ship's captain, John Stone, and his crew were killed by the Pequot. A Pequot envoy was sent to Massachusetts to explain the misunderstanding. The envoy told the English about the mistaken identity of the ship. When asked to turn over the killers, the envoy claimed all but two of the killers had died of a recent smallpox epidemic and they lacked the authority to turn over the two survivors. The Pequot further claimed the killing was justified as Stone had captured two Pequots and mistreated them. When John Gallup was sailing to Long Island he spotted a pinnace belonging to John Oldham, its deck covered with Indians. When Gallup attempted to board the ship to investigate, a fight ensued, with Gallup victorious. The colonists blamed the Narragansett for the killing, warning Roger Williams to be careful. The Narragansett leaders Canonicus and Miantonomoh were able to reassure the colonist, claiming that the culprits not killed by Gallup were hiding among the Pequot.

After this, a group of ninety men led by John Endecott and his captains John Underhill and Nathaniel Turner was sent from Massachusetts to the Pequot's territory to demand the return of the murderers of both Stone and Oldham. The force first sailed to Block Island, but the Indians evaded them there, and the force left with the only casualty inflicted on the villagers being the burning of the island's empty villages. When the forces arrived in Pequot territory, they were told that the murder was committed by none other than Sassacus, grand sachem of the Pequot. The Pequot also claimed to be unable to distinguish the Dutch from the English. Disbelieving these claims and seeing there were no women or children among the Pequot, Endecott attacked, beginning the war. The Pequot responded by besieging Saybrook and attacking Wethersfield, where they would kill nine and take two women hostage. The women were daughters of William Swaine and would later be rescued by the Dutch.

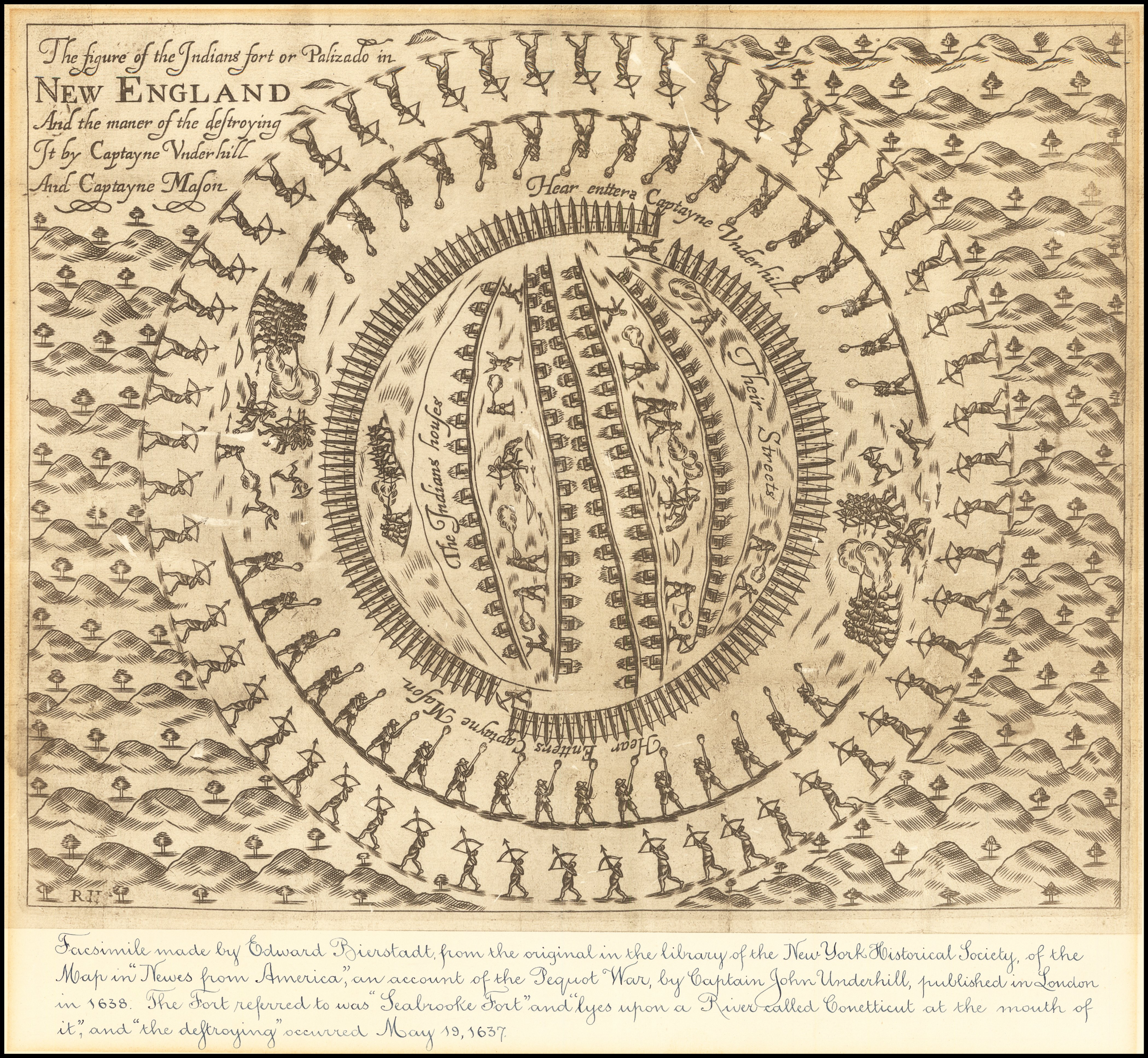
c. 1870 engraving of the Mystic massacre after a 1638 original

Connecticut sent a force of 90 men led by John Mason. The force was joined by sixty Mohegans led by Uncas and came to Saybrook, where a group of Massachusetts colonists led by Underhill joined them. On May 26, 1637, the group, encamped outside a fortified Pequot village on the Mystic River, launched a surprise attack at dawn. The colonists charged into the village, set it on fire, and formed a ring around the stockades to kill anyone attempting to escape. Their Mohegan allies formed a second ring to catch anyone who managed to escape the first. Hundreds of Pequots died, many of them women and children.

Their spirits broken, many of the Pequot attempted to flee west. Mason, accompanied by Israel Stoughton pursued a group of three hundred Pequots to a swamp near modern Fairfield, where they killed and captured a great number of them. Sassacus was able to escape to the Mohawks, who immediately killed him and his party, sending his scalp to Boston. With the Pequots vanquished the Treaty of Hartford was signed between Connecticut, the Mohegans, and the Narragansett, granting the Connecticut settlers the exclusive right to the former Pequot land and dissolving the Pequot as both a political and cultural entity, with surviving Pequots made to assimilate into the other tribes.

=== Consolidating the colony ===
The Pequot War had made clear the difference in needs between Connecticut and Massachusetts. During the conflict, Connecticut favored a more cautious policy than Massachusetts. Lion Gardiner, commander of Saybrook Fort noted that Connecticut would face the brunt of the damages of the conflict while Massachusetts was safe in the Bay. Connecticut asserted its status as a separate colony when at the conclusion of the war it renounced all treaties between the Narragansett and Massachusetts and began conducting Indian diplomacy on its own terms.

With the outbreak of the English Civil War, English support for the Saybrook Colony dried up. The colony's governor, George Fenwick negotiated a deal to sell the colony to Connecticut in 1644. Fenwick returned to England and served with distinction under Oliver Cromwell. Inspired by the successes of colonial cooperation during the Pequot War, Connecticut, Massachusetts, Plymouth, and New Haven formed the New England Confederation to mutually defend the colonies against the Dutch, French, and Indians. Before leaving for England, Fenwick, along with Hopkins, served as Connecticut's first commissioners to the Confederation. Connecticut's membership in the Confederation also meant it sent troops to fight in King Philip's War, though Connecticut itself was minimally impacted.

Like its fellow Puritan colonies, Connecticut welcomed Cromwell's victory in the civil war. Its ministers regularly preached Roundhead ideas. The new English government, however, soon caused issues for Connecticut. The Confederation negotiated the Treaty of Hartford defining the border between New Netherland and the English colonies, but the government in England refused to ratify it. Tensions with the Dutch were inflamed by the Navigation Act 1651, restricting foreign trade with the colonies. These tensions culminated in the First Anglo-Dutch War. The war's outbreak enabled Connecticut to seize Fort Good Hope in 1653.

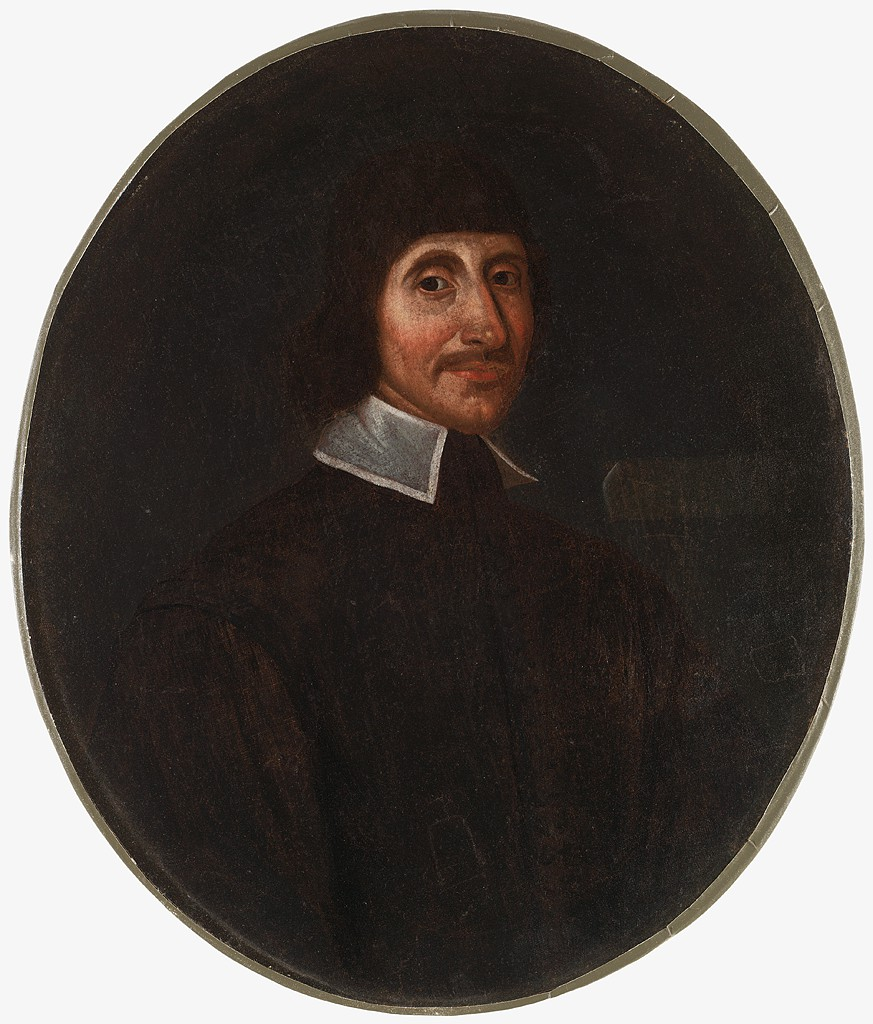
John Winthrop the Younger

After the Stuart Restoration in 1660, many in Connecticut feared their colony's Puritanism and lack of a royal charter would lead to Charles II curtailing the colony's self-government. Governor John Winthrop the Younger was sent to England in 1662 where he successfully obtained a charter. The charter was quite egalitarian, with Connecticut being one of two colonies to have freemen elect both the governor and members of the legislature. (Note: The other was Rhode Island.) The charter also granted Connecticut extensive land claims, defining its borders as the Narragansett Bay, the Pacific Ocean, the southern border of Massachusetts and the 40th parallel north. The claims of Narragansett Bay as the eastern border brought Connecticut into conflict with Rhode Island, Massachusetts Bay, and Plymouth Colony.

Connecticut, Massachusetts, and Plymouth all claimed Narragansett country as spoils of the Pequot War. The Royal Commission of 1664 brought the territory under direct crown rule during the litigation and named it the King's Province.

In 1683, Edward Cranfield awarded the King's Province to Connecticut. In 1720, Connecticut and Rhode Island agreed the land should belong to Rhode Island.

When representatives of Connecticut traveled to New Haven to show them that they were to be annexed into Connecticut, they initially met strong opposition. This opposition faded in 1664 when New Netherland was seized and renamed New York after its proprietor, the Roman Catholic Duke of York. The Royal Commission of 1664 settled New York's eastern boundary which was defined as the Connecticut River, putting New Haven within the claims of both New York and Connecticut. Unwilling to be ruled by a Catholic royalist, New Haven relented and agreed to join Connecticut. The aforementioned seizure of New Netherland also ended Connecticut's claims on Long Island, as when Captain John Scott took the island he claimed it not for Connecticut but for himself.

=== Dominion of New England ===
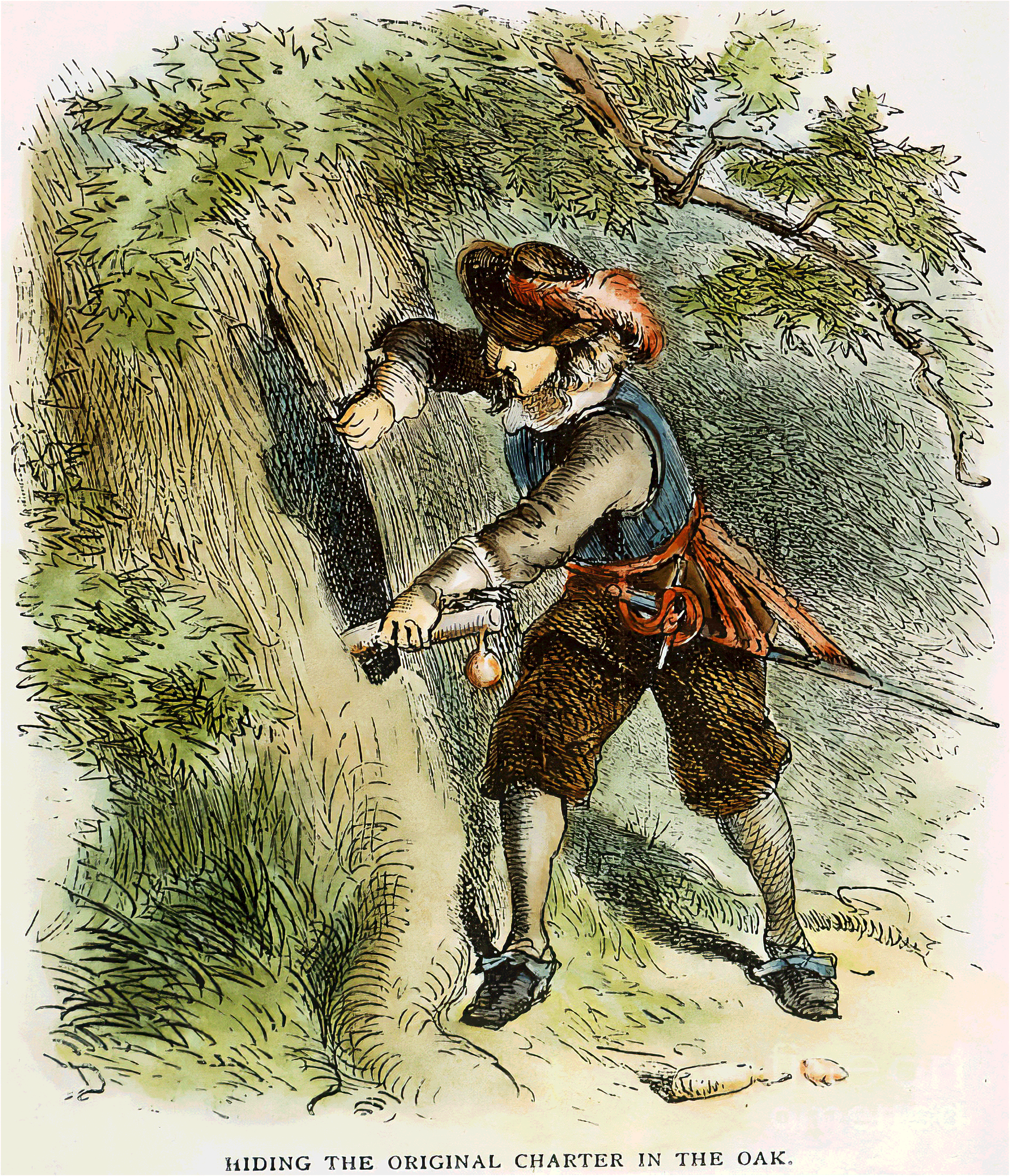
Hiding the charter in the oak

The Duke of York would ascend to the throne as King James II and VII. As one of his first acts, he would consolidate the English colonies from West Jersey to Maine into the Dominion of New England. Sir Edmund Andros would be appointed governor of the new united colony. Andros demanded that Connecticut hand over its charter as it was no longer a separate colony. Governor Robert Treat attempted to delay handing over the charter for several months, but on October 31, 1687, Andros came to Hartford to retrieve the charter in person. Treat proceeded to give a speech well into the evening on the importance of the charter. Suddenly, a strong gust of wind came through the door, blowing out the candles. By the time the candles were relit, the charter had vanished, safely hidden away in a nearby oak tree by one Joseph Wadsworth. The tree, which became known as the Charter Oak would endure as a symbol of Connecticut for generations. Andros replaced Puritan officials with Anglicans and imposed heavy taxes. His salary of £1,200 exceeded the entire annual expenditure of Massachusetts' former government. When James II was overthrown in the Glorious Revolution, Andros initially attempted to suppress the news. Word did get out, and the colonists overthrew the dominion casting its government as crypto-Catholic supports of James II and themselves as loyal to the new Protestant monarchs of William III and Mary II. The dominion's short-lived experiment in centralized government ended and Connecticut, along with all the other colonies, had its charter restored.

=== Later history ===
In 1701, New Haven was designated co-capital with Hartford. At the first legislative session in New Haven to create a college for the colony, with Saybrook as the site and Abraham Pierson as the first rector. Pierson would run the college from his home in Killingworth until his death in 1707, when it was finally moved to Saybrook. Saybrook would soon prove to be too remote and New Haven was able to beat out other communities for the site of the college in 1716. Two years later, when Elihu Yale made a significant donation to the college, it was renamed Yale College in his honor.

Connecticut played a key role in the First Great Awakening. On July 8, 1741, Connecticut-born Jonathan Edwards famously delivered his sermon "Sinners in the Hands of an Angry God" in Enfield in what Ola Elizabeth Winslow termed "the height of revival excitement." The revivals also divided the colony between Old and New Lights with Old Lights being skeptical of the revival and New Lights in support of it. This religious division developed into a political division, with the two groups feuding over a law against itinerant preachers passed by Old Light politicians.

The Connecticut Courant, the oldest continuously published newspaper in the United States, was founded in Hartford in 1764.

Connecticut's population was staunchly in support of the American Revolution, with a fifth of the state's male population serving in the war. Jonathan Trumbull was the only colonial governor to support the patriots. Nathan Hale, the first American spy, also hailed from the colony.

== Demographics ==
The colony was largely homogeneous, the vast majority of settlers were of English descent and the colony had only Protestant churches. The original colonies along the Connecticut River and in New Haven were established by separatist Puritans who were connected with the Massachusetts and Plymouth colonies. They held Calvinist religious beliefs similar to the English Puritans, but they maintained that their congregations needed to be separated from the English state church. They had immigrated to New England during the Great Migration. In the middle of the 18th century, the government restricted voting rights with a property qualification and a church membership requirement. Congregationalism was the established church in the colony by the time of the American War of Independence until it was disestablished in 1818.

Historical population
Year	Pop.	±%
1640	1,472	—
1650	4,139	+181.2%
1660	7,980	+92.8%
1670	12,603	+57.9%
1680	17,246	+36.8%
1690	21,645	+25.5%
1700	25,970	+20.0%
1710	39,450	+51.9%
1720	58,830	+49.1%
1730	75,530	+28.4%
1740	89,580	+18.6%
1750	111,280	+24.2%
1760	142,470	+28.0%
1770	183,881	+29.1%
1774	197,842	+7.6%
1780	206,701	+4.5%
Source: 1640–1760; 1774 includes New Haven Colony (1638–1664) 1770–1780

== Economic and social history ==
The economy began with subsistence farming in the 17th century and developed with greater diversity and an increased focus on production for distant markets, especially the British colonies in the Caribbean. The American Revolution cut off imports from Britain and stimulated a manufacturing sector that made heavy use of the entrepreneurship and mechanical skills of the people. In the second half of the 18th century, difficulties arose from the shortage of good farmland, periodic money problems, and downward price pressures in the export market. In agriculture, there was a shift from grain to animal products. The colonial government attempted to promote various commodities as export items from time to time, such as hemp, potash, and lumber, in order to bolster its economy and improve its balance of trade with Great Britain.

Connecticut's domestic architecture included a wide variety of house forms. They generally reflected the dominant English heritage and architectural tradition.

== See also ==
- List of colonial governors of Connecticut
- History of the Connecticut Constitution
- Connecticut Western Reserve
- History of Springfield, Massachusetts
