= Saybrook Colony =

English colony in North America (1635–1644)

Coordinates: 41°17′03″N 72°21′08″W

- 1635–1644
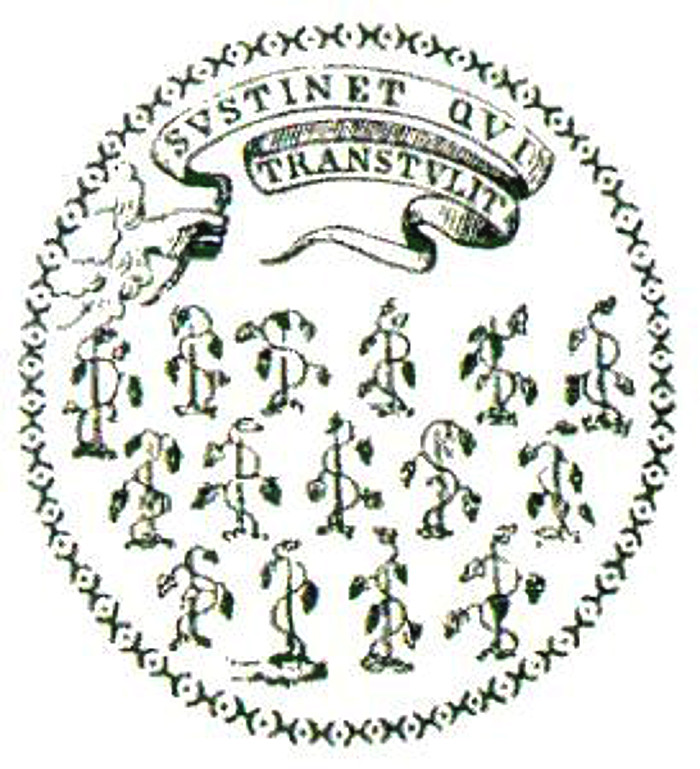
- Seal

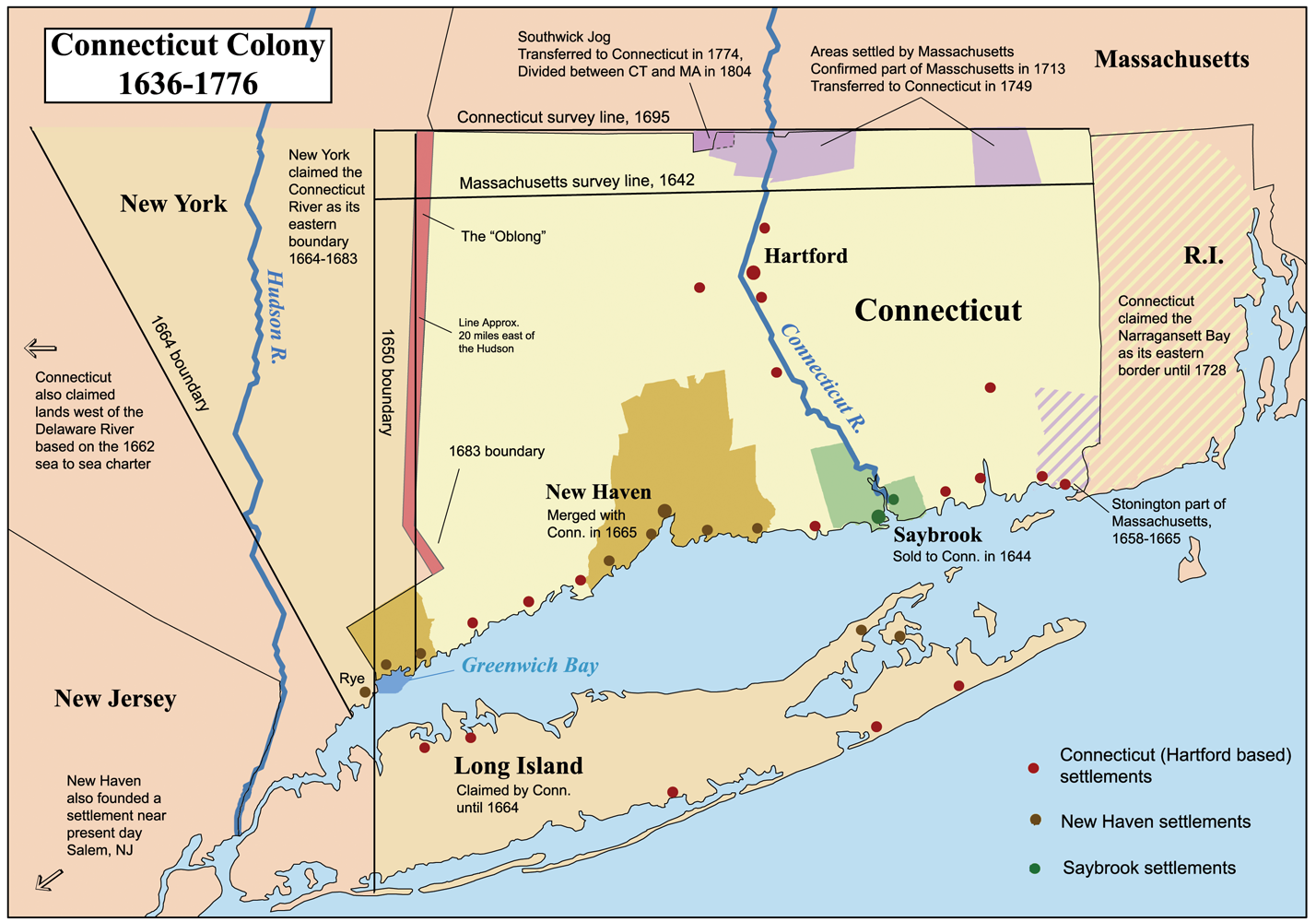
- Map of Connecticut annotated to show its colonial history and the establishment of its modern borders
- Status: Self-governing colony of England
- Capital: Saybrook
- Common languages: English
- Religion: Puritanism
- Governor
  - 1635-1637: John Winthrop the Younger
  - 1637-1639: Lion Gardiner (de facto)
  - 1639-1644: George Fenwick
- History
  - Established: 1635
  - Merged with Connecticut Colony: 1644
- Currency: Pound sterling
Succeeded by
Connecticut Colony

The Saybrook Colony was a short-lived English colony established in New England in 1635 at the mouth of the Connecticut River in Old Saybrook, Connecticut. Saybrook was founded by a group of Puritan noblemen as a potential political refuge from the personal rule of Charles I. They claimed possession of the land via a deed of conveyance from Robert Rich, 2nd Earl of Warwick, which granted the colony the land from the Narragansett Bay to the Pacific Ocean. Saybrook was named in honor of two of its primary investors: Lord Saye and Sele and Lord Brooke. John Winthrop the Younger was contracted as the colony's first governor, but he quickly left Saybrook after failing to enforce its authority over Connecticut's settlers. Lion Gardiner was left in charge of Saybrook's considerable fort when Winthrop left, defending it when it was besieged during the Pequot War. Governor George Fenwick arrived in the colony in 1639, but he quickly saw it as a lost cause. Fenwick negotiated the colony's sale to Connecticut in 1644 after interest in colonization dried up due to the investors' involvement in the English Civil War. The colony's founding document was the Warwick Patent, which was used to justify the existence of the Connecticut Colony, as Connecticut did not get a formal charter until 1662.

== History ==
The site of the colony was inhabited by the Niantic people, but the Niantics were pushed out of the land by the neighboring Pequot Indians. In 1614, Dutch explorer Adriaen Block was sent to explore eastern New Netherland, becoming the first European to sail up the Connecticut River. The Dutch feared English expansion in the region and sent a group of settlers from New Amsterdam in 1623. This effort was unsuccessful and the Dutch settlers returned after a few months. Dutch efforts to colonize the area were revived in 1632 when New Netherland director Wouter van Twiller sent Hans Eechyus to purchase land at the mouth of the Connecticut River from the local Indians. Eechyus subsequently built a fur trading post there and named it Kievet's Hook.

In 1631, Robert Rich, 2nd Earl of Warwick and president of the Council for New England, granted a patent to a group of Puritan noblemen giving them the right to all the land from the Narragansett Bay to the Pacific Ocean. Warwick lacked the authority to grant this patent without the rest of the Council's approval, but plans for colonization proceeded anyway. The Connecticut Colony used this patent to justify its existence, as it lacked a formal charter until 1662.

The founders of the colony were ardent Puritans and Parliamentarians, and they hoped that it would serve as a possible political refuge from Charles I. The group of investors included future Lord Protector Oliver Cromwell, John Hampden, Arthur Hesilrige, and John Pym, as well as Viscount Saye and Sele and Baron Brooke for whom the colony was named. The investment group had previously funded the failed colonies of Providence Island and Cocheco. The Puritan gentlemen, however, were not allowed to leave England and found it difficult to discreetly sell their English estates. Word spread by September 1635 concerning their intentions to emigrate to America, and they dared not attempt it. The investors instead offered to join the Massachusetts Bay Colony on the condition that they be established in the Massachusetts government as a hereditary nobility; Massachusetts rejected that condition due to its lack of a requirement that freemen be church members.

Massachusetts Bay Colony hired John Winthrop the Younger to remove the Dutch from the area, and he did so with a group of 20 men and two cannons. His men found the coat of arms of the Dutch West India Company nailed to a tree, so they took it down and replaced it with a shield with a smiling face. A Dutch ship soon came to the river's mouth, but it was intimidated by the English cannons and surrendered the fort to English control. Winthrop named the colony Saybrook in honor of William Fiennes, 1st Viscount Saye and Sele and Robert Greville, 2nd Baron Brooke, prominent Parliamentarians and the principal investors in the colony.

Winthrop, Hugh Peter, and Henry Vane the Younger spent the winter of 1635–36 attempting to convince the settlers of the Connecticut Valley to respect the authority of the new colony. Winthrop was given no instructions on incorporating these settlers into the colonial government, and he was unwilling to acquiesce to the gentlemen investors' demands of securing large plots of lands for themselves. He finally arrived in the colony in April 1636, but he found a lack of funding, settlers unwilling to accept the colony's authority, and hostile Indians. He therefore returned to Boston just a few months into his year-long contract as governor, leaving Lion Gardiner in charge of the fort.

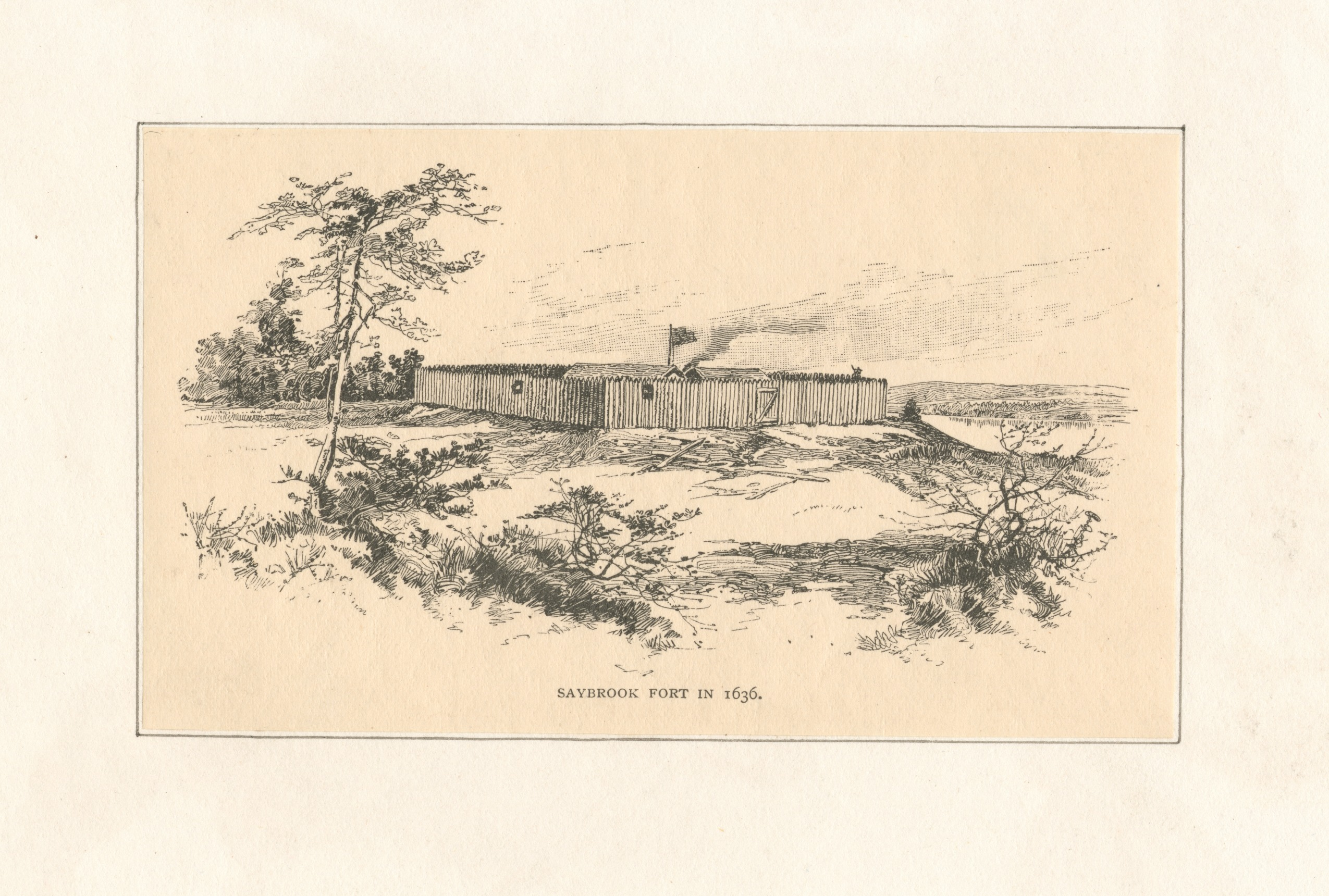
Illustration of Saybrook Fort in 1636

The three doors of Fort Saybrook were ten feet high and four feet wide, encircling an area of 2000 square feet. Several of the colony's settlers were veterans of the Thirty Years' War. Among these settlers was Lion Gardiner, who was in charge of constructing the fort and planning the town. As the fort was being constructed, Gardiner's wife Mary gave birth to son David, the first European child born in Connecticut. The defensive precautions proved useful during the Pequot War when the colony withstood a siege from September 1636 to April 1637, the longest engagement of the war. The fort lasted from 1635 to the winter of 1647/48 when it burned down, though it was quickly replaced with another fort closer to the river.

In 1639, George Fenwick arrived in the colony to replace Winthrop as governor. The English Civil War erupted in 1642, and the Colony's financial backers canceled plans to settle in Saybrook, instead deciding to fight for the Parliamentarian cause. With English support lost, Fenwick negotiated to sell the colony to the neighboring Connecticut Colony for an annual payment of 180 pounds of equal quantities of wheat, peas, and rye or barley. Fenwick sold the colony and returned to England, where he served as a colonel in the Civil War and became Member of Parliament for Morpeth and later governor of Berwick-upon-Tweed.

== Legacy ==
Oliver Cromwell was warmly regarded by the Puritan New Englanders, who often referred to him by his first name, including John Adams. The name Oliver remained popular in New England well after his death, despite waning in popularity in England. The town of Cromwell, Connecticut was also named in his honor. As late as 1864, town residents could still recall the plots of land that were to be assigned to the Puritan lords. The badge of Yale's Saybrook College is derived from the seal of the colony. The seal also established grapevines as a symbol of Connecticut. The colony's motto Qui Transtulit Sustinet ("He Who Transplanted Still Sustains") remains the motto of Connecticut today. Fenwick's wife Lady Anne Butler became a subject of local lore after her tombstone was removed to make room for a railroad.

== See also ==
- Lower Connecticut River Valley – Connecticut planning region covering the area
