= Edwin R. Yale =

Britannia ware merchant of New York

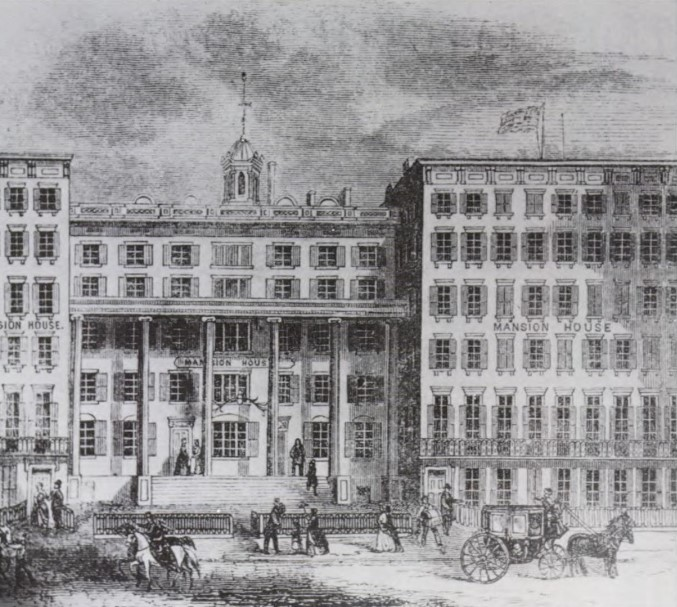
The "Mansion House", a 250 bedrooms hotel in Brooklyn Heights, facing Wall Street, family property and residence of Gen. Yale

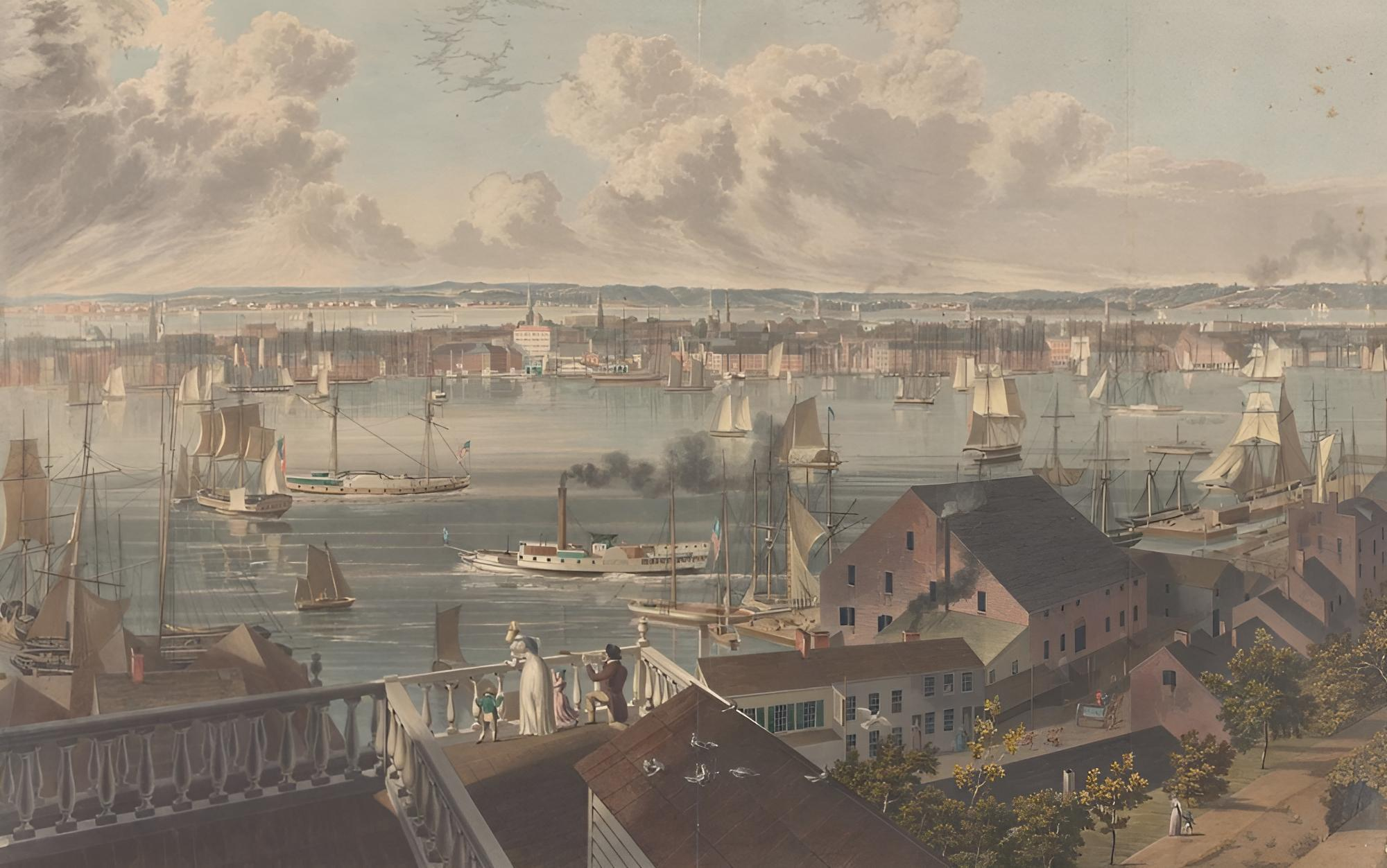
View from Brooklyn Heights of the US Hotel, (Holt's Hotel), the central white tower in Manhattan

General Edwin Rodolphus Yale (1804 – 1883) was an American military officer, Britannia ware manufacturer, and proprietor of the "United States Hotel", the largest hotel in America in the mid 1830s. He was also a founding member and the first president of the Sumter Club, an abolitionist society honoring the Fort Sumter event and the death of Abraham Lincoln.

== Early life ==
Edwin R. Yale was born August 8, 1804, in Meriden, New Haven County, to William Yale and Mary Johnson, members of the Yale family. Cousins included newspaper entrepreneur Moses Yale Beach and fur trader James Murray Yale. His grandfather was Samuel Yale Sr., the first manufacturer of the Yale dynasty in America. He was the first manufacturer in Meriden, Connecticut, beginning the production of hand cut nails in 1791, and manufacturing pewter buttons in 1794. From his ventures he acquired a large estate and his family gave their name to Yalesville, Connecticut.

Edwin's father was a wealthy tin ware manufacturer, the largest in Meriden, and occupied various offices in the legislature. He owned 5 factories in the city, along with 4 houses, and did business in New York with the Griswolds of Connecticut. Samuel Simpson and Isaac C. Lewis, associates of the Yales, would become prominent merchants, founders of Simpson, Hall, Miller & Co. and the Meriden Britannia Company. His nephew was Senator Charles Dwight Yale.

Edwin worked for his father at a young age, learning the tin business, starting in 1820 when he was 16 years of age. After being in partnership with his father, he opened a shop in Meriden, selling tin ware lamps. He was engaged in the pewter and britannia business with his father until 1826 or 1827.

In a 1827 advertisement, he is recorded as a manufacturer of "Japaned Lamps of all kinds and Pocket Lanterns of every description". By 1831, the tin ware business and factories of his father were turned over to him. In 1838, he is recorded managing the New York outlet of his uncle Samuel Yale Jr., who also owned multiple factories with his brothers Charles and Hiram, along with 12 houses in Meriden. Samuel was also cofounder and board director of the Meriden National Bank with Gen. Walter Booth and Ashbel Griswold.

By 1832, Edwin became a manufacturer of bronzed lamps and a dealer in various kinds of American goods, with warehouses in New York and Boston on Pearl Street and Liberty Street. From 1835 to 1836, he entered in a partnership under Yale & Henshaw, as merchants and spoonmakers, with a factory and store in Yalesville, and the raw materials acquired from Mr. Griswold. In 1837, they opened a shop in New York as commission merchants and Yale became a prominent manufacturer.

== Career ==
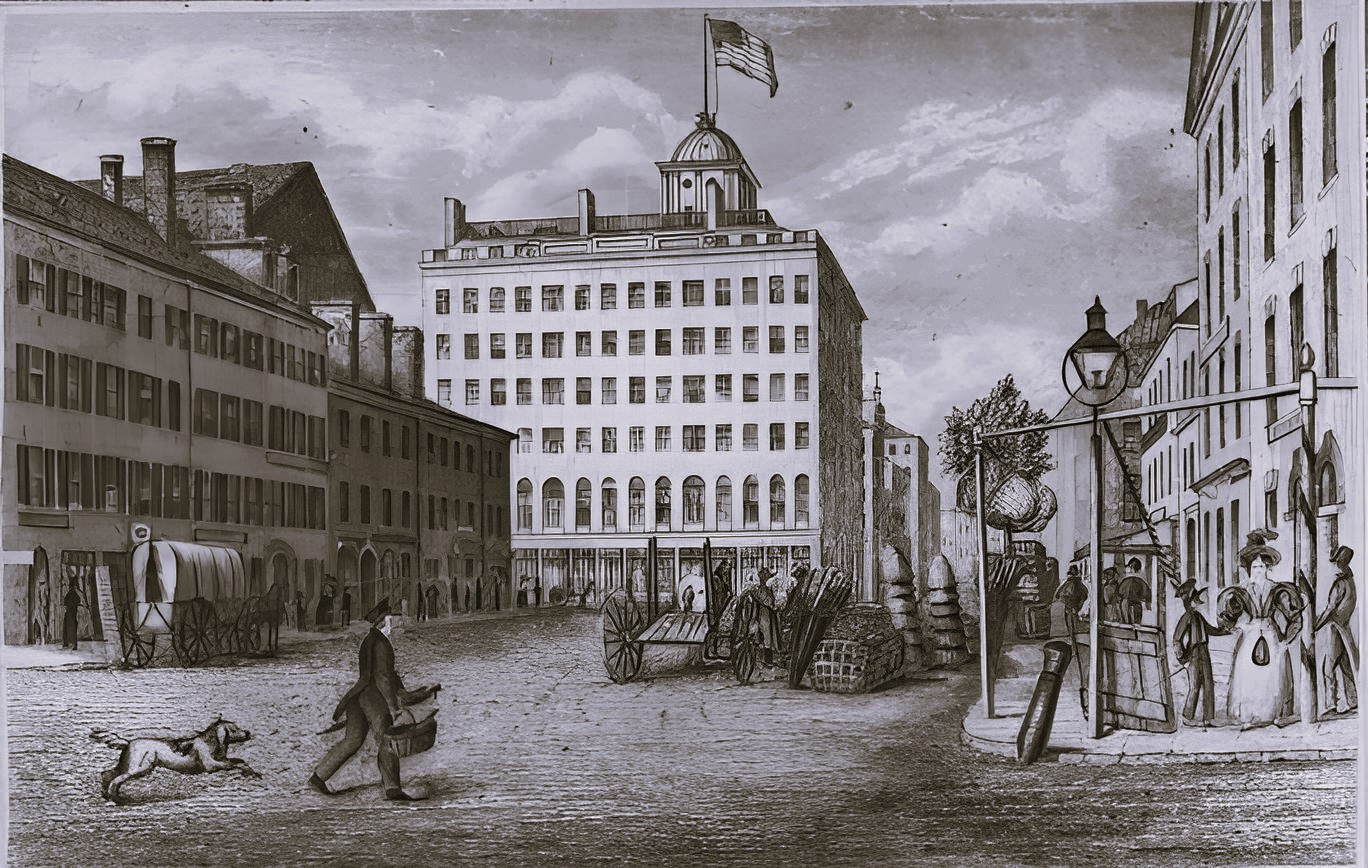
The "United States Hotel", construction started in 1827, corners of Fulton Street and Pearl Street, in South Street Seaport

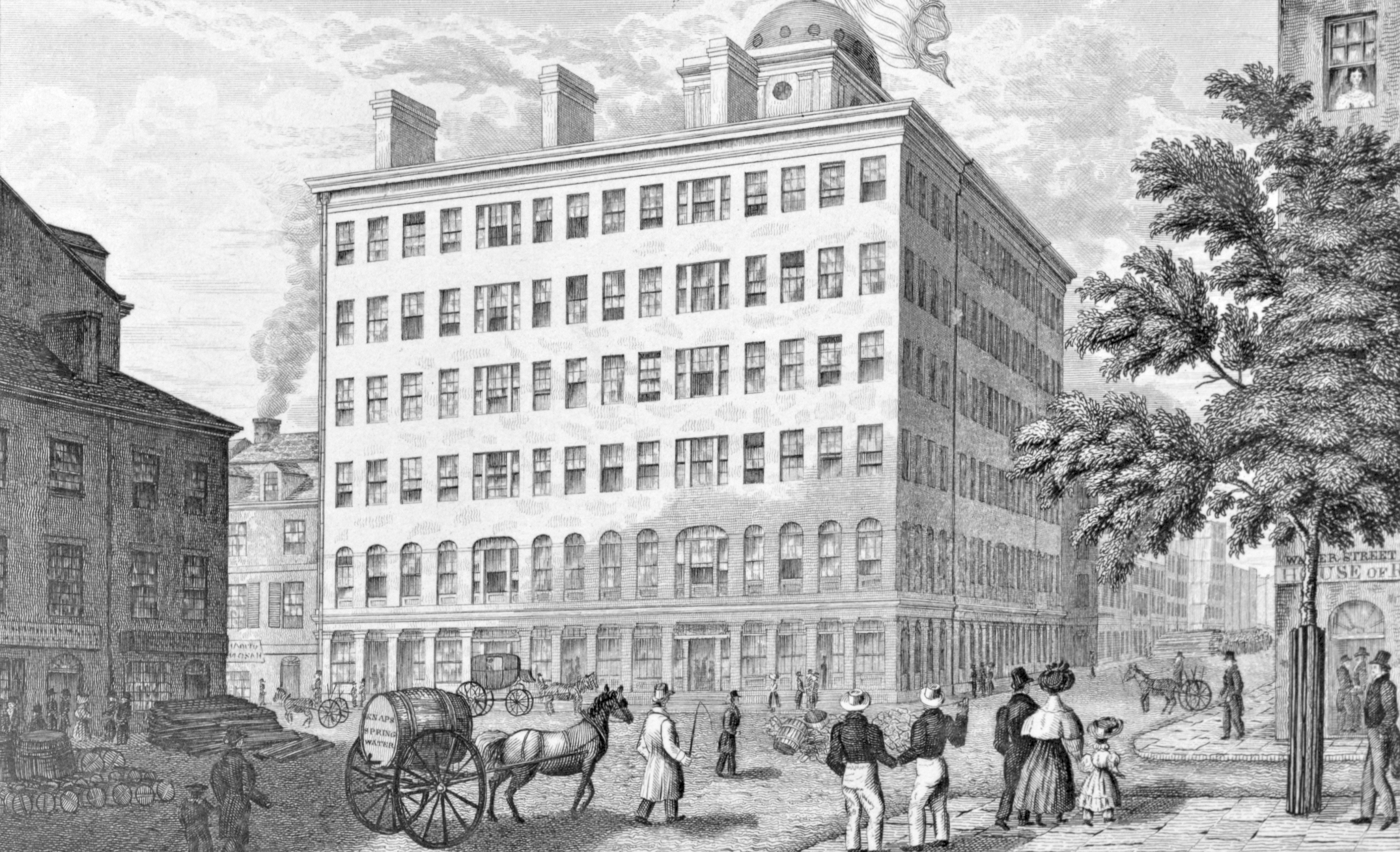
The "United States Hotel", a 225 rooms luxury hotel built in 1832 in Manhattan's Financial District, owned by General Edwin R. Yale, competitor of Astor House built in 1836 by John Jacob Astor

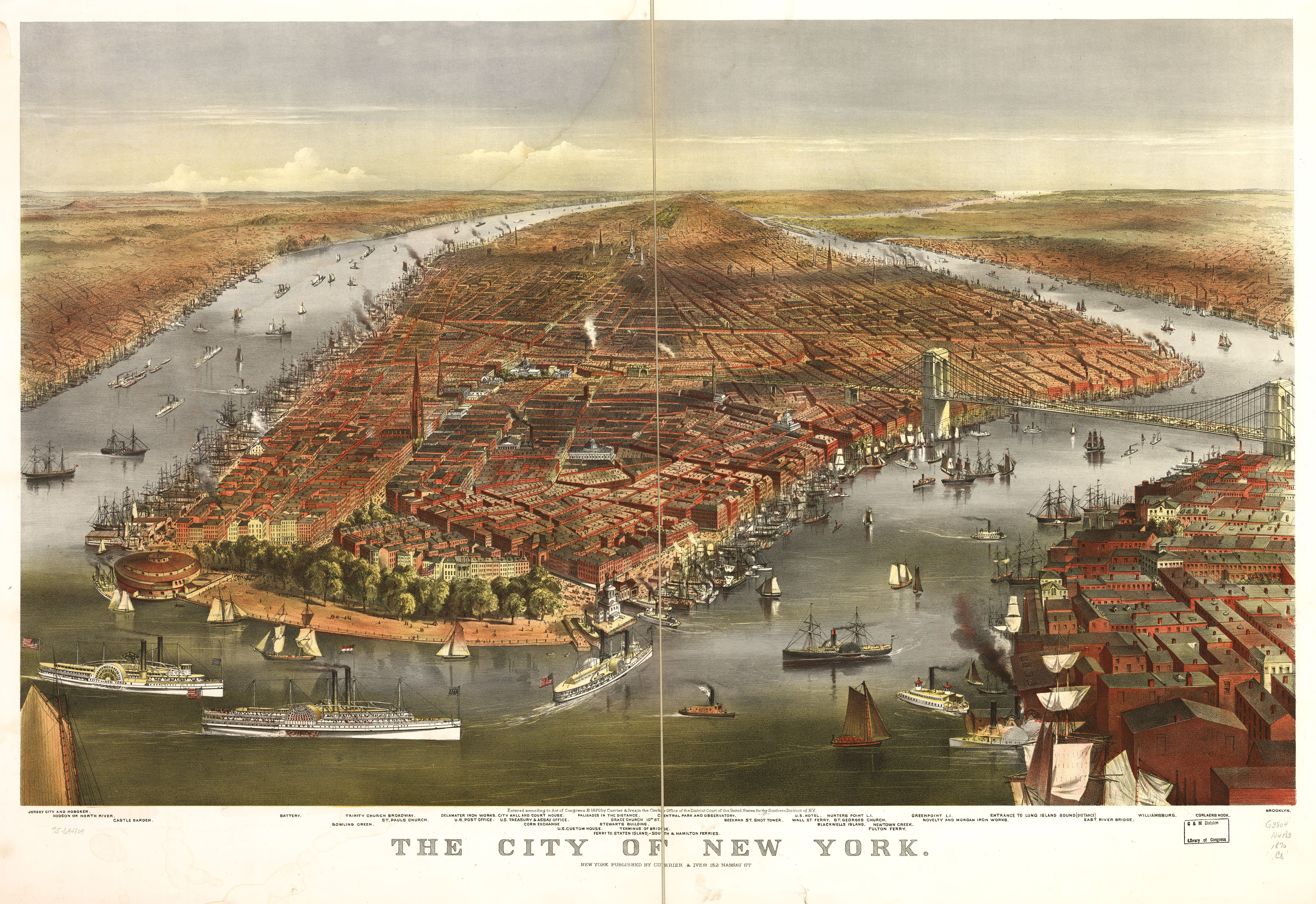
New York City, 1870, the "United States Hotel" (U.S. Hotel), is a white stone hotel on the right side, with its white coppola and US Flag, next to Brooklyn Bridge and Wall Street

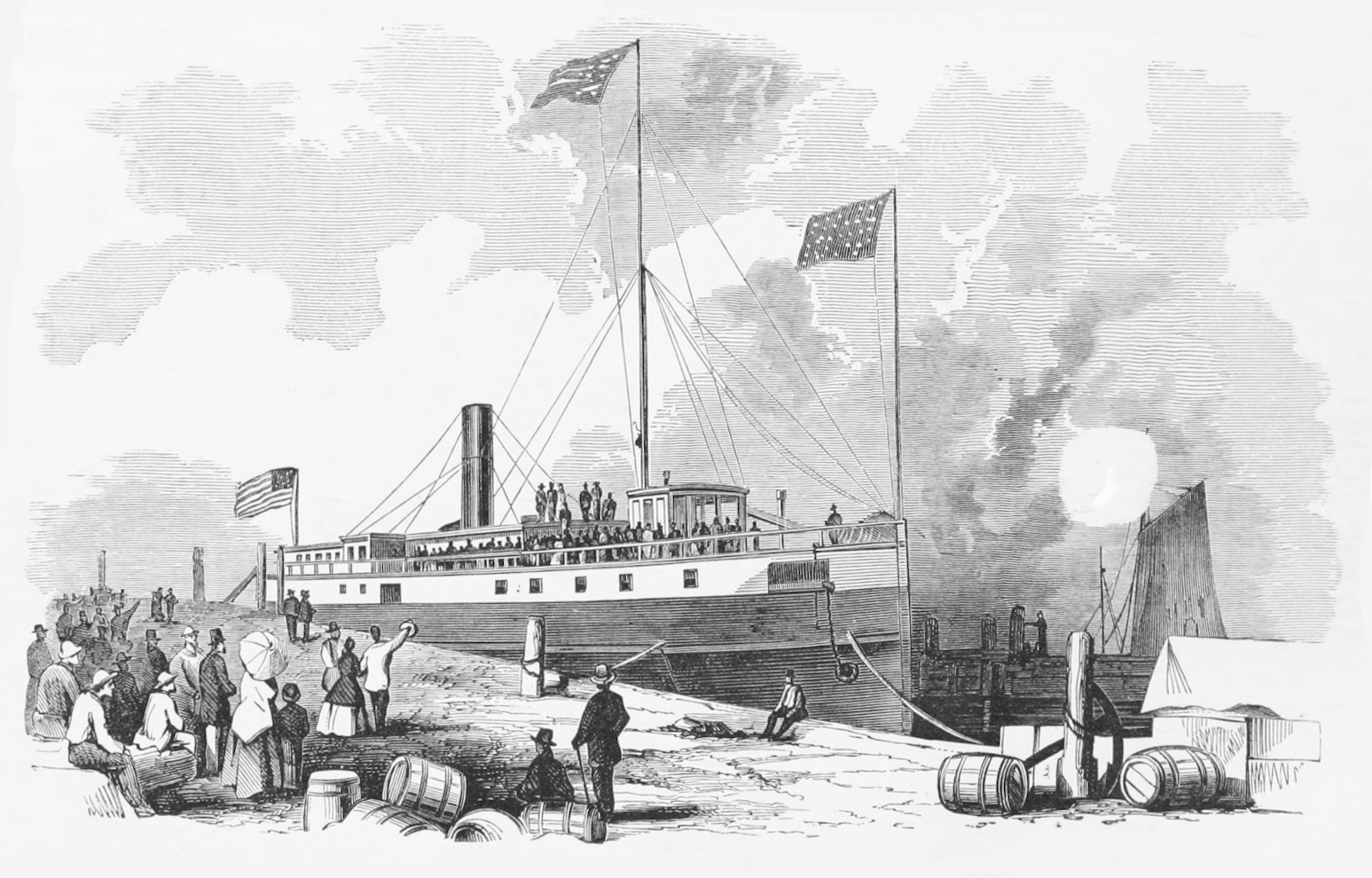
The "Oceanus" steamship, 1865, excursion for the official ceremony of Raising the Flag at Fort Sumter, with Gen. Yale aboard

Yale entered the military and was recorded a quartermaster and paymaster in 1826, later promoted to brigade major. In 1829, he was recorded as the Brigade quartermaster under Gen. Walter Booth. He was Brigade major and inspector under Gen. Amos Thomas. In the mid-1830s, he became Brigadier general of the New Haven Grays, 102nd Infantry Regiment, who were given orders to restore unrest in the city of New Haven until the outbreak of the American Civil War.

The New Haven Grays was previously the Guard of honor for U.S. President James Monroe, General Lafayette and President Andrew Jackson, during their official visits of New Haven, and was part of the Guard of Honor for the opening of the Centennial Exposition. Joining the regiment was on an invitation only basis, and they engaged in the first major battle of the Civil War, the Battle of Bull Run, and other engagements such as the Battle of Gettysburg.

Yale was the proprietor of the "United States Hotel" around 1836, a 225 rooms and 165 bedrooms hotel in Manhattan occupying the corners of Fulton Street and Pearl Street, in South Street Seaport, next to the Financial District near Wall Street. The hotel's construction started in 1827 but opened around 1831. The hotel was the largest and most luxurious in America at the time and was a resort for the prominent merchant in the city. In 1836, a competitor will emerge, the Astor House, built by John Jacob Astor, then the richest man in America.

Gen. Yale's property, the “United States Hotel”, was previously named “Holt”s Hotel”, and was built by cabinet maker Stephen B. Holt at a cost of $350,000 in 1832. The latter made his wealth by obtaining government contracts to supply food to the army during the War of 1812. Holt's Hotel is deemed the forerunner of the modern hotel, and is thought to be the inspiration for Astor House, which was built about three years later.

The building featured a cupola with an open terrace, and was used to receive signals from the watch tower on Governors Island, announcing arriving vessels, and watching New York Harbor. The hotel's dining hall had a capacity to entertain 2,000 guests, and the place was popular for sea captains, soldiers, ship owners, bankers and merchants, where they would go to the bar and on the rooftop, watching the ships passing nearby. The hotel was among the first to use a steam engine for the luggages and was the predecessor of the grand hotels built on Broadway in the 1850s, like the Metropolitan Hotel of Stephen Van Rensselaer, the St Nicholas Hotel, or the Fifth Avenue Hotel of Amos Eno.

Around the year 1840, Gen. Yale acquired and opened the Mansion House in Brooklyn Heights which he kept until 1882. The hotel was previously a school building named "The Female Institute", but it was closed down for lack of funding. The hotel was a success, and within seven years, Yale was forced to build an annex, adding 42 ensuite rooms at a cost of $60,000, making the hotel among the finest in the country. Inscriptions on the fireplaces included "To Live Long, Live Well" and "Waste Not, Spare Not", and the hotel had a garden in the back, and a café in the basement. Yale's whole brigade at the time of the New Haven Grays, which he commanded, would later be his guests at the hotel for an official visitation. Yale sold his establishment around 1882 to John C. Van Cleaf, a business associate of Mr. Peed, proprietor of Pierrepont House.

== Sumter Club ==
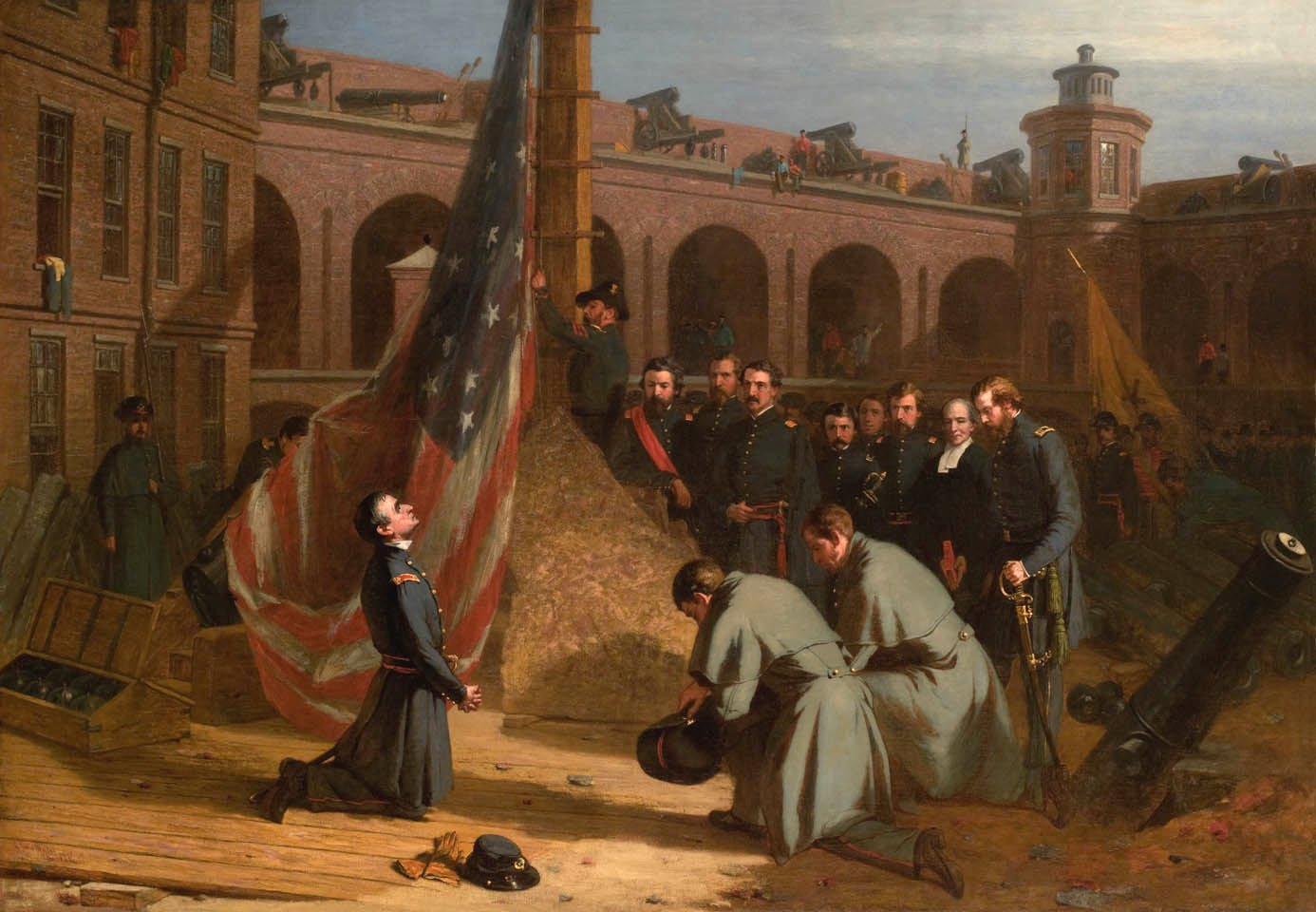
First time Major Robert Anderson, later General, raised the Flag at Fort Sumter

For the celebration of the end of the American Civil War, and General Lee's surrender to General Grant, Gen. Yale and his wife joined the excursion of re-raising the flag at Fort Sumter, the location where the Civil War had begun. The excursion was made possible by the Neptune Steamship Company and visits of various cities were done by General Edward Hatch and others on the "Oceanus" steamship. Passengers aboard included the Conklings and the Colgates, Congressman Amos Clark Jr., musician William Batchelder Bradbury, philanthropist Henry Chandler Bowen, Brooklyn mayor Alfred M. Wood, and about 200 others.

While docked on the Oceanus at Fort Monroe, on April 18, 1865, they received the news of Lincoln's assassination, which occurred on the same night of the Sumter flag ceremony. Following the passengers's sadness and disbelief, they decided to form an organization named the "Sumter Club" to annually commemorate this historical event, including the fort's commander, Gen. Robert Anderson, and president Abraham Lincoln for his leading role at saving the Union States.

Gen. Yale was elected its first president and the club organized meetings every year, hoping to make the day into a national holiday. The first meeting was held at Yale's hotel in Brooklyn Heights, facing Wall Street, named the “Mansion House”. Founders of the Sumter Club, including Gen. Yale, were Senator Stephen M. Griswold, of the Griswold family, Senator Cyrus P. Smith, Mayor of Brooklyn, lawyer Charlton Thomas Lewis, New York Post's managing editor, Edward Cary, New York Times's editor, Rev. Theodore L. Cuyler, an abolitionist minister, and a few others.

For the club's 20th anniversary of raising the flag on all the forts in Charleston Harbor, South Carolina, General Sherman sent the members a letter. A book was written about the excursion named “The Trip of the Steamer Oceanus to Fort Sumter and Charleston, S. C.” They brought back trophies to be presented to the Long Island Historical Society and New York Historical Society. The Sumter Club is also featured in Lincoln Bibliography, part of the Complete Works of Abraham Lincoln, published by the Abraham Lincoln Association.

== Death ==
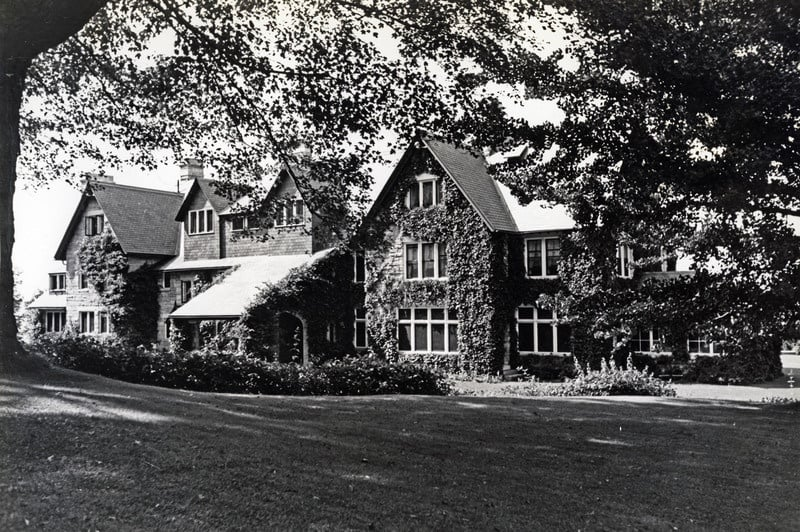
James Colby Colgate mansion, Bennington, Vermont, Gen. Yale's summer home "Underwood" was on the estate, belonging to his wife's family

Gen. Yale married in 1824 to Eliza Ives (1804-1846), daughter of Othniel Ives and Sarah Yale. Her father was deacon of the Baptist church and selectman of Meriden, and his brother, Levi Yale, was a merchant and soldier in the War of 1812, and afterwards the city's postmaster for 12 years. His brother-in-law was Elias Yale Ives, husband of Anna Griswold Plumb.

The couple had two sons together : William Rodolphus Yale (1824-1854) and Rollin E. Yale (1834-1839.

Yale married secondly to Emma A. West Conkling in 1847. He became the uncle by marriage of millionaire Hope Colgate (Hope Hubbell Conkling), wife of banker James C. Colgate, of the Colgate family of the Colgate-Palmolive conglomerate. Her second husband was William Travers Jerome Jr., son of politician William Travers Jerome, a cousin of Winston Churchill.

Colgate's father was financier James B. Colgate, the cofounder of the New York Gold Exchange and family member of Gov. Anthony Colby. His grandfather was William Colgate, benefactor of Colgate University. Yale's grandniece, Hope Hubble Colgate Sloane, married the nephew of William Douglas Sloane, husband of Emily Thorn Vanderbilt of the Vanderbilts.

Gen. Yale and his wife Emma had a mansion named "Underwood" next to their niece on the Colgate family estate in Bennington, whose main residence was a 55-room Tudor mansion. The Underwood estate was later sold to OSS diplomat Ferdinand L. Mayer.

Yale died December 30, 1883, at his estate in Bennington, Vermont. Following Gen. Yale's death, Edward A. Studwell was elected president of the Sumter club, with Gen. Charles Henry Howard, brother of Gen. Oliver O. Howard, as a vice-president. Guests at the meetings have included U.S. President Chester A. Arthur, Secretary of State James G. Blaine, Secretary William M. Evarts, Commanding General William T. Sherman, Gen. Quincy Adams Gillmore, abolitionist Rev. Henry Ward Beecher, and others.
