= Tuttle =

Tuttle may refer to:

== Places ==
=== Canada ===
- Tuttle, Alberta

=== United States ===
- Tuttle, Arkansas, an unincorporated community
- Tuttle, California, an unincorporated community and census-designated place
- Tuttle, Colorado, a ghost town
- Tuttle, Oklahoma, a city
- Tuttle, North Dakota, a city
- Tuttle Lake, Minnesota
- Tuttle Mountain, Colorado

== Businesses ==
- Tuttle Capital Short Innovation ETF, an American inverse exchange-traded fund listed on Nasdaq
- Tuttle Publishing, founded in Tokyo in 1948
- Tuttle Silver Company, a former American company

== Other uses ==
- Tuttle (surname), a list of people and fictional characters
- "Tuttle" (M*A*S*H), a 1973 episode from the television series M*A*S*H
- Comet Tuttle (disambiguation), several comets

== See also ==
- Tuttle House (disambiguation)
