= R. Wallace & Sons =

American silversmith company (1835–)

- Founded: 1835
- Headquarters: Wallingford, Connecticut, United States
- Area served: Predominately the United States
- Key people: Robert Wallace, F.A. Wallace, H.L. Wallace
- Products: Silver and plated ware, cutlery

R. Wallace & Sons (1835–) was formed in Wallingford, Connecticut, and incorporated in 1879. As of 1893, this company manufactured silver and plated ware and cutlery and had about 600 employees.

In 1887, William Hale Beckford, in Leading business men of New Haven county, described the company, "The valuable plant of the company is one of the most complete and extensive of its kind in the United States, the buildings being substantially built of brick, two and three stories in height, and covering an area of several acres of ground."

Over the years, the Wallace companies had three names: R. Wallace & Sons (1835–1856), Wallace Brothers Silver Company (1856–1884), and Wallace Silversmiths (founded 1875) Unique for the area, the Wallace companies did not become part of the International Silver Company and maintained its independence.

Many designs by R. Wallace & Sons, especially Modern ones, have been collected by American museums, including the Dallas Museum of Art, Wolfsonian FIU in Miami Beach, and the Mint Museum in Charlotte, NC, In 2005–07, Modernist silver designs by R. Wallace & Sons were featured in a traveling museum exhibition (Dallas Museum of Art; the Smithsonian in Washington; Wolfsonian FIU in Miami Beach; Nevada Museum of Art, Reno; and The Dixon Gallery and Gardens, Memphis). The designs have also been shown in exhibitions at the Dallas Museum of Art (2016–17), a traveling show organized by the Cleveland Museum of Art (1959–60) with six additional venues in Dallas, Dayton, Minneapolis, Portland (OR), St. Louis and San Francisco. In the 1930s, R. Wallace & Sons' designs were included in exhibitions at the Brooklyn Museum and the Metropolitan Museum of Art in New York.

== Wallace Silversmiths Inc. ==
Wallace Silversmiths, a prominent American manufacturer of sterling silver, is owned by Lifetime Brands.

It was founded by Robert Wallace, born in Prospect, Connecticut, on November 13, 1815. Wallace was the son of Scottish immigrant and silversmith James Wallace and his wife Irene (Williams), who had immigrated in the late 18th century. The boy had only a limited education, such as the sons of the farmers of that period received.

At the age of 16, Robert Wallace became an apprentice to Captain William Mix, a renowned spoon maker for the Meriden Britannia Company. A Meriden Britannia apprenticeship was highly sought after because the firm was the most successful cutlery and hollowware-producing firm in the Northeast.

Having mastered the art of silver craft, Robert Wallace left his apprenticeship, purchased a dilapidated gristmill, and began to produce his own cutlery. By 1833, Wallace's silver shop was up and running. As Wallace was skilled in spoon making, Wallace's only product was spoons.

=== Innovation ===
One day, while shopping in New York City, Wallace happened upon a piece of cutlery made of a nickel alloy called German silver that had been produced by Dixon and Sons of Sheffield, England. Impressed by the quality and strength of the piece, Wallace bought the formula from the German chemist Dr. Louis Feuchtwanger, who had a small bar of that metal from Germany for the then-unheard sum of $20 and went on to build these new nickel silver spoons. Later, Wallace found a man who had brought the metal recipe. Wallace purchased that, too. In his factory, Wallace then compounded the first German silver made in America and pioneered the new industry.

=== Production ===
Wallace moved a factory from Cheshire, Connecticut, to a point on the Quinnipiac River in Wallingford, Connecticut. There, Wallace increased production of spoons and cutlery. When the factory was in Cheshire, Wallace produced three dozen spoons per day. In Wallingford, the factory made nine dozen daily.

Wallace realized the importance of diversifying his business and began producing a complete range of flatware using the nickel alloy formula, using the business name Wallace Silversmiths Inc.

=== Growth ===
Wallace did contract work for the next five decades, producing cutlery for several firms worldwide. Wallace would sign a contract with a flatware manufacturer and produce a given piece for a set number of years. Generally, these contracts lasted about 10 years.

The industry continued to grow and eventually assumed large proportions during this period. Wallace produced cutlery for firms such as Hall, Elton & Co., Fred R. Curtiss Co., and Meriden Britannia Co. In 1855, Wallace partnered with Samuel Simpson to produce German flatware. During this period, the business was called R. Wallace and Co., representing an investment of $12,000.

Later, Wallace would partner with a group of managers with the Meriden Britannia Company. At this point, the company was called Wallace, Simpson, and Co., and by 1865, the business was worth $100,000. By 1871, Wallace had purchased the balance of his partner's shares and, together with two of his sons, renamed the growing company R. Wallace & Sons Mfg. Co.

The factory added to its products sterling goods and high-grade nickel-silver-plated ware, both flat and hollow. Still later, by experiment, Mr. Wallace devised a new process of manufacture from steel. It made a less bulky, firmer, and lighter base for silver plating.

In 1871, Wallace, his sons, and sons-in-law formed a new company, Wallace Brothers, which produced silver-plated flatware on a stainless steel base. (By 1879, Wallace Brothers had merged with R. Wallace and Sons Mfg. Co.)

In 1875, Wallace introduced the first three sterling patterns to feature the esteemed Wallace name - Hawthorne, The Crown, and St. Leon. These beautiful patterns were soon followed by sterling and silver-plated holloware.

Over the next century, the company continued to grow. R. Wallace and Sons Mfg. Co. invested heavily in new machinery and skilled artisans.

As America's Gilded Age gathered steam, the firm saw continued success with additional sterling flatware designs and began producing both plated and sterling hollowware. Its reputation for quality grew in the early twentieth century, and more patterns were developed. Years passed, and Wallace's reputation for excellence in silversmithing grew.

=== Legacy ===
Robert Wallace died on June 1, 1892, and the sons and son-in-law continued the business. It grew to be the world's largest manufacturer of flat tableware. At the start of the 20th century, about 3 tons of steel and 1.5 tons of nickel silver were used daily. The company opened selling houses in New York City and Chicago. The company's success brought prosperity to Wallingford.

The 1930s were spent improving R. Wallace Mfg. Co.'s mass production techniques. The company released a series of sterling silver patterns created by designer William S. Warren, including Rose Point (1934), Sir Christopher (1936), Stradivari (1937), Grande Baroque (1941), Grand Colonial (1942), and Romance of the Sea (1950). These patterns are called "Three Dimension" because the design of these patterns is apparent from the front, back, or profile. Each pattern remains popular; the Grande Baroque pattern remains a best-seller. In 1947, Warren wrote a book, published by Wallace Silversmiths, called "Wallace Beauty Moods in Silver" to discuss five of the six "Three Dimension" designs.

In 1956, R. Wallace and Sons Mfg. Co. purchased the Watson Company and relocated to The Watson Company's Wallingford, Connecticut factory. After the company's relocation, its name became Wallace Silversmiths. In 1958, they purchased both the Tuttle Silver Company and Smith & Smith Company. As a result of this growth, the Hamilton Watch Company of Lancaster, Pennsylvania, acquired Wallace Silversmiths in 1959.

Over the next three decades, the ownership of Wallace Silversmiths would change three more times. Wallace Silversmiths remained a subsidiary of the Hamilton Watch Company (Hamilton Watch sold Wallace Stainless Division to Vose Associates in 1963 or 1964) until 1983, when the then 150-year-old company was sold to Katy Industries of Elgin, Illinois. In 1986, Syratech Corporation, which also owned Towle Silversmiths, acquired Wallace Silversmiths from Katy Industries. On April 1, 1987, Wallace Silversmiths' corporate headquarters was moved from Connecticut to East Boston, MA.

In 2006, Lifetime Brands acquired Syratech's assets. The company continues to design sterling, silverplate, and stainless steel flatware.
