= William Yale (merchant) =

Tin ware manufacturer from Connecticut (1784-1833)

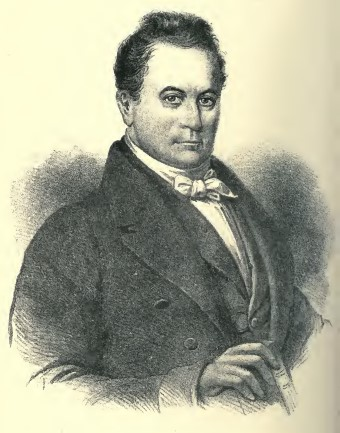
- Hon. William Yale, portrait
- Born: March 13, 1784; Meriden, Connecticut, United States
- Died: January 23, 1833 (aged 48)
- Occupations: Merchant and politician
- Known for: Being the largest manufacturer in Meriden, Connecticut and member of the Yale manufacturing dynasty
- Spouse: Mary Johnson (m. 1803)
- Children: 13 including Edwin R. Yale

William Yale (1784 – 1833) was an American tin ware merchant, politician, Justice of the Peace, and the largest manufacturer in Meriden, Connecticut. He was the oldest son of Revolutionary War patriot Samuel Yale Sr., founder of the Yale manufacturing dynasty of Connecticut. He also served in the Connecticut State House of Representatives from Meriden in 1825, and did business with the Griswolds. His entreprises were succeeded by his son, Gen. Edwin R. Yale, proprietor of the U.S. Hotel and Mansion House in New York.

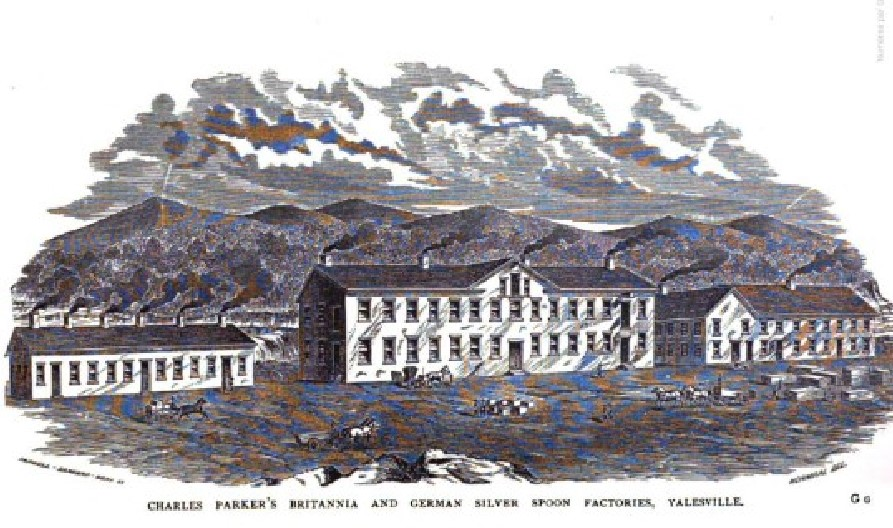
Old Yale factory, Yalesville, became Charles Parker Co.

== Early life ==
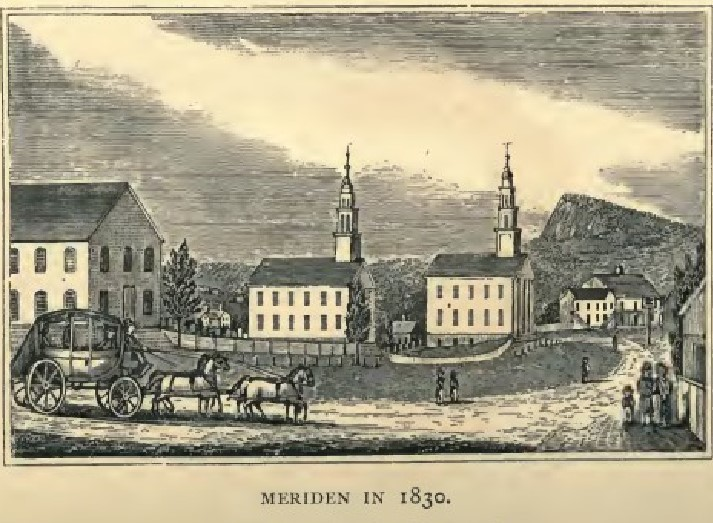
Meriden in 1830

William Yale was born March 13, 1784, to wealthy merchant Samuel Yale (b. 1763) and Eunice Paine, members of the Yale family. His great-grandfather, Samuel Yale (b. 1711), son of Capt. and magistrate Theophilus Yale, was a wealthy landowner in Wallingford, now Yalesville. His ancestor, Capt. Thomas Yale, was one of the cofounders of Wallingford in 1670, son of Capt. Thomas Yale, a cofounder of New Haven Colony with his father-in-law, Gov. Theophilus Eaton. One of William Yale's cousin was Ann Aurelia Yale, who married cabinet maker Jesse Adams, who was from a cousin branch of the Adams family of Gen. Charles Francis Adams.

The Yales imported skilled artisans from England following the end of the American War of Independence and changes in taxes from America's separation from Britain, and took the lead in the manufacture of Britannia goods, selling them throughout the country through peddlers. Members of his family were also prominent as early settlers and leaders in Connecticut, and owned large tracts of land.

William's father was the first manufacturer in the town of Meriden, Connecticut, starting manufacturing cut nails in 1791, and pewter buttons in 1794, from which he accumulated a large estate. He was the founder of the Yale manufacturing dynasty of Meriden and Wallingford, and had been a patriot during the American War of Independence, having enrolled under Colonel Canfield's militia regiment, a personal correspondent of George Washington.

His mother's family traced their descent from Sir Thomas Payne, Knight of Market Bosworth, whose arms were the same as those adopted by Hugues de Payens, first Grand Master of the Templars. His grandfather Street Yale was also a patriot of the War of Independence, being enlisted under Col. Charles Webb in the Boston campaign, and assigned to Gen. Sullivan's brigade on Winter Hill. He later enlisted in Capt. Couch's brigade, and served at Fort Lee and defended Fort Washington under General Greene's command until the entire garrison was captured. Fourteen members of the Yales of Connecticut served in the War of Independence, and some notable cousins of William included fur trader James Murray Yale and newspaper entrepreneur Moses Yale Beach.

== Career ==
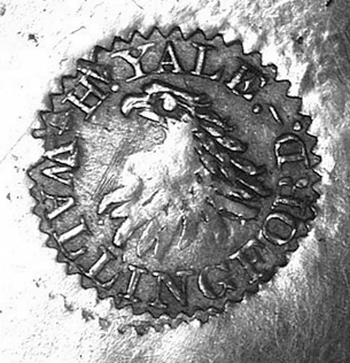
The "Eagle mark" of H. Yale & Co., from William's son, Hiram Yale, work featured at the Metropolitan Museum of Art

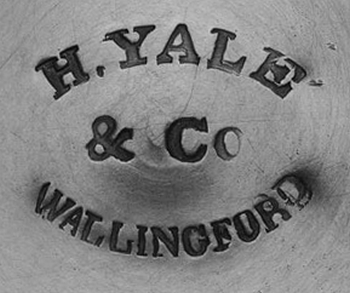
H. Yale & Co. plate marking

William Yale attended the schools of Meriden until he was old enough to start working for the family business. The family shop was located on a hill near the location of the Center Congregational Church of Meriden, and William started working for his father in 1791, manufacturing cut nails. In 1794, with his brother Samuel Jr., they started the manufacture of pewter buttons. The enterprise evolved into a tin ware business, and involved all the sons of Samuel Sr. With his brother Samuel, they established the Meriden branch of the family while his younger brothers Charles, Selden and Hiram, established their primary business in Yalesville, Connecticut, giving their name to the area. His fifth brother Ivah was a tinner.

Yale began his mercantile business selling pint cups, pewter plates, japanned canisters, long combs and other wares. At the beginning of the War of 1812, he assumed political posts in Meriden. In 1817, he purchased for $2,500 the land of what is now the whole West of Meriden, with a contract note of $1,800, which he was later forced to pay cash in full amount, which he complied. As safety was an issue at the time, he arranged a meeting at a hotel with his son, watching the strangers passing by, and met the sheriff of Hartford. They had drinks together and he then emptied the whole sum in sixpences and shillings on the table, surprising the sheriff who responded by stating that it would take him one week to count it, to which Yale replied "Very well... I don't doubt it, for it has taken me six months to get it".

For a few years he ran a business in Richmond as a Connecticut traveler, then in 1818, he returned permanently to Meriden. He started the manufacture of Japan tin lamps from 1820 to 1831. He established a partnership during the war with his brother Samuel Jr., establishing a pewter business. During this time, William Yale became the largest manufacturer in Meriden, exceeding Ashbel Griswold's pewter and britannia business.

He made frequent trips to Boston by horse, loading the bags with sheets of tinned iron with the help of a sail-maker, and resold them in Meriden as tinned articles. In 1820, he is also recorded as a manufacturer of Japan tin lamps and lamps of every description. In the Meriden tax records, he is listed with 5 factories in town, with 4 houses and hundreds of acres of land. From 1830 to 1831, he is listed as a lamp manufacturer in New York, dealing with the Griswolds.

From 1826 or 1827, he was in business with his son, Gen. Edwin R. Yale, later proprietor of the largest hotel in America in Manhattan, and of another hotel in Brooklyn Heights. In 1832 and 1833, William Yale is recorded as the Justice of the Peace of Meriden, and Commissioner on turnpike, roads, bridges, ferries and others. His son Samuel III became a manufacturer of Britannia metal, spoons and coffee mills, and complained of his inability to sell buttons and spoons because of the lifting embargo, which was affected by the War of 1812.

Samuel thereafter did business with Isaac Curtis Lewis, founder of the Meriden Britannia Company. His uncles Hiram and Charles Yale were also the employer of Samuel Simpson, founder of Simpson, Hall, Miller & Co., and husband of Mary Yale, daughter of John Yale, a cousin. Hiram's work is now featured at the Metropolitan Museum of Art in New York. William Yale's nephew, Senator Charles Dwight Yale, became a large shareholder and treasurer of Simpson's enterprise. He also had a niece, Sarah Yale, who married to Senator Edgar Atwater, and was aunt-in-law of Judge William Gardner Choate.

Charles Yale, William's brother, would later expand the Brtiannia businesses and establish stores in New York, Richmond, Virginia, and other business centers. He was a pioneer of the industry which later became the Wilcox Silver Plate Co. and International Silver Company of Meriden and Wallingford. In addition, he served in the Connecticut state legislature. William Yale was elected to the Connecticut State House of Representatives from Meriden in 1825, with Oliver Wolcott Jr. as Governor of Connecticut. Another brother named Samuel also owned 12 houses in Meriden, a few factories, and was a board director and cofounder of the Meriden National Bank with Major General Walter Booth, Ashbel Griswold and Yale lawyer Silas Mix, Governor Edwards's secretary. The bank is the oldest in Meriden, and began its business with $100,000 in capital in 1833 from William Yale's home, later relocated to a newly built bank building on Broad Street.

== Death ==
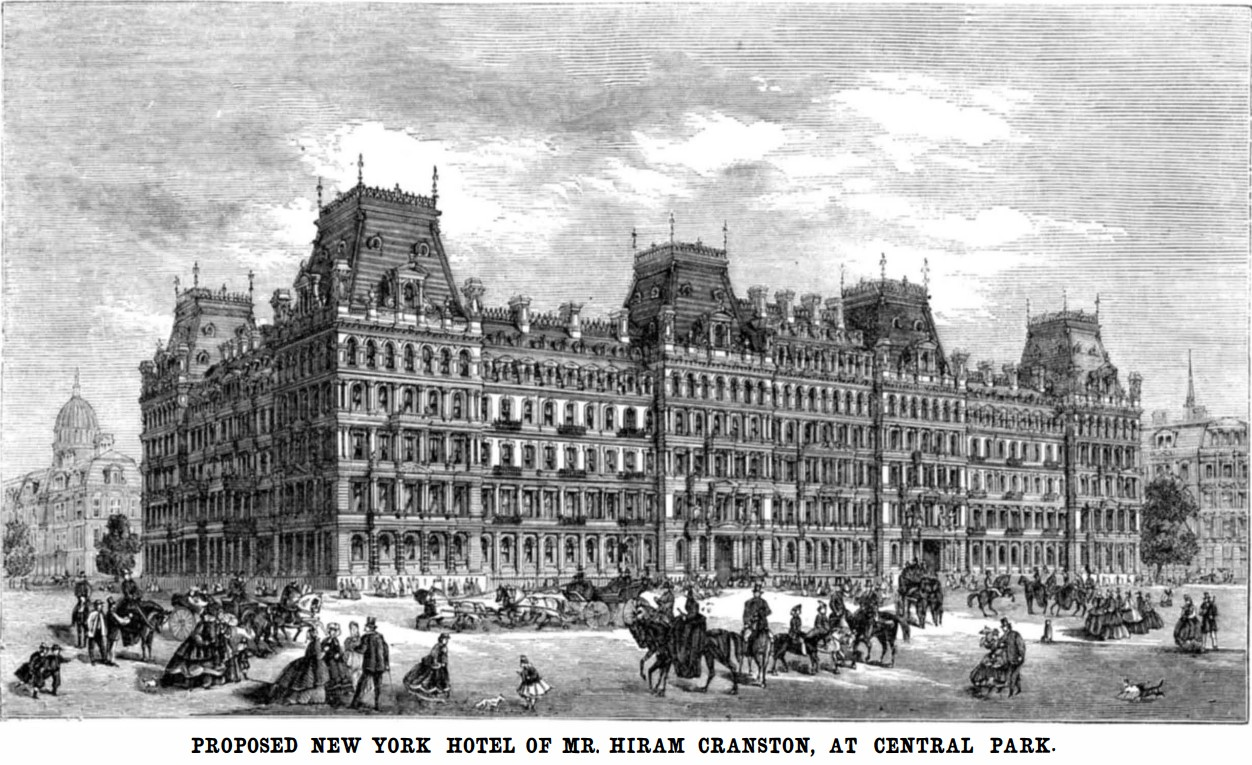
A second New York Hotel proposed by Hiram Cranston, Central Park, in Scientific American, 1867

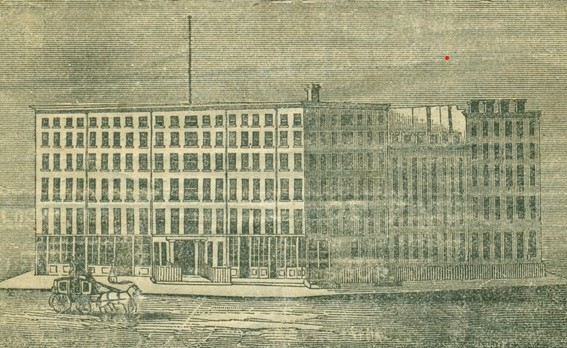
The New York Hotel, 721 Broadway, Manhattan, property of his son-in-law, Hiram Cranston, 1849

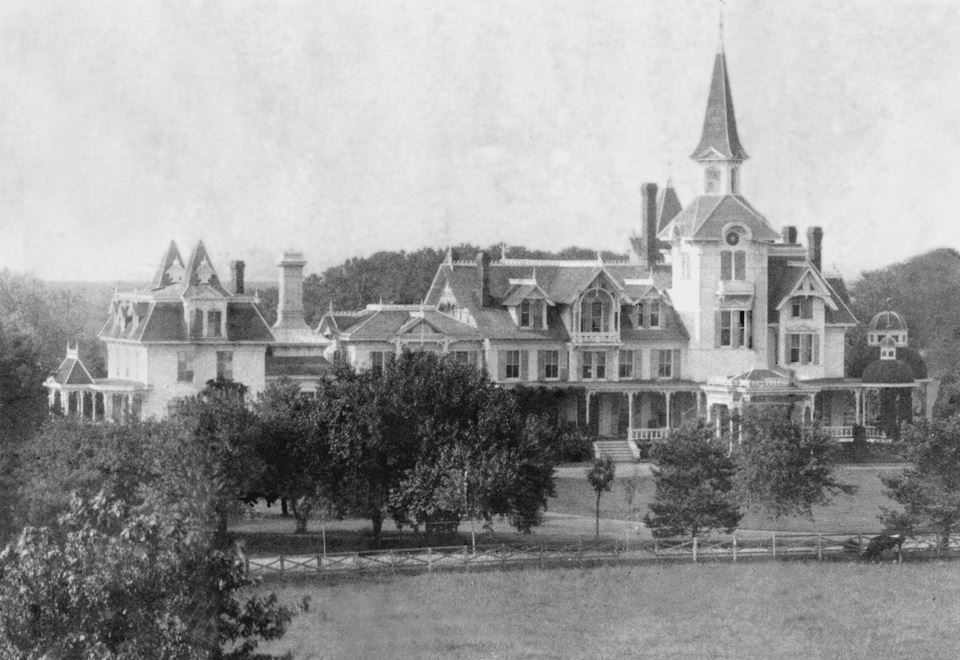
"Deer Range Farm" residence of Yale's grandson, James N. Plumb, 1850

William Yale married Mary Johnson of Wallingford, on November 20, 1803, by whom he had 13 children. Among his notable children were :

- Gen. Edwin R. Yale, who married to Eliza Ives, daughter of deacon Othniel Ives, and to Emma A. West, of the family of financier James Boorman Colgate, cofounder of the New York Gold Exchange. Gen. Yale was a proprietor of hotels in New York, including the largest one at the time, competitor of the Astor House of John Jacob Astor, and was a founding member of the Sumter Club, an abolitionist society.
- Jeannette F. Yale, who married to merchant James Madison Plumb, parents of Grace Anne, the wife of artist George H. Hughes, members of the Social Register of New York. He was an artist from Paris, student at the Académie Julian under professors Jean-Paul Laurens, Benjamin-Constant and Léon Bonnat, who was tutor of Braque and Toulouse-Lautrec, and Hughes painted for U.S. vice-president Levi Parsons Morton.
- Melissa D. Yale, who married to Rev. Rollin Heber Neale, pastor of the First Baptist Church of Boston, committee member of Harvard, and Doctor of Divinity from Harvard and Columbia.
- Augusta Ann Yale, who married to Hiram Cranston, proprietor of the New York Hotel, one of the largest in Manhattan. The hotel was at 721 Broadway, between Washington Square Park and Waverly Place. Cranston also cofounded the Manhattan Club with Attorney General John Van Buren, son of U.S. President Martin Van Buren, and a few others. His friends at the club included Commodore Vanderbilt, his son-in-law Congressman Horace F. Clark, and Congressman Richard Schell, of the family of Winston Churchill.
- Catherine E. Yale, who married to merchant John Plumb. She became the mother of Helen Plumb, who married to diplomat Henry L. Atherton, family of Congressman Charles Humphrey Atherton and Senator Charles G. Atherton, and relatives of the Woodworth political family. She was also the mother of James Neale Plumb, a merchant in New York, proprietor of the "Deer Range Farm" estate on Long Island.
- Henry Clay Yale, who married to Amelia White, family of Lt. Thomas White of the American War of Independence, whose son was adopted by Founding Father Friedrich Wilhelm von Steuben, a Prussian baron and general, friend of Mad Anthony Wayne. Yale was a dry goods merchant, member of the Union League Club of New York, cofounder of Townsend & Yale, one of the oldest and largest brokerage house in America, and father of Yale graduate William Henry Yale. William Henry was the father of spy William Yale, and the granduncle of CIA Director of Finance Thomas B. Yale (d. 1997).

William Yale died on January 23, 1833, aged 49 years. His enterprises were succeeded by his son Gen. Yale.
