= Charles Dwight Yale =

Senator from Connecticut

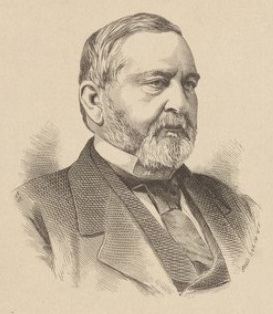

Connecticut State Senator

Member of the Connecticut State Senate from the 6th district
- In office 1883–1884
- Preceded by: Edward F. Jones
- Succeeded by: William H. Golden

Personal details
- Born: Charles Dwight Yale; April 23, 1810 Wallingford
- Died: March 30, 1890 (aged 79) Wallingford, Connecticut
- Party: Democratic
- Spouse: Mary Culver
- Children: 3

Charles Dwight Yale (1810 – 1890), of Wallingford, Connecticut, was a Democratic state senator and businessman, co-proprietor of Simpson, Hall, Miller & Co. During the Reconstruction era, he played a leading role in mediating conflicts between Virginia and the Union States.

== Early life ==
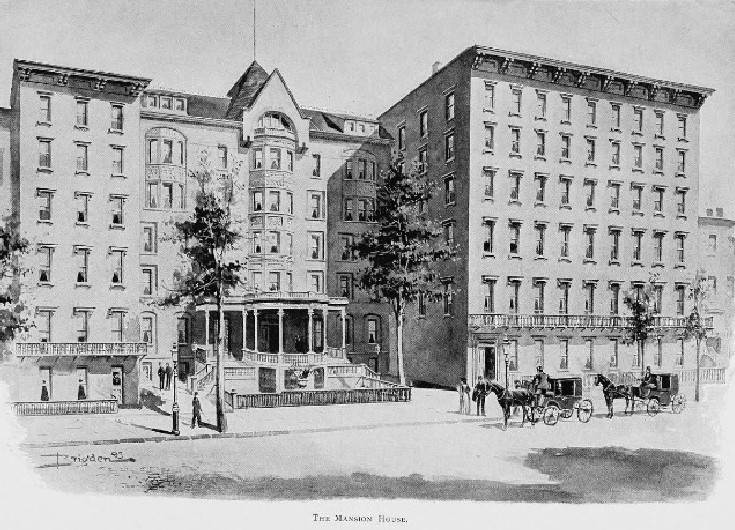
The "Mansion House Hotel", around 1893, a 250 bedrooms hotel in Brooklyn Heights, facing Wall Street, property and residence of Senator Yale's uncle

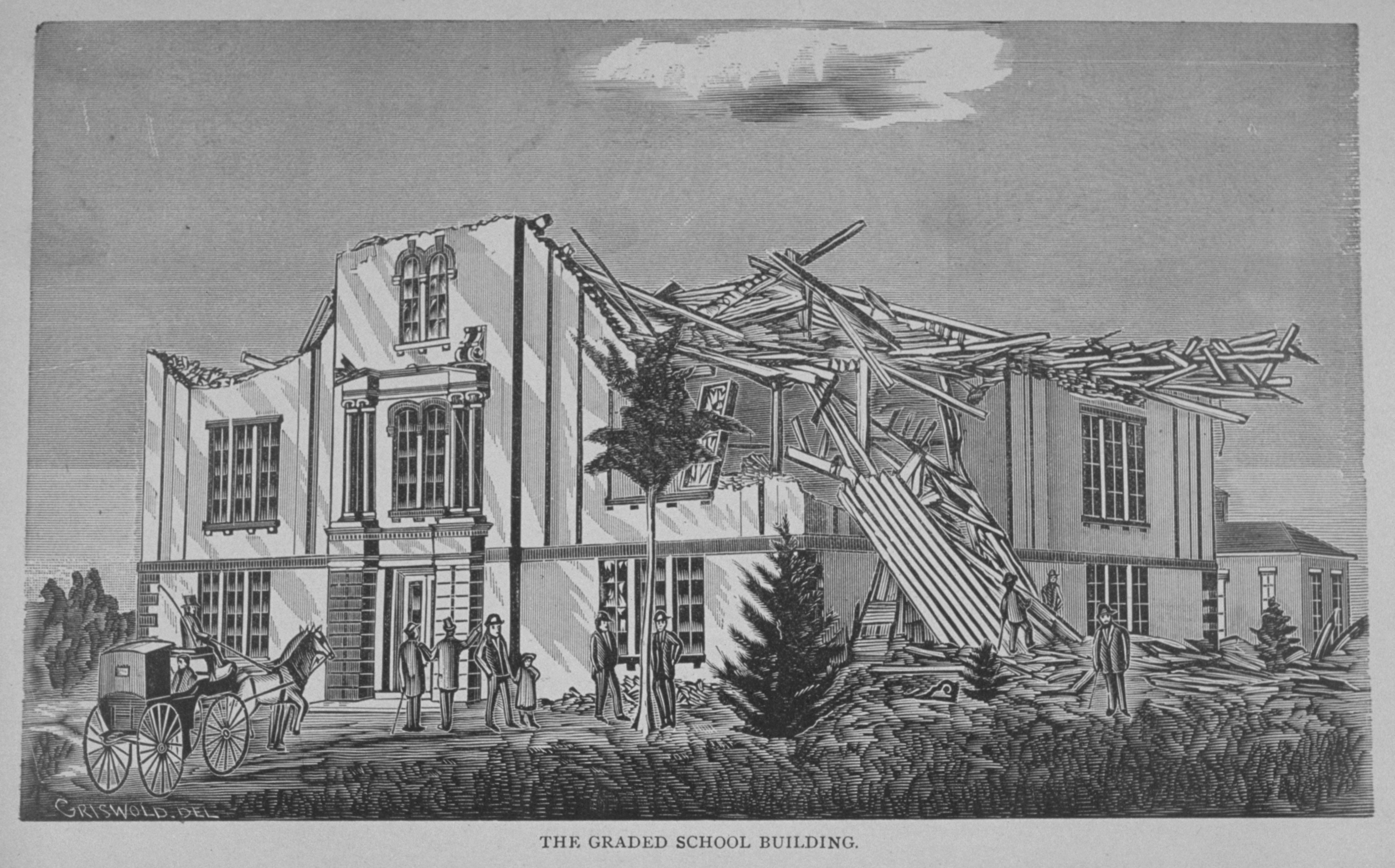
The 1878 Wallingford tornado, showing the damage done to the city school

Charles Dwight Yale was born on April 23, 1810, in Wallingford, Connecticut, to Charles Yale and Huldah Robinson, members of the Yale family. His father served in the state legislature, and was a Britannia metal and tin ware manufacturer, along with his brothers William, Hiram and Selden.

His family were pioneers in the manufacturing of Britannia ware in the United States, and established a manufacturing dynasty in the region.

His uncle, Gen. Edwin R. Yale, was a merchant manufacturer, proprietor of the U.S. Hotel (Holt's hotel), a 165 bedrooms hotel in Manhattan on Fulton Street in South Street Seaport, the largest in the country at the time, and of the 250 bedrooms Mansion House in Brooklyn Heights. The U.S. Hotel was a competitor of Astor House of John Jacob Astor.

His grandfather, Samuel Yale Sr., was the first manufacturer in Meriden, Connecticut, manufacturing pewter buttons in 1794, and was a Patriot of the American War of Independence. From their manufacturing businesses, with factories and stores in Connecticut, New York and Richmond, they gave their name to Yalesville, Connecticut.

== Career ==
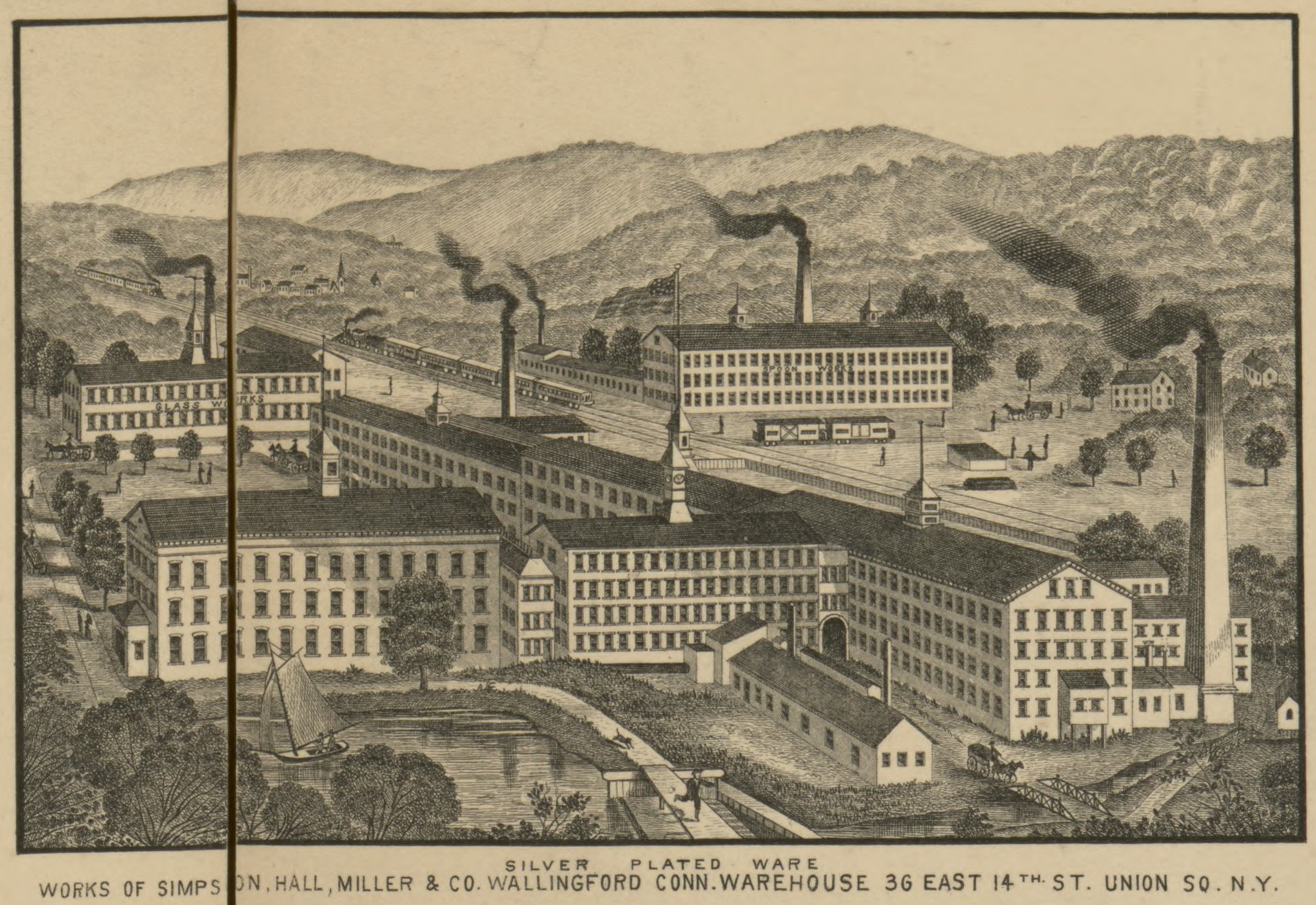
Connecticut factories of Simpson, Hall, Miller & Co., Senator Yale was a stockholder and its treasurer

Yale was born in Connecticut but sent at sixteen years of age to Richmond, Virginia, to assist in the management of his father's businesses in the city. He later established his own general store in Richmond, and by 1860, built and owned one of the largest warehouses in the city.

He became a member of the city council, acting as a peacemaker during the Civil War, and introduced in a speech Gov. Gilbert C. Walker for nomination, becoming the first governor elected since the state joined the Union.

He was made foreman of the grand jury of the county's district court by Chief Justice Chase, and made treasurer of the Peabody fund committee, helping in the establishment of the public school system. In 1871, he went back to Connecticut, connecting with past business relations.

In 1874, Yale was elected a member of the Connecticut State House of Representatives, serving on the Committee on Humane Institutions, and later, as chairman of the committee. In 1875, he was once again elected to the House and served on the Committee on Banks.

He became a considerable stockholder and officer of Simpson, Hall, Miller & Co., later the International Silver Company, serving as treasurer from 1871 to 1887. The capital stock of the enterprise was recorded at $275,000 in 1870, with $400,000 in working capital.

Yale was made president of the Silver Plated Ware Manufacturers Associations. In 1875, and from 1883 to 1884, he was twice elected senator with the Democrats from the 6th Senatorial District. In 1878, he served as the Warden of Wallingford during the 1878 Wallingford tornado, which brought much damage to the city and number of casualties, and while in office, he made a strong effort to secure state aid for the sufferers.

During the Reconstruction era, following the end of American Civil War, he was placed on frequent committees to mediate tensions between Washington and Virginia. He also helped to bring Virginia back into the Union States.

He was nominated in 1884 by his party to be president of the senate. In Richmond, he had been a member of the First Presbyterian Church, while in Wallingford, he joined the First Congregational Church. Yale died on March 30, 1890.

== Family ==
Charles Dwight Yale married December 3, 1834, Mary Culver, of Wallingford. They had three children :

- Martha A., born May 30, 1836 : she died young
- Charles B., born April 7, 1843 : he became president of the Board of Education, president and board director of the Dime Savings Bank of Wallingford, and deacon of the Congregational Church. He was also a shareholder and board director of Simpson, Hall, Miller & Co.
- George S., born Dec. 24, 1846 : he ran the Simpson's business stores in Manhattan on Union Square, became a real estate investor, and established a jewelry business with his brother.

Charles Dwight Yale's cousins were Samuel Yale Jr., who became a founding director of the Meriden National Bank, Henry Clay Yale, founder of Townsend & Yale, dry goods merchant, and Sarah S. Yale, wife of Senator Edgar Atwater, who was of the family of Senator Charles Atwater.

Both were Yale graduates, and Mrs. Yale's niece, Mary Atwater, married to Judge William G. Choate, founder of the Choate School For Boys, and family member of Ambassador Joseph H. Choate of the Naumkeag Estate, and of Congressman and Senator Rufus Choate, a founder of the Metropolitan Museum of Art.
