= Yalesville, Connecticut =

Yalesville
- Unincorporated community
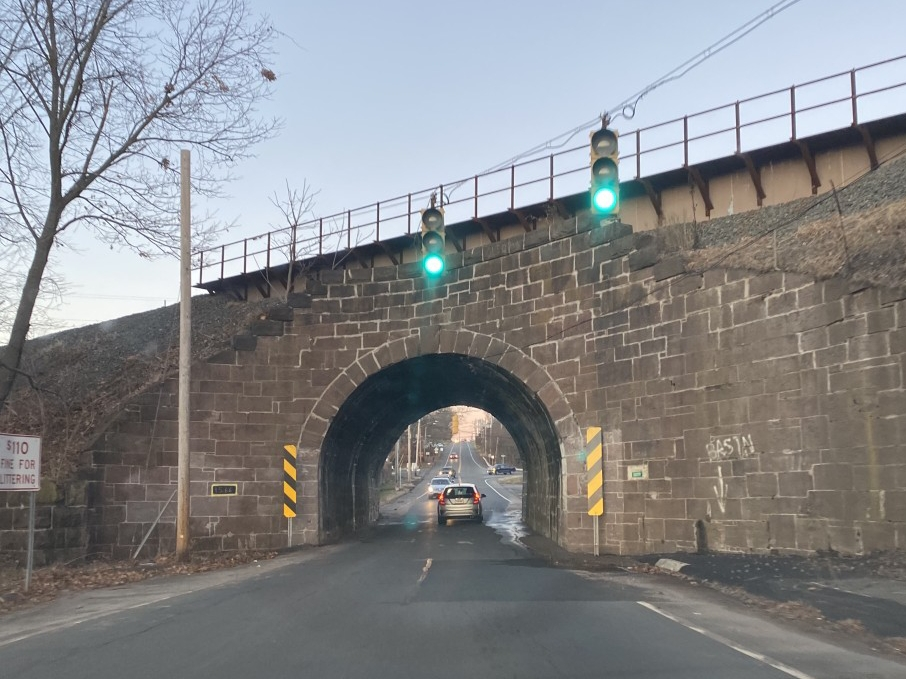

- Location within Connecticut Location within the United States
- Coordinates: 41°29′37″N 72°49′25″W
- Country: United States
- State: Connecticut
- County: New Haven
- Elevation: 95 ft (29 m)
- Time zone: UTC-5 (Eastern)
  - Summer (DST): UTC-4 (Eastern)
- GNIS feature ID: 212303

Yalesville is an unincorporated village in Wallingford, Connecticut, United States. The village was founded in 1677, and was originally called "First Falls". It was renamed Yalesville in 1808.

== History ==
A Committee to locate a mill at the first falls on the Quinnipiac River between Wallingford and Meriden was held in September 1686. In 1704 the mill was sold to William Tyler, and the community became known as Tyler's Mills. The mill and surrounding lands were sold to Charles Yale around a hundred years later, and the name of the village became Yalesville. He was the father of Senator Charles Dwight Yale, and a younger brother of merchant William Yale. The village was named in honor of the Yale family dynasty, who were pioneers in the manufacturing of Britannia Ware in the region.

Founded by Samuel Yale Sr. (1763–1810), their enterprises would evolve into the Meriden Britannia Company and the Simpson, Hall, Miller & Co., among many others. Their ancestors were the early settlers of Wallingford and descended from Thomas Yale of New Haven Colony, step-son of Governor Theophilus Eaton. Many members joined the American Revolutionary War, fighting at the Battle of Fort Washington and at Fort Lee, under General Nathanael Greene, and were captured as prisoners. They also enlisted in the Siege of Louisbourg (1745), the French and Indian War, the War of 1812, and the Spanish–American War.

In 1695, Yalesville residents grew tired of having to take a canoe across the river, so a bridge was built adjacent to the residence of Roswell Yale, in what is now Yalesville. In about 1800, the current bridge over the Quinnipiac River was built. At the same time, the first school was constructed in Yalesville. The Yalesville Elementary School, now named Mary Fritz Elementary School, is the second one built on the site.

== Geography ==
Yalesville is located in the northwestern portion of Wallingford, 10 miles from Wadsworth Falls State Park.

The Wharton Brook and the Quinnipiac River, also known as Dragon River, run through Yalesville.
