= Lurelle Guild =

American architect and designer (1898–1985)

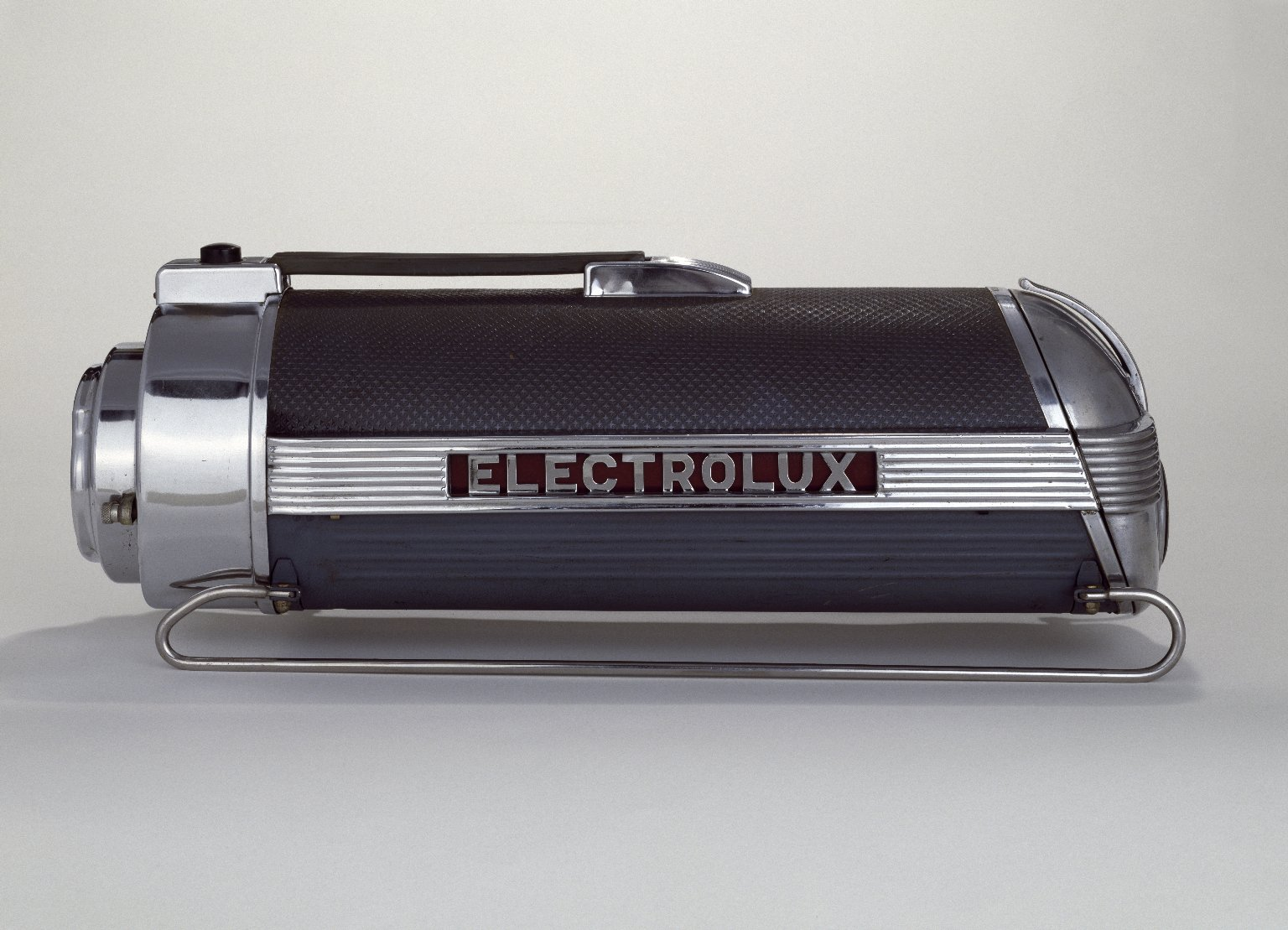
Lurelle Guild. Vacuum Cleaner, ca. 1937. Brooklyn Museum.

Lurelle Van Arsdale Guild (1898–1985) was an architect, industrial designer, and interior designer. Born in Syracuse, New York, Guild studied painting at Syracuse University, graduating in 1920. He initially worked as an illustrator and writer before founding Lurelle Guild Associates in 1928. In 1944, Guild became a founding member of the Society of Industrial Designers in New York.

Guild's clients included Alcoa, Aluminum Cooking Utensil Company, Chase Brass & Copper Company, Electrolux, Heywood-Wakefield, International Silver Company, Kensington, Inc., Pullman Company, Revlon, and the Scranton Lace Company.

== Background ==
Guild's designs are held in several museum collections. The Carnegie Museum of Art in Pittsburgh includes Guild designs for Kensington, Inc., such as platters, a sugar bowl, teapot, coffeepot, milk jug, and pitcher. The Marshall Johnson Collection of Cookware and Appliance Design Drawings at the Hagley Museum and Library in Greenville, Delaware, features drawings of Guild's Kensington Ware aluminum products (1922–1960).

The Yale University Art Gallery's collection includes Guild designs, including a canape plate and wine cooler for Chase Brass & Copper Company, the "Stratford" bowl for Kensington, Inc., a "Regency" asparagus platter, "His Royal Highness" coffee service, and "Chatham" pattern pitcher for International Silver Company, and the "Wear-ever" kettle for the Aluminum Cooking Utensil Company.

Guild's designs for International Silver Company are also included in the collections of the Cooper Hewitt, Smithsonian Design Museum, Dallas Museum of Art, Metropolitan Museum of Art, and Minneapolis Institute of Art. These works have been featured in exhibitions such as "American Modern, 1925–1940: Design for a New Age" (2001–02) and "Modernism in American Silver: 20th Century Design" (2005–07).

In 1934–35, Guild's designs for a cocktail shaker and vegetable dish were exhibited at the Metropolitan Museum of Art.

== Personal life ==
Lurelle Guild married Anne Louise Eden in 1929; they had one daughter.
