= Tuttle House =

Tuttle House may refer to:

in the United States (by state then city)

- Bronson B. Tuttle House, Naugatuck, Connecticut, listed on the NRHP in Connecticut
- Bishop Daniel S. Tuttle House, Boise, Idaho, listed on the NRHP in Idaho
- Columbus Tuttle House, Lapeer, Michigan, listed on the NRHP in Michigan
- Tuttle House, Ipswich, Massachusetts
- Donald D. Tuttle House, Concord, New Hampshire, listed on the NRHP
- David Tuttle Cooperage, Dover, New Jersey, listed on the NRHP in New Jersey
- Tuttle House (Whippany, New Jersey), listed on the NRHP in New Jersey
- Newman Tuttle House, Lacona, New York, listed on the NRHP in New York
- Tuttle House (Fredericktown, Ohio), listed on the NRHP in Ohio
- Tuttle-Folsom House, Manti, Utah, listed on the NRHP in Utah
- A. G. Tuttle Estate, Baraboo, Wisconsin, listed on the NRHP in Wisconsin
