= Comet Tuttle =

Comet Tuttle may mean:

- 8P/Tuttle (a.k.a. 8P/1790 A2, 1790 II, 8P/1858 A1, 1858 I, 8P/1871 T1, 1871 III, 1871d, 1885 IV, 1885b, 1899 III, 1899b, 1912 IV, 1912b, 1926 IV, 1926a, 1939 X, 1939k, 1967 V, 1967a, 1980 XIII, 1980h, 1994 XV, 1992r)
- Either of these long-period comets:
  - C/1858 R1 (a.k.a. 1858 VII)
  - C/1861 Y1 (a.k.a. 1861 III) and has been associated as a candidate for the Delta Normid meteor shower in February.
- A partial reference to these other comets:
  - 109P/Swift-Tuttle (a.k.a. 109P/-68 Q1, 109P/188 O1, 109P/1737 N1, 1737 II, 109P/1862 O1, 1862 III, 109P/1992 S2, 1992 XXVIII, 1992t)
  - 55P/Tempel-Tuttle (a.k.a. 55P/1366 U1, 55P/1699 U1, 1699 II, 55P/1865 Y1, 1866 I, 55P/1965 M2, 1965 IV, 1965i, 55P/1997 E1)
  - 41P/Tuttle-Giacobini-Kresák (a.k.a. 41P/1858 J1, 1858 III, 41P/1907 L1, 1907 III, 1907c, 41P/1951 H1, 1951 IV, 1951f, 1962 V, 1962b, 1973 VI, 1973b, 1978 XXV, 1978r, 1990 II, 1989b1)
