= International Silver Company =

American corporation based in Connecticut

- Founded: 1898; 128 years ago
- Defunct: 1981 (stopped manufacturing)
- Successor: International Silver, Ltd.
- Headquarters: Meriden, Connecticut, U.S.
- Area served: Internationally
- Products: Silver products, hollowware, flatware, and cutlery

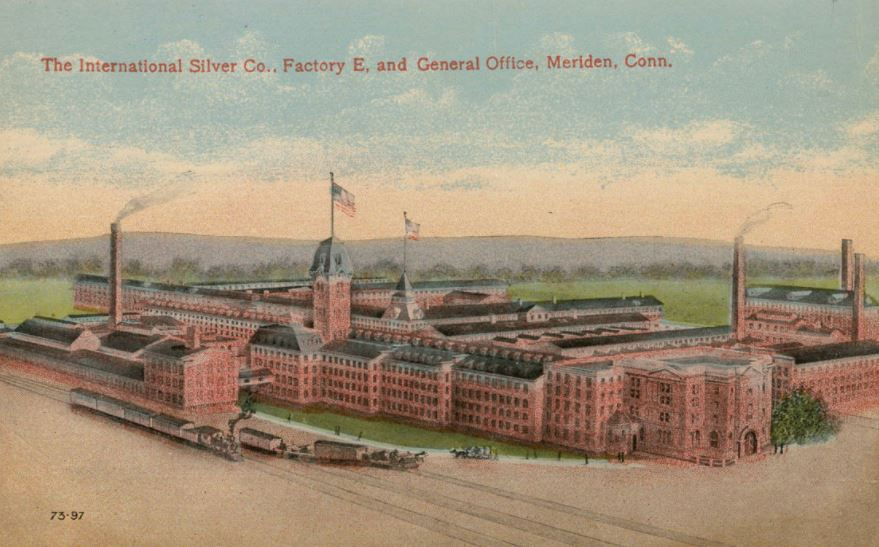
International Silver Company, General Office, Meriden, Connecticut

The International Silver Company (1898–1983, stopped making silver), later known as Insilco Corporation and also known as the ISC, was formed in Meriden, Connecticut as a corporation banding together many existing silver companies in the immediate area and beyond.

== Formation of the International Silver Company ==
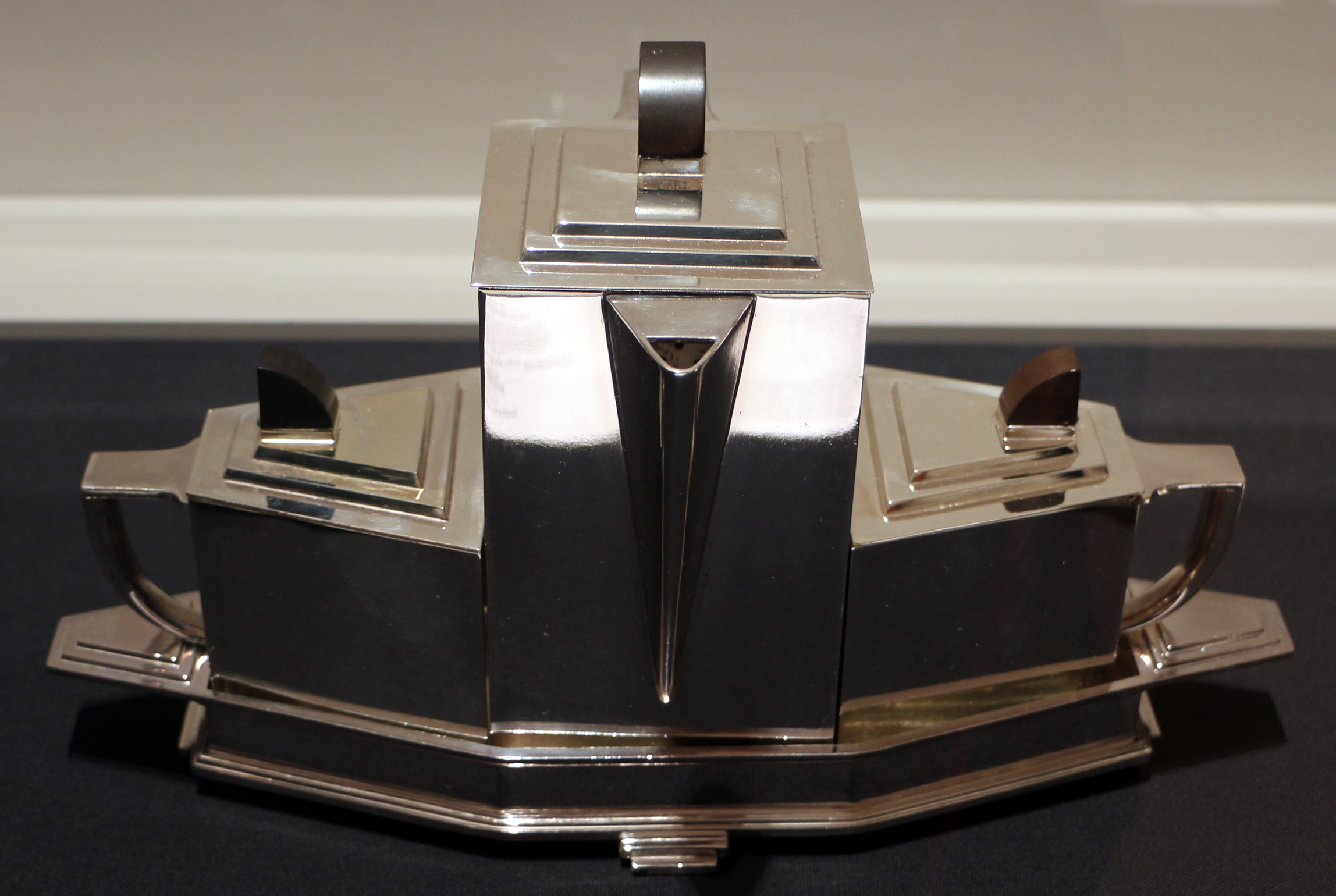
Design by Jean G. Theobald for Wilcox Silver Plate Co. / International Silver Company, (1928).

In Meriden and nearby Wallingford and Middletown, the companies that were banded together to form the International Silver Company included these companies: Meriden Britannia Company, Meriden Silver Plate Co., Middletown Plate Company, C. Rogers & Brother, Simpson, Hall, Miller & Co., Simpson Nickel Company, Watrous Manufacturing Company, and the Wilcox Silver Plate Co. In Hartford, the following silver companies also became part of the corporation: Barbour Silver Company, Rogers Cutlery, and William Rogers Manufacturing Company. Other Connecticut companies that became part of the corporation also include Holmes & Edwards Silver Company in Bridgeport; Derby Silver Company in Derby; Norwich Cutlery in Norwich; Rogers and Brothers, and Rogers and Hamilton in Waterbury.

From outside New England were Manhattan Silver Plate in Lyons, New York; and Standard Silver Company, Ltd. in Toronto, Ontario, Canada. Into the 20th century, many silver designs carried either the International Silver Company brand, the pre-existing brand, or both were listed as the design maker.

A founding member of the company was Senator Charles Dwight Yale, nephew of merchant William Yale, and member of the Yale family.

== ISC Silver Theater and product endorsements by Hollywood actresses ==
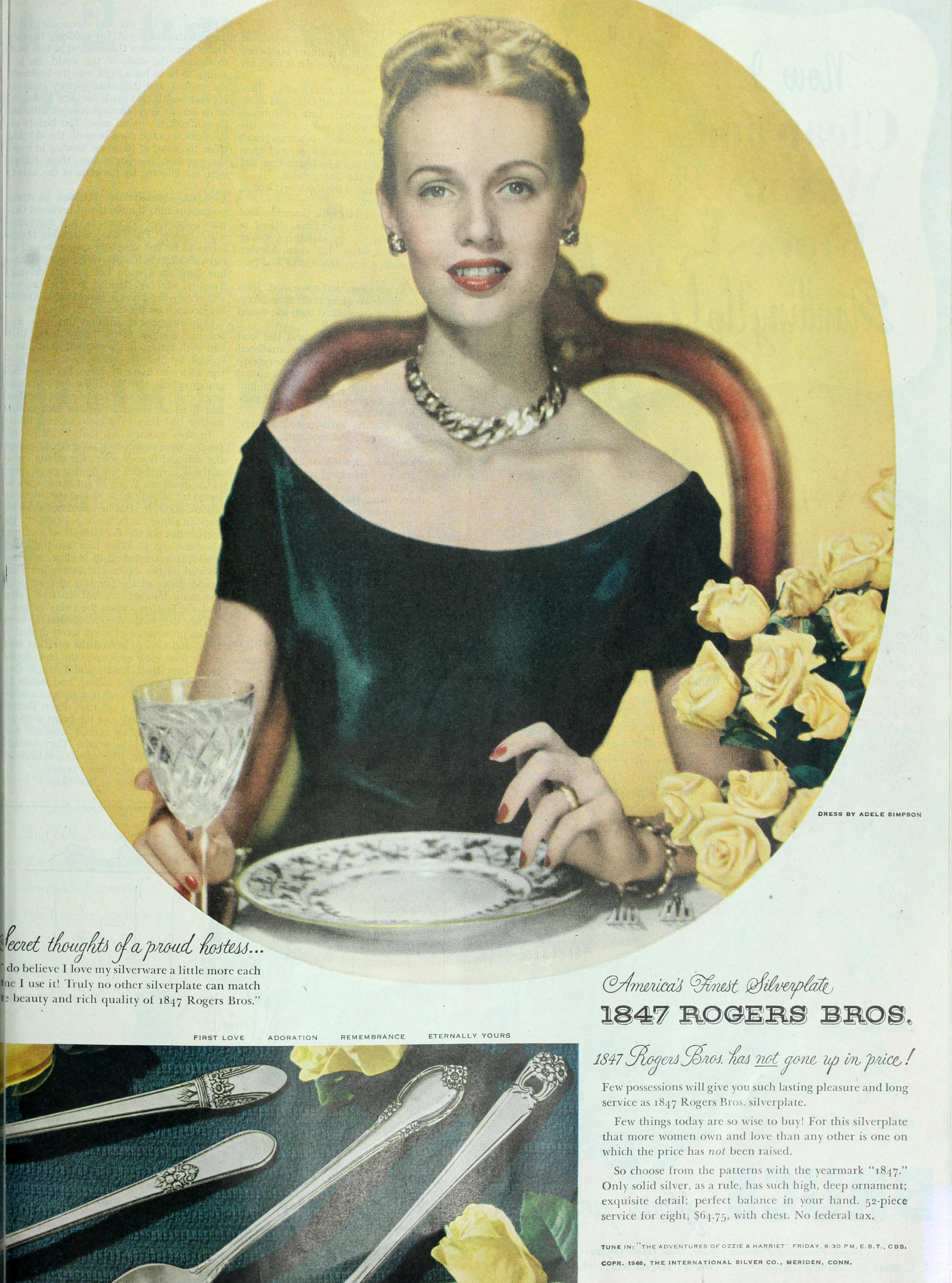
International Silver Co. / 1847 Rogers Bros. silverware advertisement in Ladies' Home Journal (1948), with co-promotion of fashion and The Adventures of Ozzie and Harriet show.

Starting in the late 1930s, ISC sponsored the Silver Theater, a radio program in Hollywood featuring many stars of the era and was broadcast on CBS radio. In parallel, print advertisements in LIFE and other magazines starting in 1937 featured product endorsements for ISC / 1847 Rogers Bros. silverware by several Hollywood movie actresses including Anne Baxter, Constance Bennett, Janet Blair, Virginia Bruce, Madeleine Carroll, Claudette Colbert, Joan Crawford, Linda Darnell, Olivia de Havilland, Laraine Day, Geraldine Fitzgerald, Joan Fontaine, Kay Francis, Judy Garland, Greer Garson, Paulette Goddard, Susan Howard, Veronica Lake, Carole Lombard, Myrna Loy, Mary Martin, Merle Oberon, Gail Patrick, Ginger Rogers, Shirley Ross, Rosalind Russell, Martha Scott, Ann Sheridan, Dinah Shore, Barbara Stanwyck, Risë Stevens, and Loretta Young. Actor Conrad Nagel was the show's presenter.

In 1949–50, the program continued on CBS television as The Silver Theatre.

== ISC designs in museum collections and exhibitions ==
International Silver Company designs have been collected by many museums across the United States, including the Dallas Museum of Art, the Metropolitan Museum of Art in New York, the Art Institute of Chicago, the High Museum of Art in Atlanta, etc. Museums overseas that have collected ISC designs include the British Museum in London.

International Silver Company designs have been exhibited in numerous museum exhibitions in the United States and abroad. For example, ISC was represented at several Metropolitan Museum of Art exhibitions during the late 1920s and 1930s, including "The Architect and the Industrial Arts: An Exhibition of Contemporary American Design" (1929). ISC is particularly known in the museum world for its high-quality Modernist designs from 1928 into the 1960s, which were exhibited at the Dallas Museum of Art, the Smithsonian Institution in Washington, DC, and the Wolfsonian in Miami Beach, Florida in 2005–07. This exhibition highlighted many ISC design achievements, including its installation called the "Moon Room" exhibited in the Pavilion of American Interiors at the 1964 New York World's Fair from 1964 to 1965.

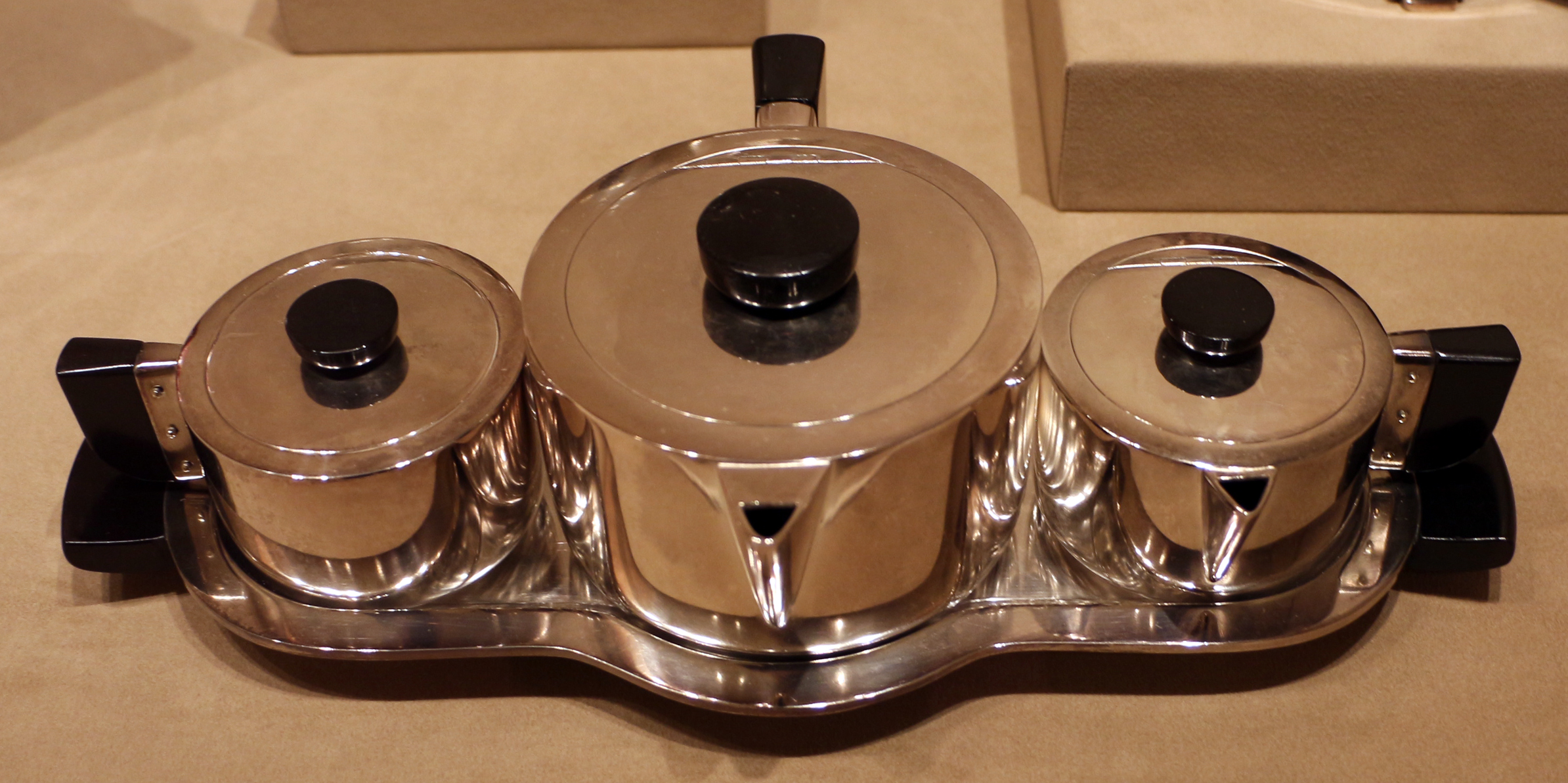
Design by Jean G. Theobald and Virginia Hamill for Wilcox Silver Plate Co. / International Silver Company, (1928).

One of the most exhibited ISC design objects is the space-age-looking urn designed by Eliel Saarinen (1934) for Wilcox Silver Plate Co. / International Silver Company. The urn was exhibited in the exhibition St. Louis Modern (2015–16) and Cranbrook Goes to the Movies: Films and Their Objects, 1925–1975 (2014–15). Saarinen's urn has become a 20th-century Modern design icon.

== Designers designing ISC products over the years ==
Over the years, several designers have made modernist designs for the International Silver Company that are now in museum collections. These designers include Edward S. Buchko, Edward J. Conroy, Kurt Eric Christoffersen, Robert L. Doerfler, Lurelle Guild, Virginia Hamill, Lilian V. M. Helander, Garth Huxtable, Robert J. King, Alfred G. Kintz, Alphonse La Paglia, Paul Lobel, Eliel Saarinen, Curtis Rittberg, Frederick W. Stark, Jean Theobald, and Stuart A. Young.

== International Silver, Ltd. ==
International Silver, Ltd.
- Industry: Precious metals, minting coins, precious metals bullion bars, mint
- Predecessor: International Silver Company
- Headquarters: United States
- Area served: Internationally
- Key people: Charles L. Long Chairman, Leslie D. Long, President, Larry K. Hovater Secretary / Treasurer
- Products: Silver products, silver bars, gold bars, platinum bars, mint 1-ounce silver .999 and .925 coins and bars
- Revenue: $150,000,000 Annual includes mining, refining, and trading
- Total equity: $250,000,000
- Owner: Long Family
- Number of employees: 100

In 1979, International Silver, Ltd. (Traded as "ISLOTC" on the Vancouver Stock Exchange, and traded on the OTC market in the United States.) was created to bring the dormant International Silver Company back from a group of licenses, hallmarks, and other assets into a trading company with buying centers for scrap precious metals in Cookeville, Tennessee, Waco, Texas, and Las Vegas, Nevada, a refinery operation was opened in Scottsdale, Arizona and mining purchase operations in Tucson, Arizona and Lake Tahoe, California. The firm also owned and operated a precious metals trading operation in Scottsdale, with a seat that took delivery of silver bullion and silver coin contracts off of the Chicago Mercantile Exchange, The Mid America Commodity Exchange and COMEX in New York City.

Charles L. Long and Leslie D. Long were the chairman and president of the new operation, while Larry Hovater was Secretary/Treasurer. At the height of the 1979-1980 silver boom, which traded above $50.00 per ounce, the firm purchased $2M weekly in scrap, 1000-ounce delivery bars, and contracts for 90% silver coins. The firm also traded $1M to $5M weekly in precious metals contracts, with delivery primarily in Chicago. The Floor Trader for these contracts was Long brother Larry E. Long.

== Closure ==
The Connecticut plant was closed in 1981, and liquidation was completed in 1983.
