= Tuttle Silver Company =

Tuttle Silver Company 1890

Boston, Massachusetts. formed by

Timothy Tuttle."

Timothy Tuttle formed the Tuttle Silver Company in 1890, in downtown Boston, Massachusetts.

His first work was to duplicate sterling pieces by special order. And because the pieces he duplicated were generally English sterling pieces, the original Tuttle pieces are dated in the English custom, with the crest of the reigning monarch of the times, to indicate the time period.

What makes Tuttle sterling pieces different and unique, is the fact that beginning in the 1920s, during the term of president Calvin Coolidge, - in order to indicate the time period the pieces were produced - he changed the marks, to what is referred to as presidential marks.

The presidential marks consist of a crescent containing the initials of the incumbent President of the United States, starting with CC in the term of Coolidge, and following with HH in the term of Herbert Hoover and so on.

Under the crescent is a Roman numeral, which may indicate, either in what term of the presidency it was produced, or - by some accounts – it stands for the exact year of the presidency it was produced.

Over the crescent, the mark contains a Pine tree, this is another patriotic symbol, as it is the same mark, as the pine tree shilling the fourth and most famous of the earliest American coins, from the New England era.

In 1958 the Tuttle Silver Company was purchased by Wallace Silversmiths, which was in 1986 itself purchased by Syratech Corporation both brands Tuttle and Wallace are now under the ownership of Lifetime Brands.
