= Wilcox Silver Plate Co. =

- Founded: 1865; 161 years ago
- Headquarters: Meriden, Connecticut, United States
- Area served: U.S. and to some extent international
- Key people: Jedediah Wilcox, founder
- Products: silver products, hollowware and flatware

The Wilcox Silver Plate Co. (1867-c. 1980) was formed in Meriden, Connecticut. From 1865 to 1867, it was known as the Wilcox Brittania Co. In 1898, the company was acquired by the International Silver Company, headquartered in Meriden. After the acquisition, the Wilcox Silver Plate Co. brand continued until at least c. 1980.

Wilcox Silver Plate Co. designs are in several museum collections including the Art Institute of Chicago; British Museum in London; Brooklyn Museum; Cranbrook Art Museum, Bloomfield Hills, MI; Dallas Museum of Art; High Museum of Art, Atlanta; Los Angeles County Museum of Art; Metropolitan Museum of Art; Minneapolis Institute of Art; Mint Museum, Charlotte, NC; Newark Museum, NJ; New Orleans Museum of Art; Philadelphia Museum of Art, St. Louis Art Museum; Wolfsonian-FIU in Miami Beach; and Yale University Art Gallery in New Haven, CT.

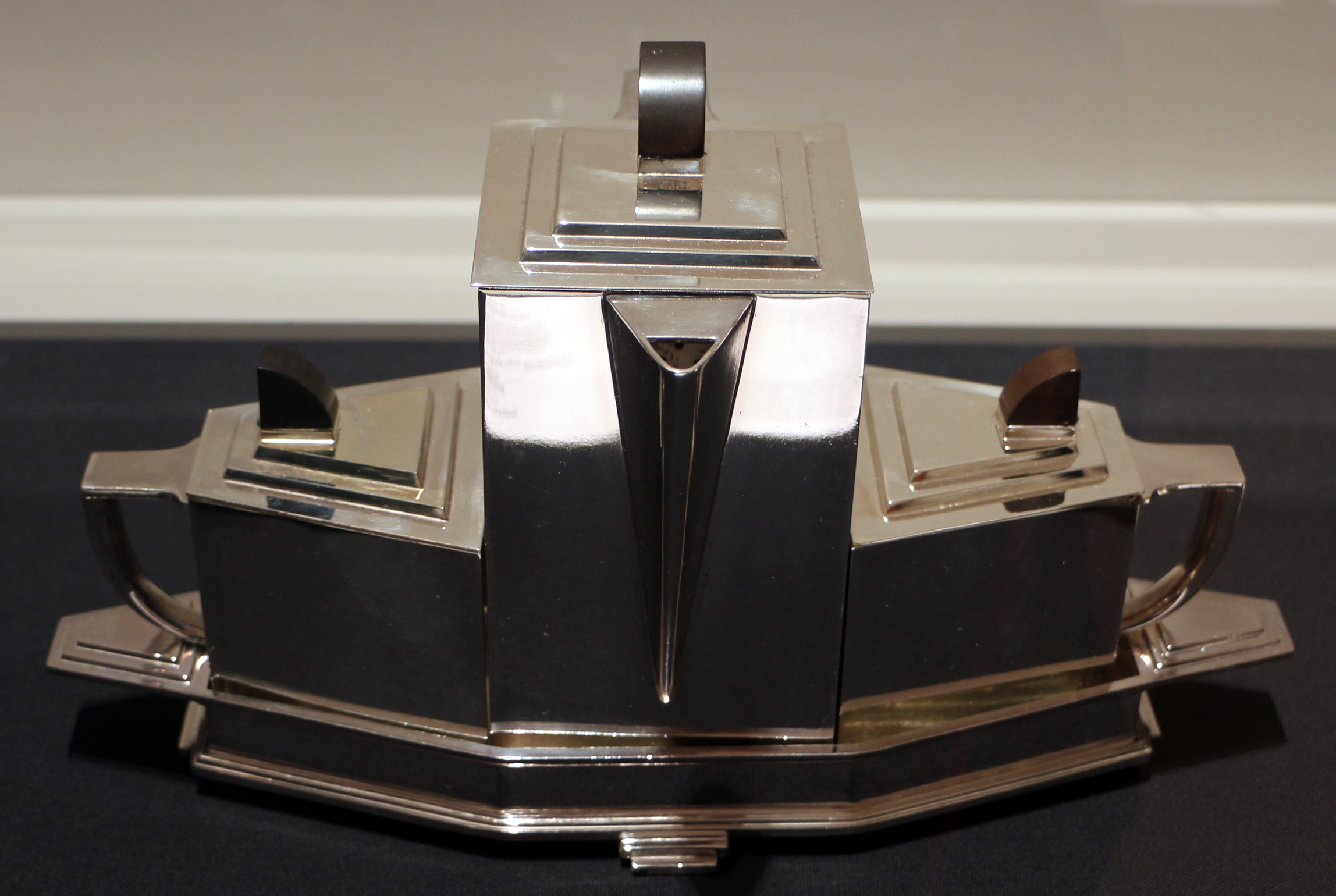
Design by Jean G. Theobald for Wilcox Silver Plate Co. / International Silver Company, (1928).

Over the years, Wilcox Silver Plate Co. designs have been exhibited in several museum exhibitions in the United States and beyond since at least 1934. In 2005–07, designs were included in the touring exhibition Modernism in American Silver: 20th-Century Design, organized by the Dallas Museum of Art, which also travelled to the Smithsonian Institution in Washington, DC.

One of the most exhibited Wilcox Silver Plate Co. / International Silver Company designs is the space-age looking urn designed by Eliel Saarinen (1934). The urn was exhibited in St. Louis Modern (2015–16) and Cranbrook Goes to the Movies: Films and Their Objects, 1925–1975 (2014–15).

On June 11, 2014, a Paul Lobel-design tea set for Wilcox Silver Plate Co. sold for US$377,000 at auction at Sotheby's in New York.

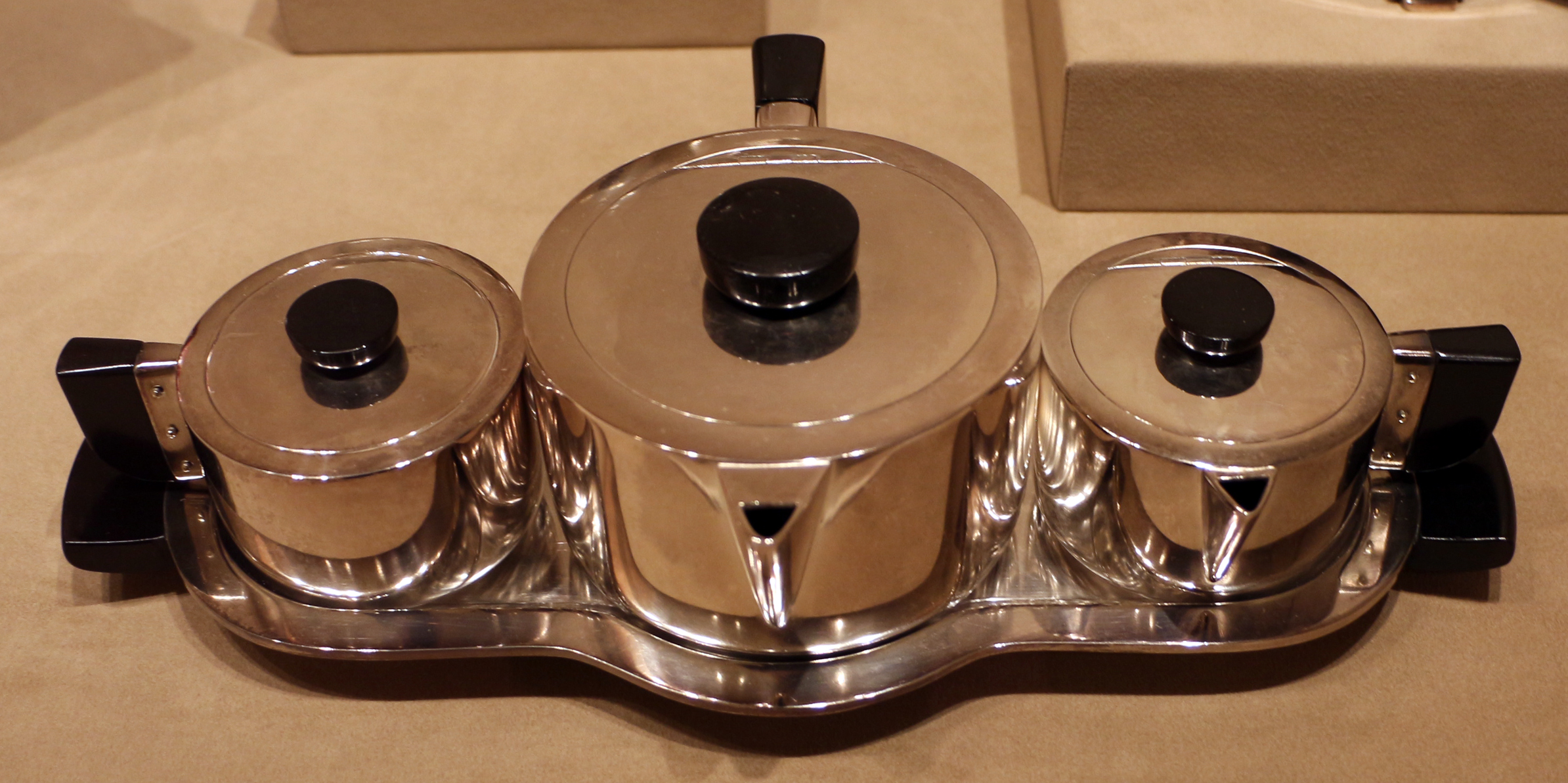
Design by Jean G. Theobald and Virginia Hamill for Wilcox Silver Plate Co. / International Silver Company, (1928).
