= Tuttle-Folsom House =

- U.S. National Register of Historic Places
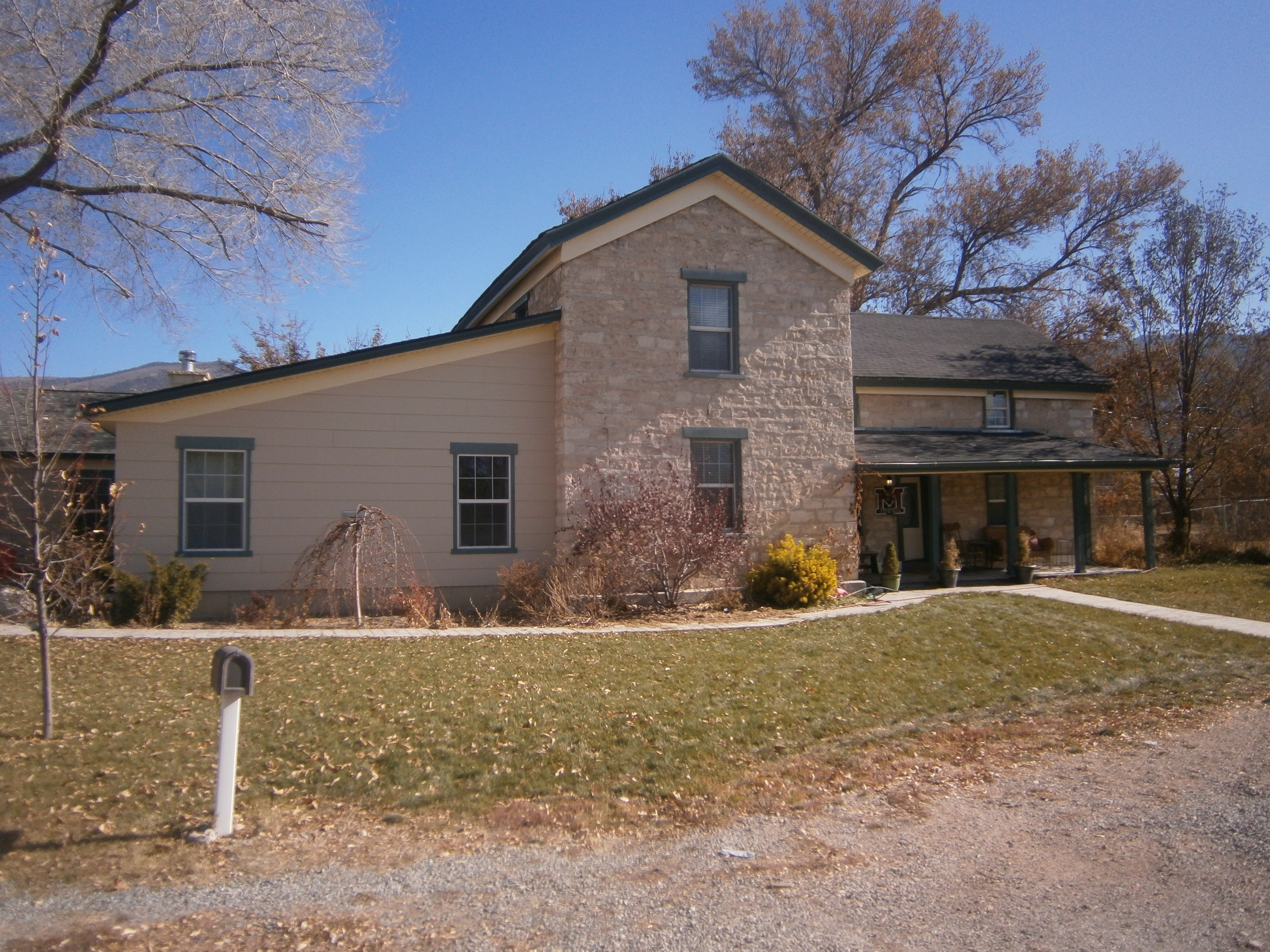

- Location within Utah Location within the United States
- Location: 195 West 300 North, Manti, Utah
- Coordinates: 39.269464°N 111.640459°W
- Area: less than one acre
- Built: 1850
- NRHP reference No.: 77001316
- Added to NRHP: July 21, 1977

The Tuttle-Folsom House is a historic house in Manti, Utah. It was built in 1850, and later acquired by Luther T. Tuttle, the mayor of Manti who was also " a leading merchant, banker, livestock raiser and served four terms as a territorial legislator." From 1880 to 1890, it belonged to architect William H. Folsom, who designed the Manti Utah Temple among many other buildings, followed by John C. Witbeck and John E. Metcalf. It has been listed on the National Register of Historic Places since July 21, 1977.

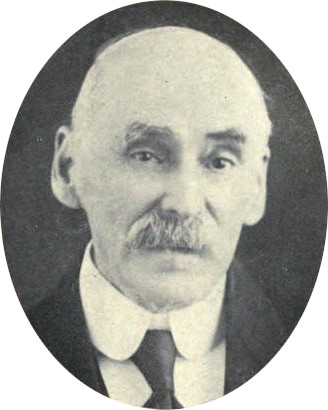
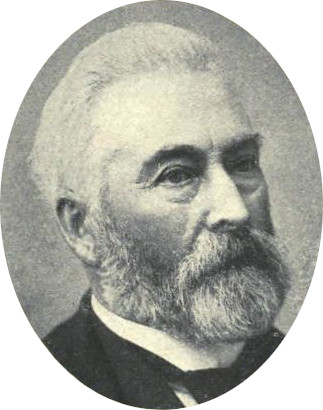
Luther T. Tuttle (left) and William H. Folsom (right) each owned the house at one time

It has an early stone saltbox-type addition, with same cornice detail as in the original portion of the house. There is only a minor break in the roofline, but an obvious break in the stonework of the abutting walls, with just a few interlocking stones.

It is located at 195 W. 300 North, at the southeast corner of N. 200 West. A large addition was added on the north side of the house in 2012.
