= Fulton Street (Manhattan) =

Street in Manhattan, New York

Coordinates: 40°42′36″N 74°00′26″W

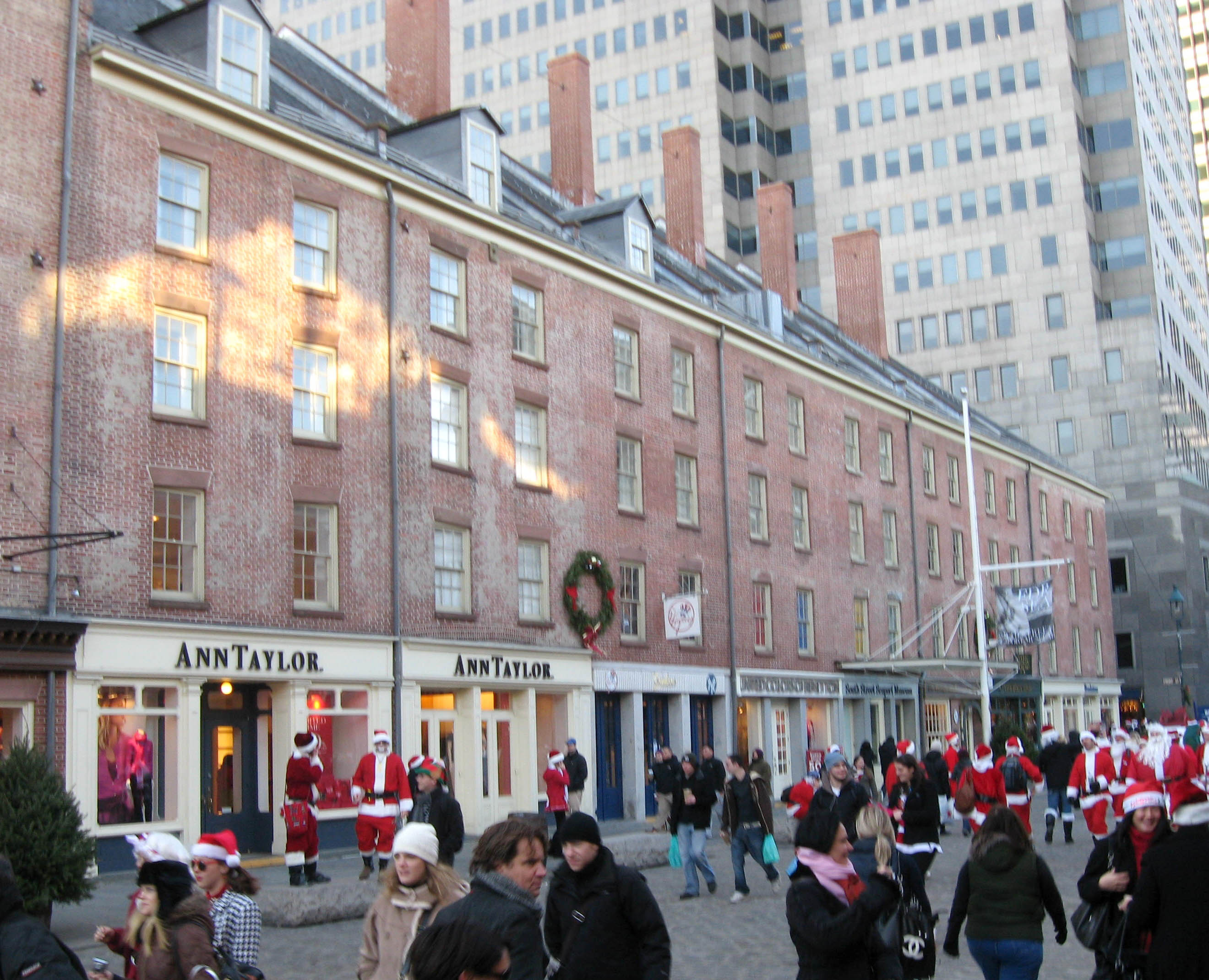
The South Street Seaport on Fulton Street on a December afternoon

Fulton Street is a busy street located in Lower Manhattan in New York City. Located in the Financial District, a few blocks north of Wall Street, it runs from West Street at the site of the World Trade Center to South Street, terminating in front of the South Street Seaport. The westernmost two blocks and the easternmost block are pedestrian streets.

The street has a Beaux-Arts architectural feel with many buildings dating back to the Gilded Age or shortly thereafter. The early 19th-century buildings on the south side of the easternmost block are called Schermerhorn Row and are collectively listed on the National Register of Historic Places.

== History ==
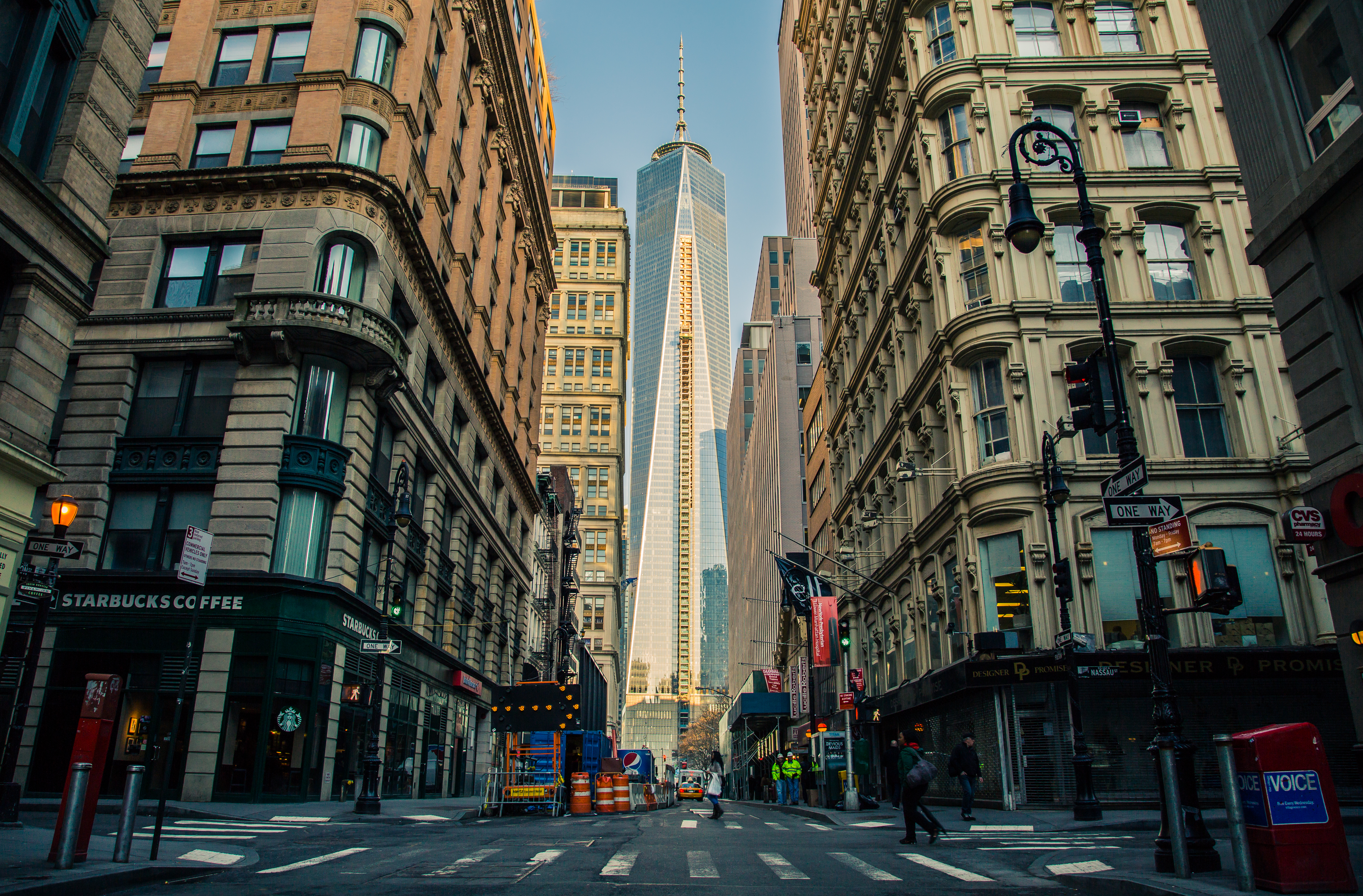
Modern day Fulton Street

Regular cricket matches were held near the present Fulton Market in 1780 when the British Army based itself in Manhattan during the American Revolution.

The street itself was originally broken up into two parts, divided at Broadway. The eastern half was Fair Street and the western half was Partition Street. In 1816, both streets were named Fulton, in honor of Robert Fulton, an engineer who became famous for his invention of the steamship in 1809. East River ferries connected this street to Fulton Street in Brooklyn, at Brooklyn Ferry at the time, Fulton Street, counting the ferry, was one continuous street from Manhattan to Brooklyn, beginning in Manhattan, traveling across the ferry, and along what is today Old Fulton Street, Cadman Plaza West, and what is now a pedestrian esplanade on the east side of the Brooklyn Borough Hall.

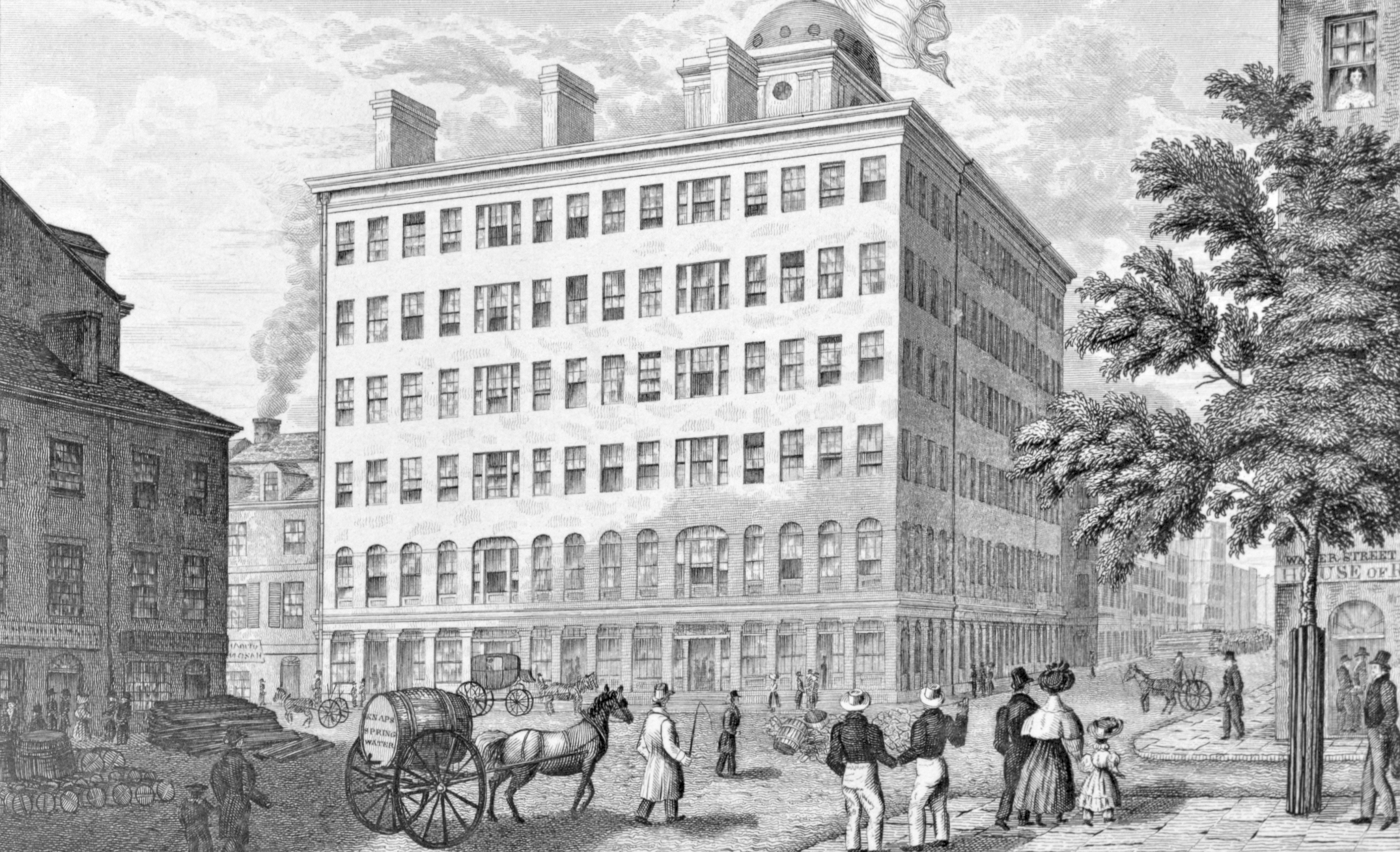
US Hotel (Holt's Hotel), Fulton Street, largest hotel in America in the 1830s, competitor of Astor House of John Jacob Astor, was owned by Gen. Edwin R. Yale of the Yale family

The Fulton Fish Market was located nearby at the South Street Seaport until 2005, when it moved to Hunts Point in the Bronx.

In August 2013, parts of the street were excavated in order to install water mains, but while they were digging, construction workers uncovered over 100 empty liquor bottles from the 18th century used as part of landfill to extend the street to the East River.

== Public transportation ==
Fulton Street is served by the 2, 3, 4, 5, A, C, J, and Z trains at the Fulton Street subway station. The Fulton Center renovation project for the station was completed in November 2014.

No bus route runs on Fulton Street. The two routes intersecting with the street are the M15 and M15 SBS at Pearl/Water Streets, and the M55 at Church Street uptown or Broadway downtown.
