= Simpson, Hall, Miller & Co. =

Silver and cutlery manufacturer

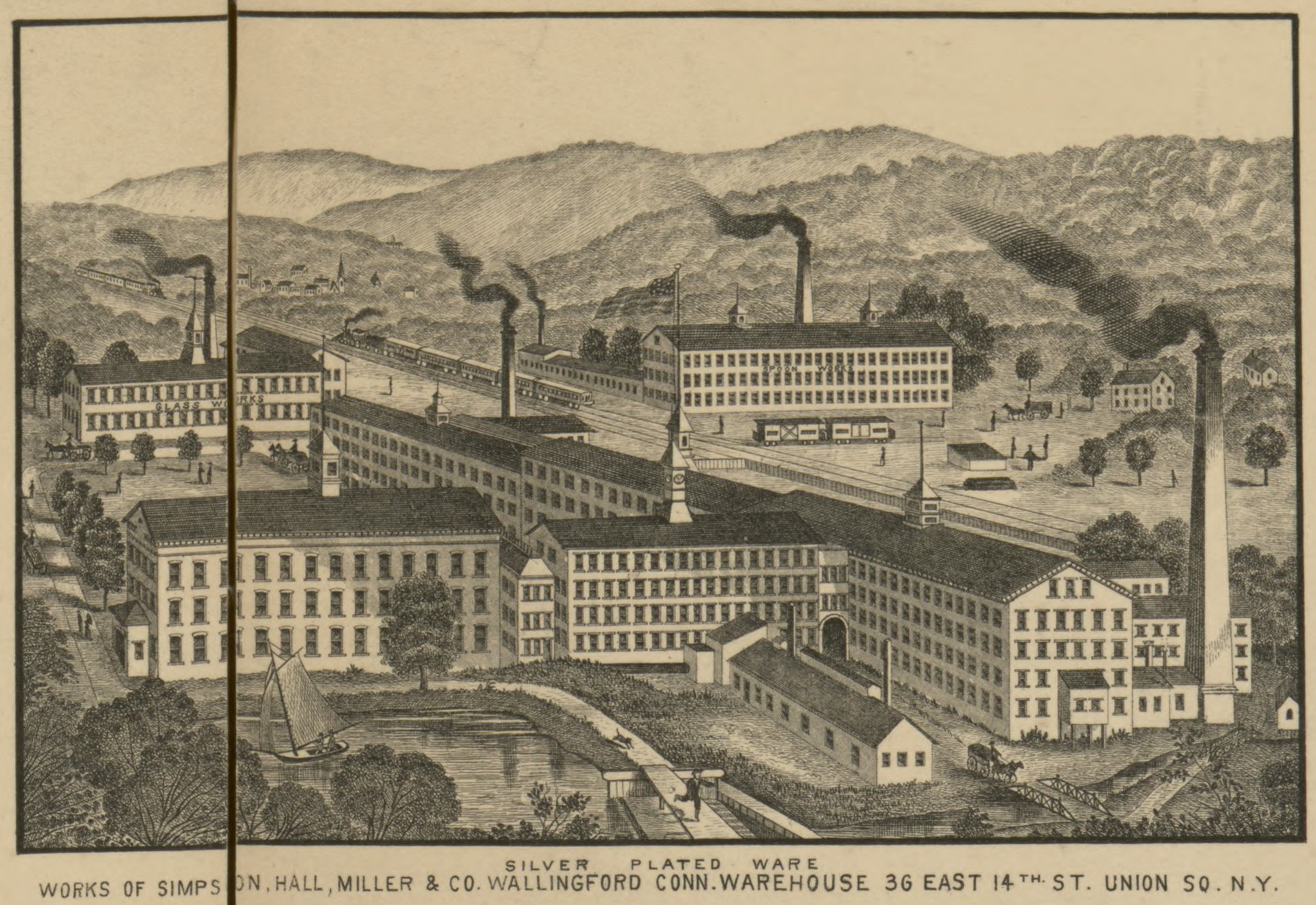
- Wallingford works in 1879
- Founded: 1866; 160 years ago
- Fate: In 1898 became part of the International Silver Company; continued operating with the Simpson, Hall, Miller & Co. brand
- Headquarters: Wallingford, Connecticut, United States
- Area served: Predominately the United States but also internationally
- Key people: Samuel Simpson
- Products: cutlery, hollowware

Simpson, Hall, Miller & Co. was a cutlery and silver hollowware manufacturer in Wallingford, Connecticut, founded in 1866. By c. 1895, the company operated large factories in Wallingford and Montreal, Canada.

In 1898, Simpson, Hall, Miller & Co. became part of the International Silver Company headquartered in neighboring Meriden. A notable shareholder was Senator Charles Dwight Yale, nephew of merchant William Yale.

Many designs have been collected by many American museums including the Dallas Museum of Art, Philadelphia Museum of Art, and Yale University Art Gallery. In 2005-07, Modernist silver designs by Simpson, Hall, Miller & Co. were featured in a traveling museum exhibition (Dallas, Washington, Miami Beach, Reno and Memphis).

The designs have been exhibited since the 1876 Philadelphia Centennial Exhibition. In 1880-81, Simpson, Hall, Miller & Co. was awarded the First Prize Medal competing with 44 other silver manufacturers from the United States and Europe at the Melbourne International Exhibition in Australia.
