= Meriden Britannia Company =

American silverware manufacturer, 1852–1898

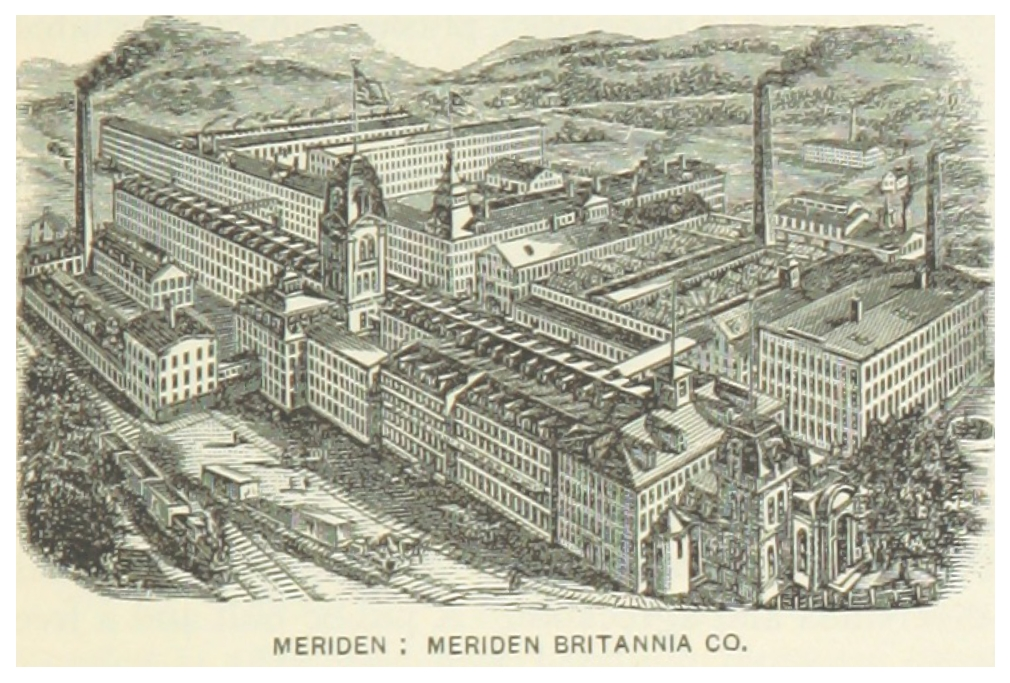
- Founded: 1852; 174 years ago
- Founders: Isaac C. Lewis, L.J. Curtis, W.W. Lyman, Horace Wilcox
- Fate: 1898, became part of the International Silver Company
- Headquarters: Meriden, Connecticut, United States
- Area served: Internationally
- Key people: Isaac C. Lewis, L.J. Curtis, W.W. Lyman, Horace Wilcox, George R. Curtis, Dennis C. Wilcox
- Products: silver products, hollowware and flatware

The Meriden Britannia Company was formed in 1852 in Meriden, Connecticut, as a manufacturing company focused on producing wares in britannia metal. It became, for a time, the largest silverware company in the world.

By 1876, the Meriden Britannia Company had grown a great deal and the company made significant efforts at the Centennial Exposition in Philadelphia in that year. The company won the First Place medal for plated wares. According to Sotheby's in New York, "The publicity of the award and the impression the firm made on the fair's 8 million visitors was continued by the catalogues and other intensive marketing; by the end of the 1870s Meriden Britannia Co. was considered the largest silverware company in the world."

By 1891, Meriden Britannia had warerooms in New York (46 East 14th Street, Union Square); Chicago (47 State Street); San Francisco (134 Sutter Street); London, England (7 Cripplegate Buildings, Wood Street, E.C.); and Paris, France (26 Avenue de l'Opéra). The main factories were in Meriden and a branch factory was in Hamilton, Ontario, Canada.

By 1893, the company had expanded production with its floor surface covering over eight acres of space in downtown Meriden.

In 1898, the Meriden Britannia Company became part of the larger International Silver Company corporation headquartered in Meriden. Afterwards, while part of ISC, many designs were produced under the Meriden Britannia brand with design trade catalogues specifying Meriden Britannia wares.

Meriden Britannia Company designs are included in many museum collections, including the Brooklyn Museum, New York; Dallas Museum of Art; Davis Museum at Wellesley College, MA; Jewish Museum (Manhattan), New York; Wadsworth Atheneum, Hartford, CT; Mint Museum, Charlotte, NC; Victoria and Albert Museum, London, England; Wolfsonian-FIU, Miami Beach, FL; Yale University Art Gallery, New Haven, CT.

Recent museum exhibitions featuring Meriden Britannia designs include Life, liberty, and the pursuit of happiness (2008–12) at the Yale University Art Gallery, and travelled to Louisville, KY; Seattle, WA; and Birmingham, AL. In 1994-95, Meriden Britannia was included in the Dallas Museum of Art's Silver in America, 1840-1940: A century of splendor exhibition, and in 1986-87 at the Metropolitan Museum of Art's exhibition In pursuit of beauty: Americans and the Aesthetic Movement. In 1985, Meriden Britannia was included in a special exhibition at the Palace of Ajuda, Lisbon, Portugal, which was organized on the occasion of U.S. President Ronald Reagan and the First Lady's visit to the city.
