= Lamberton =

Lamberton may refer to:

== People with the surname Lamberton ==
- Alexander B. Lamberton (1839–1919), American politician and conservationist
- Benjamin P. Lamberton (1844–1912), admiral
- Charles Lamberton (1876–1960), fl. 1912–1956, French zoologist
- Charlotte Lamberton (born 1917), American deaf vaudeville and ballroom dancer
- Donald Lamberton (1927–2014), Australian economist
- George Lamberton (footballer) (1880–1954), English footballer
- Jaap Lamberton, Dutch comics artist
- James Lamberton (1877–1929), English footballer
- Ken Lamberton (born 1958), American writer and former teacher
- Robert Lamberton (judge) (1809–1885), Venango County Judge and founder of the Lamberton Savings Bank, Franklin, Pennsylvania
- Robert D. Lamberton, classics scholar, poet, and translator of ancient and contemporary literature
- Robert Eneas Lamberton (1886–1941), American politician
- Thierry Lamberton (born 1966), French ice speed skater
- William de Lamberton (died 1328), 13th century bishop

== Places ==
=== United Kingdom ===
- Lamberton, Scottish Borders, Scotland
- Lambroughton in North Ayrshire, Scotland (alternative spelling of Lamberton)

=== United States ===
- Lamberton, Minnesota
- Lamberton Township, Redwood County, Minnesota
- Lamberton, New Jersey
- Lamberton, West Virginia
- Lamberton Lake, Michigan
