= Nathaniel Turner (captain) =

Colonial Massachusetts militia officer

State Representative to the General Court of Massachusetts Bay Colony
- In office c.1633–1646

Magistrate in New Haven Colony
- In office c.1638–1646

Constable of Lynn, Massachusetts
- In office c.1632–c.1636

Personal details
- Born: c.1595 London, Kingdom of England
- Died: 1646 (lost at sea) Atlantic Ocean aboard the Phantom Ship
- Spouse: Margaret Leachland
- Children: Mary, Nathaniel, Rebecca, Abigail, Hannah, Isaac
- Occupation: Merchant, Settler, Militia Officer, Magistrate
- Known for: Early New England settler; and Phantom Ship crew member

Military service
- Rank: Captain
- Battles/wars: Pequot War

Captain Nathaniel Turner was an English colonist of New England in the seventeenth century. He was an early colonist of New Haven, Connecticut and served in the Pequot War. He disappeared aboard the Ghost ship of New Haven, as the ship was never seen again.

== Early life ==
Nathaniel Turner was born in 1595 in London, England and was trained as a merchant from a young age. He married Margaret Leachland in the 1620s and moved to New England in 1630 aboard the Arbella. He settled in Lynn, Massachusetts and quickly began taking civic and military roles in the community, such as Constable.

== Later life and disappearance ==
In 1638, Turner joined the initial migration to New Haven Connecticut, led by John Davenport (minister) and Theophilus Eaton. He continued serving in civic and military roles, until his disappearance in 1646, when the ship he was aboard vanished, presumably lost at sea.

== Legacy ==
His daughter Mary Turner married Captain Thomas Yale. His ships disappearance was told in the 1858 Henry Wadsworth Longfellow poem "The Phantom Ship".
