= Fundamental Agreement of the New Haven Colony =

1639 legal document

The Fundamental Agreement of the New Haven Colony was signed on June 4, 1639. The free planters (founders of the New Haven Colony) who assented to the agreement are listed below:

- William Andrews
- Richard Beach
- Richard Beckley
- John Benham
- Jarvis Boykin
- John Brockett
- William Browning
- John Budd
- John Chapmen
- John Charles
- Ezekiel Cheever
- James Clark
- John Clarke
- John Cogswell
- John Cooper
- Jasper Crane
- John Davenport
- Jeremiah Dixion
- Samuel Eaton
- Theophilus Eaton
- Nicholas Elsey
- Timothy Ford
- Thomas Fugill
- Matthew Gilbert
- Francis Hall
- Matthias Hitchcock
- Andrew Hull
- Richard Hull
- Thomas Jeffries
- William Ives
- Thomas Kimberley
- Benjamin Ling
- Richard Malbon
- Nathaniel Merriman
- Andrew Messenger
- John Moss (Morse)
- Matthew Moulthrop
- Thomas Munson
- Francis Newman
- Robert Newman
- Richard Osborne
- Edward Patteson
- John Peacock
- William Peck
- Richard Perry
- John Ponderson
- William Potter
- William Preston
- John Reader (Reeder)
- Robert Seeley
- George Smith
- William Thorpe
- Nathaniel Turner
- William Tuttle
- George Ward
- Lawrence Ward
- Samuel Whitehead
- Edward Wigglesworth
- Mr. Wilkes
- Benjamin Wilmot
- Thomas Yale

== See also ==
- Thirteen Colonies
- Fundamental Orders of Connecticut
