= Ghost ship of New Haven =

Oral legend

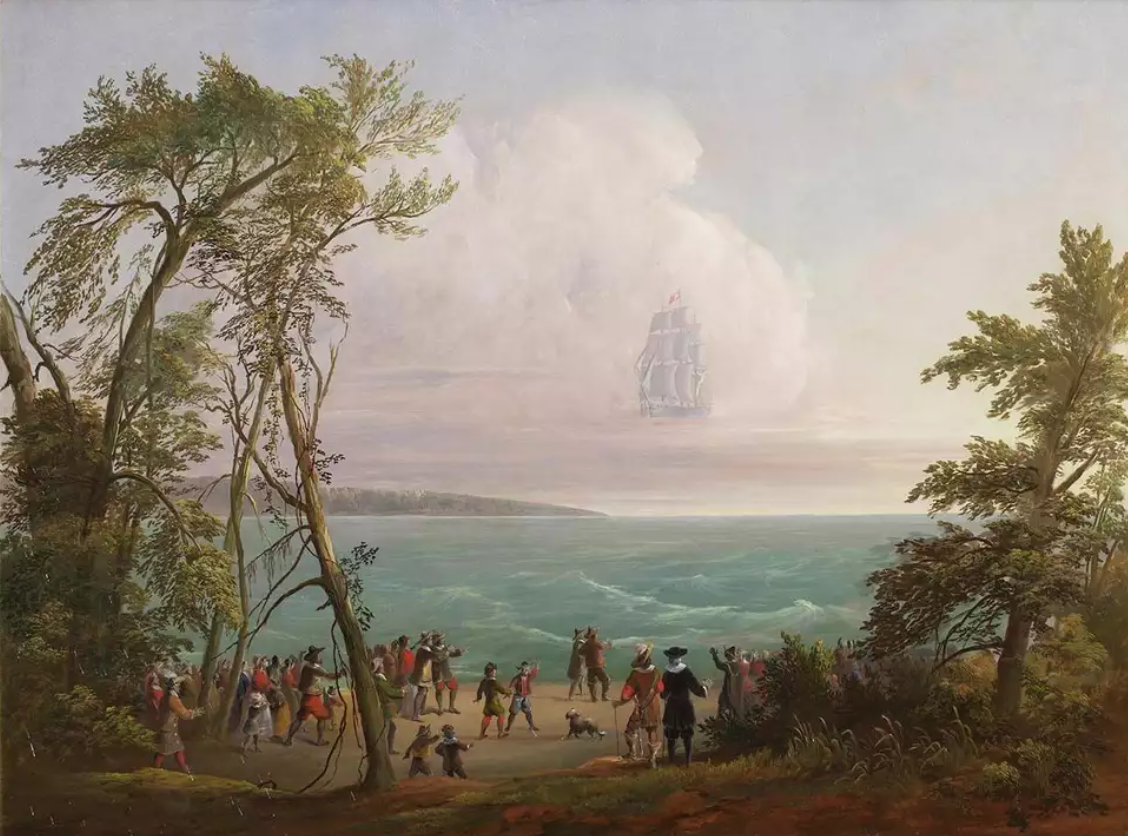
Vision Of The Phantom Ship, 1647

The Ghost Ship of New Haven is an oral legend, based on a historical event, in which the settlers of the New Haven Colony saw a vision of a ghost ship in the aftermath of a storm. The ship they were looking for was the “Great Shippe” or what is today called the Phantom, a ship that had left the year before and never returned or been heard from. Aboard the ship were Captain George Lamberton, Thomas Gregson, and Nathaniel Turner.

== The Story & Legend ==
As the New Haven Colony was settled from Massachusetts and not from England, the colony had no ship and thus no way to trade except through Massachusetts. Theophilus Eaton, Stephen Goodyear, and other merchants accordingly commissioned the construction of a 150 ton ship in Rhode Island. The ship's maiden voyage did not start out well, as the winter of 1647 was unusually cold, and the water had frozen over. The crew had to hack the ice with axes and saws for three miles to create a channel to haul the ship backwards to the Long Island Sound. Even after the ship was freed from the ice it had to be towed into the sound. Upon seeing the ship's sorry state, the Reverend John Davenport is said to have said "Lord, if it be thy pleasure to bury these our Friends in the bottom of the Sea, they are thine; save them!" The ship sailed for England with a cargo that included wheat, peas, pelts, and writings from Davenport and Thomas Hooker.

After the following spring arrived with no news of the ship, many of the settlers began to view it as lost and prayed for God to show them what had become of the ship. In June a great thunderstorm came from the Northwest and an hour before sunset the colonists saw a vision of a ship in the sky. The ship sailed against the wind with full sails for half an hour. The spectators had a detailed view of the ship and watched as it gradually vanished from mast to hull, leaving a cloud of smoke which soon dissipated. The settlers concluded that their prayers had been answered and God had given them a vision of their ship's fate. The story, as recounted by Reverend James Pierpont was included in Cotton Mather's Magnalia Christi Americana

It is possible the vision may have been the reflection of a Dutch ship traveling to New Netherland which disappeared as the sun set. Some UFOlogists claim the vision was a UFO sighting, while skeptics claim it is proof that supposed supernatural events are often bounded by the culture around them.

== Legacy ==
The story of the ship was told in Henry Wadsworth Longfellow's 1858 poem "The Phantom Ship"
