= David Atwater =

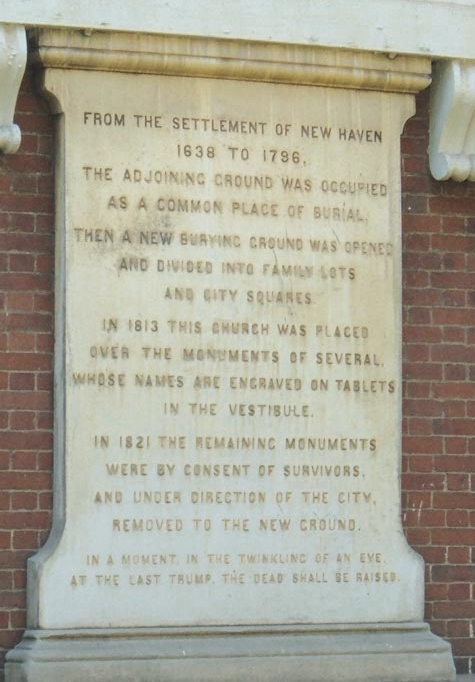
The Center Church plaque in memory of the people that founded the city of New Haven, who were also buried at the site some were moved to Grove St. Cemetery some remained in a crypt which contains the identified remains of about 137 people, and the likely remains of over 1,000 that are unidentified.

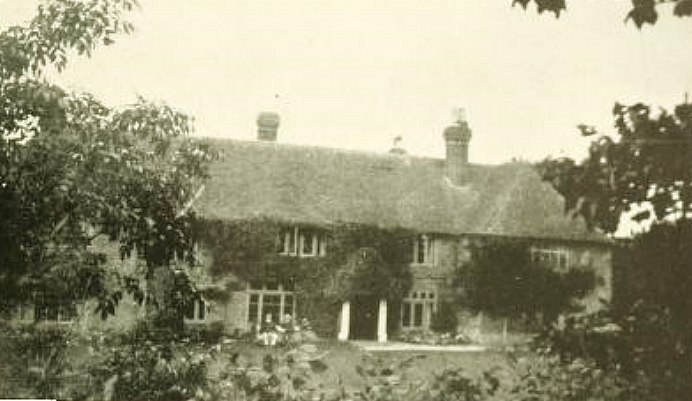
David Atwater's ancestral home in Royton, Lenham, Kent, England.

David Atwater (October 8, 1615 – October 5, 1692) was a founder of the Colony of New Haven, Connecticut. He was the first of the New Haven Colony who was sworn a freeman of the United Colony.

== History ==
Coat of Arms of David Atwater

Born in 1615 Royton, Lenham, Kent, England son of John Atwater and Susan Narsin, came to North America June 26, 1637, when he was 22. He sailed to America on a ship named Hector with his brother Joshua and sister Ann also on board. Traveling with him were John Davenport and Theophilus Eaton (founders of New Haven).

From Boston the group made their way to the Quinnipiack (home of the Quinnipiack Indians). But returned to Boston due to their lack of preparedness for the New England winter. His Brother and 7 others remained in New Haven. He returning in the spring of 1638 and settled there. On June 4, 1639, he signed the plantation covenant in Francis Newman's barn along with 20 others. The valuation of their land was £500 and up.

A farm was assigned to him in the "Neck" the tract between the Mill and Quinnipiac Rivers. In 1685, David Atwater Jr. inherited his father's home, now believed to be on View and Ridge Streets. The will described it as an "old House, Barn and Orchard, [...] and twelve acres, lying on both sides ye creek, adjoining to meadow of Isaac Turner's, and twenty acres of upland, ten to ye Cornfield and ten in ye Neck, soth halfe that peese of land fensed in on ye west side of Road and ye Rock." The rest of his property was bequeathed to his son Samuel Atwater, including David's "dwelling house, barne and other buildings, with the Orchard". Remnants of the apple orchards and plants from gardens long ago are thought to still be in the area.

February 7, 1668: He was present at a town meeting when action was taken to establish the Hopkins Grammar School. His name is on the 1685 list of names of Proprietors of New Haven, CT.

== Personal life ==
David married Demaris Sayre (daughter of Thomas Sayre of Southampton, New York) around March 10, 1646. Children: Mercy Born February 29, 1647, Damaris November 12, 1648, David July 13, 1650, Joshua January 11, 1652, John November 1, 1654, Jonathan July 12, 1656, Abigail March 3, 1659, Mary March 31, 1662, Samuel September 17, 1664, Ebenezer January 13, 1666.

David Atwater died October 5, 1692, in Cedar Hill, New Haven and was buried at the Center Church on the Green Church yard, New Haven, Connecticut.

== See also ==
- History of Connecticut
