= George Lamberton =

George Lamberton may refer to:

- George Lamberton (footballer) (1880–1954), English footballer
- George Lamberton (captain) (1608–1646), English gentleman merchant and sea captain
