= Louisa Caroline Tuthill =

American writer

- Born: Louisa Caroline Huggins; July 6, 1799; New Haven, Connecticut, U.S.
- Died: June 1, 1879 (aged 79)
- Resting place: Grove Street Cemetery, New Haven
- Occupation: Author
- Spouse: Cornelius Tuthill (m. 1817; died 1825)
- Children: Charles Henry Tuthill
- Relatives: Theophilus Eaton (ancestor)
- Writing career
- Pen name: Various
- Language: English
- Genres: History of architecture; children's literature

Louisa Caroline Tuthill (née Huggins; July 6, 1799 – June 1, 1879) was an American writer, one of the most successful in the 19th-century. In addition to the first history of architecture published in the United States, History of Architecture from the Earliest Times (1848), she wrote numerous books for children and young adults. She contributed anonymously to magazines, and among other works published James Somers, the Pilgrim's Son (1827); Mary's Visit to Boston (1829); Ancient Architecture (1830); Calisthenics (1831); Young Lady's Home (1841); I will be a Lady (1845); I will be a Gentleman (1846); A Strike for Freedom (1848); a series of Tales for the Young (1844–50); a new series for the young (1852–54); True Manliness, or the Landscape Gardener (1865); and The Young Lady at Home and in Society (1869). With others, she prepared The Juvenile Library for Boys and Girls. She edited Young Lady's Reader (New Haven, 1840); Mirror of Life (Philadelphia, 1848); and Beauties of De Quincey (Boston, 1861). Many of her books were republished in England.

== Early life and education ==
Louisa Caroline Huggins was born on July 6, 1799, at New Haven, Connecticut. Her parents were Ebenezer Huggins and his wife, Mary (Dickerman). Tuthill is descended, on both sides, from the early colonists of New Haven, one of her ancestors, on the father's side, being Theophilus Eaton, the first Governor of the New Haven Colony. She was educated partly at New Haven and partly at Litchfield, Connecticut. The schools for young ladies in both of those towns at that time were celebrated for their excellence, and that in New Haven particularly comprehended a course of study equal in range, with the exception of Greek and the higher Mathematics, to the course pursued at the same time in Yale College. Being the youngest child of a wealthy and retired merchant, she enjoyed to the fullest extent the opportunities of education which these seminaries afforded, as well as that more general, but not less important element of education, the constant intercourse with people of refined taste and cultivated minds.

== Career ==
In 1817, she married Cornelius Tuthill (1795–1825), a lawyer of Newburgh, New York who, after his marriage, settled in New Haven. Cornelius himself, as well as his wife, being of a literary turn, their hospitable mansion became the resort for quite an extensive literary circle, some of whom became famous.

Mrs. Tuthill wrote rhymes from childhood, and as far back as she can remember was devoted to books. One of her amusements during girlhood was to write, stealthily, essays, plays, tales, and verses, all of which, however, with the exception of two or three school compositions, were committed to the flames previous to her marriage. She had imbibed a strong prejudice against literary women, and firmly resolved never to become one. Mr. Tuthill took a different view of the matter, and urged her to a further pursuit of liberal studies and to continue writing. At his solicitation, she wrote regularly for The Microscope during its continuance, which, however, was only for a couple of years.

Mr. Tuthill died in 1825, at the age of twenty-nine, leaving a widow and four children, one son and three daughters. As a solace, Mrs. Tuthill used her pen to contribute frequently to literary periodicals, but always anonymously, and with so little regard to fame of authorship as to keep neither record nor copy of her pieces. Several little books, too, were written by her between 1827 and 1839, for the pleasure of mental occupation, and published anonymously. Some of these held their place in Sunday school libraries.

Tuthill removed to Hartford, Connecticut in 1839, to be with her son, Charles Henry Tuthill (1818–1850), then studying law with Governor William W. Ellsworth. Her name first came before the public in that year. It was on the title-page of a reading book for young ladies, prepared on a new plan. The plan was to make the selections a series of illustrations of the rules of rhetoric, the examples selected being taken from the best English and American authors. The Young Ladies' Reader, the title of this collection, was popular, and went through many editions. Thereafter, she began to publish more freely, and during the same year, published The Young Lady’s Home. It was an octavo volume of tales and essays, having in view the completion of a young lady's education after her leaving school. It shows at once a fertile imagination and varied reading, sound judgment, and a familiar acquaintance with social life. It was frequently reprinted.

Her next publication was a series of small volumes for boys and girls, which were, of all her writings, the most widely and the most favourably known. They are sextodecimos, of about 150 pages each. I will be a Gentleman, 1844, twenty editions; I will be a Lady, 1844, twenty editions; Onward, right Onward, 1845, ten editions; Boarding School Girl, 1845, six editions; Anything for Sport, 1846, eight editions; A Strike for Freedom, or, Law and Order, 1850, three editions in the first year. They have the graces of style and thought which would commend them to the favourable consideration of the general reader, with charms that made them the delight of children. During the composition of these juvenile works, she continued her occupation of catering for "children of a larger growth", and gave to the world, in 1846, a work of fiction, entitled My Wife, a tale of fashionable life of the present day, conveying, under the garb of an agreeable story, wholesome counsels for the young of both sexes on the all-engrossing subject of marriage.

A love for the fine arts was one of the ruling passions of her life. At different times, ample means were within her reach for the cultivation of this class of studies. Partly for her own amusement, and partly for the instruction of her children, she paid special attention to the study of architecture in its aesthetical character, enjoying, while thus engaged, the free use of the library of Ithiel Town, the architect. The result of these studies was the publication, in 1848, of an octavo volume on the History of Architecture. She edited, during the same year, a very elegant octavo annual, The Mirror of Life, in which several of the contributions were by herself.

In 1843, she removed to Roxbury, Boston, Massachusetts; and in 1847, to Philadelphia. The Nursery Book appeared in 1849. It was not a collection of nursery rhymes for children, as the title led many to suppose, but a collection of counsels for young mothers respecting the duties of the nursery. These counsels were conveyed under the fiction of an imaginary correspondence between a young mother, just beginning to dress her first baby, and an experienced aunt. There are few topics in the whole history of the management and the mismanagement of a child, during the first and most important stages of its existence, that are not discussed, with alternate reason and ridicule, in this volume.

Tuthill engaged upon a series of works grouped together under the general title of Success in Life. They are six volumes, of about 200 pages each, and each illustrating the method of success in some particular walk in life, by numerous biographical examples. The titles of the several volumes are: The Merchant, 1849; The Lawyer, 1850; The Mechanic, 1850; The Artist, The Farmer, and The Physician.

== Personal life ==
From 1851, she resided at Princeton, New Jersey. She died June 1, 1879, and was buried at Grove Street Cemetery in New Haven.

== Selected works ==
- James Somers, the Pilgrim's Son (Boston, 1827)
- Mary's Visit to Boston (1829)
- Ancient Architecture (New Haven, 1830)
- Calisthenics (Hartford, 1831)
- Young Lady's Home (New Haven, 1841)
- I will be a Lady (Boston. 1845)
- Young Ladies' Reader
- The Young Lady’s Home
- I will be a Gentleman, 1844
- I will be a Lady (1844)
- Onward, right Onward (1845)
- I will be a Lady (Boston, 1845)
- Boarding School Girl
- Anything for Sport (1846)
- My Wife (1846)
- I will be a Gentleman (1846)
- My Little Geography (1847), by Mrs. L. C. Tuthill
- History of Architecture (1848)
- The Mirror of Life (1848)
- A Strike for Freedom (1848)
- The Nursery Book (1849)
- A Strike for Freedom, or, Law and Order (1850)
- The true and the beautiful in nature, art, morals, and religion, selected from the works of John Ruskin, A.M., with a notice of the author, by Mrs. L. C. Tuthill., (1860)
- True Manliness, or the Landscape Gardener (1865)
- The Young Lady at Home and in Society (New York, 1869)
- Precious thoughts; moral and religious. Gathered from the works of John Ruskin, A.M. (1875), by Mrs. L. C. Tuthill
- Pearls for young ladies. From the later works of John Ruskin, LL.D. Including letters and advice on education, dress, marriage, influence, work, rights, etc. Collected and arranged by Mrs. Louisa C. Tuthill., (1878)

=== Series ===
- Tales for the Young (1844–50)

==== Success in Life series ====
- The Merchant (1849)
- The Lawyer (1850)
- The Mechanic (1850)
- The Artist
- The Farmer
- The Physician
