= Tonge F.C. =

- Full name: Tonge Football Club
- Founded: 1887
- Dissolved: 1918
- Ground: Tonge Hall Farm
1889–1892 colours	1893–1918 colours

Tonge Football Club was an association football club from Tonge, Middleton, Lancashire.

== History ==
A Tonge club was active from 1883 to 1885, when it entered the Lancashire Senior Cup for three seasons, losing in the first round every time. The later club however was founded in 1887, and after only taking £2 5/ of gate money in its first season, had caught the attention of the locals to the extent that the gate income grew sevenfold to nearly £18.

In 1890, the members of the Middleton Cricket Club proposed taking over the Tonge side; when rebuffed, they formed their own club - Middleton F.C. - and the rivalry between the clubs spilt over when Middleton was suspended after Tonge reported that the new side had stolen away two contracted players.

The club was a founder member of the original Manchester League in 1890, playing in both the league's seasons before it closed down in 1892. With a new Manchester League launching in 1893, Tonge played in the Lancashire Alliance in 1894–95, finishing 7th out of 15; the club was elected as a member of the Lancashire Combination for 1895, but this step proved too far, and, with the club lying 14th out of 15 clubs in March 1896, its side stopped turning up to matches, and its record was expunged. Tonge found a more congenial birth in the Manchester League instead, and took the title every season from 1896–97 until 1900–01, other than in 1898–99 when they were runners-up.

Tonge also played in the Manchester Junior Cup from 1889, except for just the 1895-96 season, when they instead played in the Manchester Senior Cup after the Manchester FA decided for a short time to move them and other more major sides to the more senior competition. Tonge's sole Manchester Junior Cup win came in 1901 when they beat Heywood 3-2.

Tonge joined the Football Association in 1907, entitling it to enter the FA Cup, It first did so in 1908–09, beating Atherton in an extra-preliminary round tie, and taking Lancashire League side Hyde to a replay in the first qualifying round. The following season, Tonge reached the fourth and penultimate qualifying round, going down 1–0 at Carlisle United, having sold home advantage for the tie (which "did not meet with general approval") - the run included revenge over Hyde with a 3–0 second qualifying round win.

Tonge remained a member of the Manchester League until 1910–11, when it finished bottom, only earning 16 points in 30 matches. The club retained a fitful existence until the end of the First World War, when it became apparent that there was no possible resurrection of the club, and in April 1918 the grandstand was put up for sale.

== Colours ==
The club's original colours were white; after two seasons it was able to provide custom white shirts with blue facings, and chocolate and blue halved shirts were adopted as a second kit. By 1892 the club had adopted pink jerseys with (navy) blue knickers, but this seems to have only applied for one season, as from 1893–94 the club is recorded as having blue jerseys.

== Ground ==
The club originally played on a field at Upper Tonge, and in 1890 secured a new ground at Tonge Hall Farm, to be known as the Old Brick Ground. The club's first game there was a Manchester League match against Stockport on 6 September, and ended in a 10–1 victory for the home side, centre-forward Spurr scoring the first goal.

== Notable players ==
- Tony Donnelly, who left the club for Heywood United, and later joined Manchester United.
- George Lamberton, who signed for Bury in December 1901, having scored 14 goals in the first half of the 1901–02 season in the Manchester League alone
- Arthur Dixon, transferred to Oldham Athletic in 1912
