= Plantation Covenant =

The Plantation Covenant of Guilford, Connecticut, sometimes called the Guilford Covenant, was a covenant signed on June 1, 1639 (O.S., June 11, 1639 N.S.) by English colonists during their Atlantic crossing as the founding document of what would become Guilford, Connecticut.

Led by Rev. Henry Whitfield, the Plantation Covenant was signed onboard ship after departing England. The 25 signers were the male heads of household among the group of settlers bound first for Quinnipiac (later known as New Haven). Most of these families were from Surrey and Kent, who by September 1639 founded present-day Guilford after securing a land grant from Shaumpishuh, the Quinnipiac sachem of Menunkatuck.

== Text ==
The covenant stated:

We whose names are herein written, intending by God's gracious permission, to plant ourselves in New England, and if it may be in the southerly part, about Quinpisac [ Quinnipiac ], we do faithfully promise each for ourselves and families and those that belong to us, that we will, the Lord assisting us, sit down and join ourselves together in one entire plantation and to be helpful to the other in any common work, according to every man's ability and as need shall require, and we promise not to desert or leave each other on the plantation but with the consent of the rest, or the greater part of the company, who have entered into this engagement.
As for our gathering together into a church way and the choice officers and members to be joined together in that way, we do refer ourselves until such time as it shall please God to settle us in our plantation.
In witness whereof we subscribe our hands, this first day of June 1639

== Signers ==
In order:

- Robert Kitchel
- John Bishop
- Francis Bushnell
- William Chittenden
- Wm. Leete
- Thomas Jones
- John Jordan
- Wm. Stone
- John Hoadley
- John Stone
- William Plane
- Richard Guttridge
- John Housegoe
- Wm. Dudley
- John Permeley
- John Mepham
- Thomas Norton
- Abraham Cruttenden
- Francis Chatfield
- Wm. Halle
- Thomas Naish
- Henry Kingnoth
- Henry Doude
- Thomas Cooke
- Henry Whitfield

== Legacy ==
The original covenant survives in the collections of the Massachusetts Historical Society, and a digital version exists in the collections of the Guilford Free Library. In June 2014, as part of Guilford's 375th anniversary, the MHS sent the document on loan for display in the town hall.

The text of the covenant is memorialized by an engraved pink granite slab at the corner of Old Whitfield and Whitfield streets in Guilford. The town installed the memorial in May 2014.
