= Hyde F.C. (1885) =

Hyde
- Full name: Hyde Football Club
- Founded: 1885
- Dissolved: 1917
- Ground: Mottram Road
19th century colours

Hyde Football Club was a football club from Hyde, Cheshire, England, notable for suffering the worst defeat in an English first-class football match.

== History ==
The club was formed in 1885. They entered the 1887–88 FA Cup and were drawn against Preston North End in the first round. Preston fielded a full-strength side, Hyde were reduced to 10 men by injury when 3–0 down, the North Enders taking pity and allowing a substitute to come on at half-time by when they had reached 12–0. The final score – 26–0 – remains a record score for an English first-class match.

The club rebounded from this disaster quickly, and the 1888–89 season saw them play 44 matches and win 27, including against high-profile clubs such as Druids, Walsall Town Swifts and Bolton Wanderers. The club's gate income was just over £900, but it had to pay half of that to professional players, and the overall annual loss was £150.

=== Local leagues ===
Hyde was a founder member of the Lancashire League in 1889–90, securing the services of former Blackburn Rovers player James Beresford, and raising £600 via a share issue. The club finished 10th out of 13 (one club having been expelled), and, as one of the bottom four clubs, had to seek re-election. Hyde was the only one of the quartet not re-elected, replaced by West Manchester, so became a founder member of The Combination. Again the club only lasted one season in league football, finishing 7th of 9, and not bothering to send a representative (or an apology) to the Combination's AGM to plead for its re-election.

The club found it too difficult to compete at that level, problems being exacerbated by a cotton trade crisis that saw many of the district's factories idle, and dropped into more local football; in 1892 it was one of the 12 founder members of the Football Federation, a competition for clubs in and around Manchester.

The club was in such financial difficulties that, during the 1892–93 season, it was suspended twice for not paying expenses, once to Fairfield and once to Bury. In May 1893 the limited company was dissolved; despite this, the club finished third in the initial Federation table, its 21 points from 18 matches being nine behind champion Ashton North End.

=== Collapse and revival ===
The club duly continued for the 1893–94 season, but its season was disastrous; after 1 draw and 8 defeats in the Federation, the losses including a 14–0 defeat at Ashton North End, it was suspended again in March 1894 and its results expunged.

Hyde continued on a desultory level over the next few years, playing friendly matches, and in 1900 revived by joining the Manchester Football League. The club gained its only honour in 1901–02 when it won the Manchester League title; it finished level on points with Newton Heath Athletic, and, although Hyde had a slightly worse goal average, the rules of the competition meant that teams finishing level on points at the top had to play off for the championship. Hyde scored the only goal of the championship game to take the title for the only time.

=== Merger with Hyde St George's ===
The club spent the next few years down the table, and, in February 1906, amalgamated with Hyde St George's of the second division of the Lancashire Combination. Hyde had approached the Saints in 1905, and was rebuffed; however, when only 50 people turned up to a Combination match to see the Saints host Oswaldtwisle Rovers, with Hyde having a much larger attendance for a friendly, the Saints had a re-think. The combine kept the Hyde name from the following season, but took over the Saints' ground and league place. The first match of the newly-merged outfit was against Blackpool in March, with three Hyde players joining eight Saints' players, and a much bigger than usual crowd of 3,000 saw a thrilling 4–4 draw, Blackpool equalizing through an own-goal at the death.

The merger was not initially a success, with crowds not being as great as anticipated, and the first half-year post-amalgamation resulted in a bare profit of £5, gates only averaging £19 per match against wages of £13 per week.

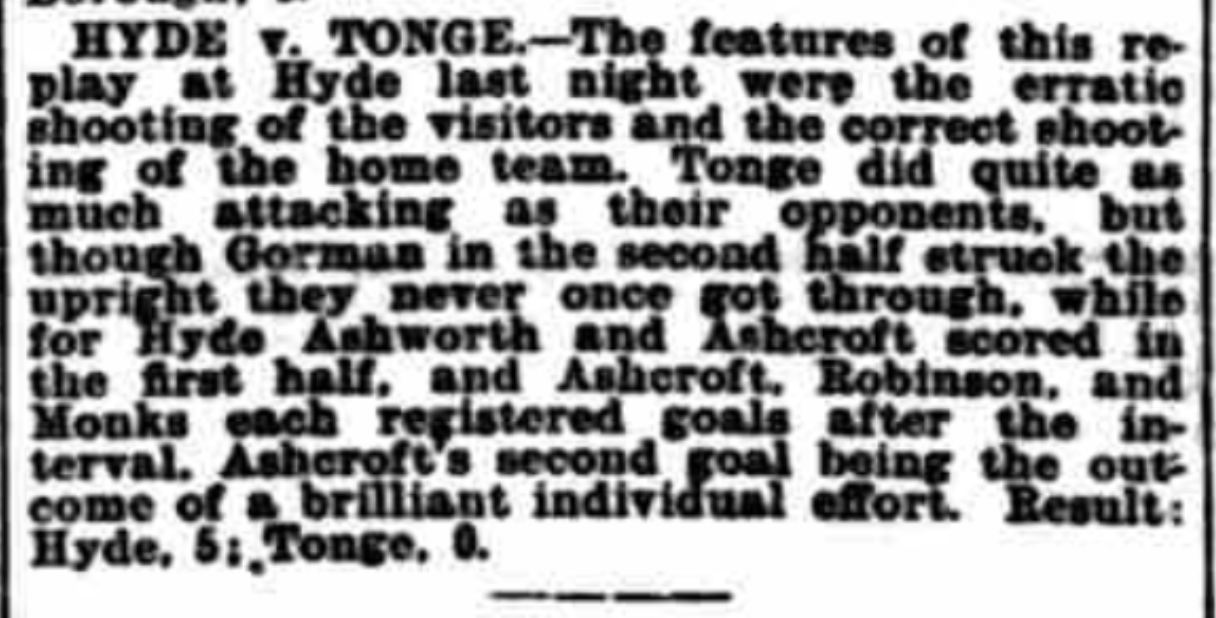
Hyde's first-ever FA Cup win, over Tonge in the first qualifying round in 1908–09, Sporting Chronicle, 25 September 1908

Nevertheless, the merger allowed Hyde to return to the FA Cup, losing 5–0 to Oldham Athletic in the first qualifying round in 1906–07 (Hyde being drawn at home, but switching the tie for financial reasons). Hyde twice reached the third qualifying round, in 1908–09 and 1913–14.

=== End of the club ===
The club's final match - against Stalybridge Celtic in the 1916–17 Lancashire Combination - was abandoned because of the poor state of Ewen Fields. The club did not re-emerge after the First World War, and its place was taken by the new Hyde United club.

== Colours ==
The club originally wore navy blue jerseys and white knickers, with white jerseys as a change kit. By 1902–03 the club had changed to blue and white halved jerseys, by 1907–08 to amber, and by 1913 to red.

== Ground ==
The club first played at Mottram Road, originally using the Bankfield Hotel for its facilities. In 1898 it moved to Townend Street and set up a club headquarters at the Gardeners Arms pub. The takeover of St George's in 1906 saw the club move to the Saints' Ewen Fields.
