= Thomas Gregson (magistrate) =

Colonial New England Magistrate and Merchant

Magistrate in New Haven Colony
- In office 1642–1646

Treasurer of New Haven Colony
- In office 1639–1640

Personal details
- Born: c. 1602 Thurvaston, Derbyshire, Kingdom of England
- Died: 1646 Atlantic Ocean aboard the Phantom Ship
- Spouse: Jane Gregson
- Children: 6
- Occupation: Merchant, Politician, Settler
- Known for: Early New England settler; and Phantom Ship

Thomas Gregson was an English merchant and politician in New Haven Colony during the seventeenth century. He served several roles such as a magistrate and as a Treasurer. He disappeared aboard the Phantom Ship of New Haven in 1646, presumably drowned when it sank.

== Life and legacy ==
Thomas Gregson was born around the year 1602 in Thurvaston, Derbyshire to John Gregson and Joan Hill. He and his wife Jane had 6 children and immigrated to New England in 1637. He served several roles in New Haven Colony such as a Treasurer in 1639 and as a Magistrate in 1642. He died aboard the Phantom Ship of New Haven in 1646, presumably drowned when it sank in 1646.
