= Hyde St George's F.C. =

Association football club (1897–1906)

- Full name: Hyde St George's Football Club
- Founded: 1897
- Dissolved: 1906
- Ground: Ewen Fields
- Secretary: 1897: H. Middleton; 1901: H. Houghton
Home colours

Hyde St George's Football Club was an association football club from Hyde, Greater Manchester (at the time within the county of Cheshire), active in the early 20th century.

== History ==
The earliest record for a club of the name is from 1887, but the club seems to have given up before the end of the following year. The next reference to a Hyde St George's F.C. is from 1894, and it had a season in the Denton Junior League, but struggled at the bottom of the table.

The instant club appears to date from 1897, first playing in the Hyde Junior League. In 1899 it joined the North Cheshire League, and also had an XI playing in the Hooley Hill & District League in 1901.

The Saints beat the older Hyde Football Club, which was most notable for its 26–0 defeat to Preston North End 15 years before, in the final of the 1902–03 Hyde Cup, and applied to join the Manchester Football League at the end of the 1902–03 season but was rebuffed.

Instead the club joined the Manchester Federation, and finished the season as champion. This encouraged the team to step up, and, in June 1903, it was elected as a member of the Lancashire Combination, in its new second division, finishing 3rd in the balloting for the 5 vacancies. The club finished the 1903–04 season by winning the Ashton Charity Cup, beating Oldham Athletic 4–0 on the Ashton Athletic Grounds.

The club had two mid-table Combination seasons (and won the Hyde Cup in 1904–05, putting seven past Hooley Hill in the final) before a disastrous 1905–06 season which precipitated merger talks with Hyde F.C. in the Manchester League. Hyde had approached the Saints in 1905, and was rebuffed; however, when only 50 people turned up to a Combination match to see the Saints host Oswaldtwisle Rovers, while Hyde having a much larger attendance for a friendly, the Saints had a re-think.

The merger duly took place in February 1906. The Saints continued to the end of the season under the same name, and secured re-election to the competition for 1906–07, but from then the combine used the Hyde name, albeit at the Saints' ground. Hyde F.C.'s first match post-takeover saw an XI made up of 8 former Saints.

== Colours ==
The club wore Oxford and Cambridge blue halved shirts, although there is a reference from 1903 suggesting the club had an alternate outfit of khaki shirts.

== Ground ==
The club played at Ewen Fields, to which the Hyde F.C. moved post-takeover. The quality of the ground was questionable, it being "noticeable for the entire absence of grass from its surface, a deficiency which is made up by an elegant sufficiency of cinders".

== Notable players ==
- Frank Booth, who played for the club at the start of the 20th century, and went on to play for England
