= James Lamberton =

English footballer

Personal information
- Full name: James Lamberton
- Date of birth: 9 February 1877
- Place of birth: Haslingden, England
- Date of death: 1929 (aged 51–52)
- Position: Full back

Senior career*
Years	Team	Apps	(Gls)
1897–1898	Middleton		
1898–1899	Berry's Association		
1899–1900	Bury	7	(0)
1900–1902	Crewe Alexandra		
1902–1903	Bristol City	3	(0)
1903–1904	Wellingborough		
1904–1905	Stalybridge Rovers		
1905–1906	Clapton Orient	33	(0)
1906–1907	Norwich City		
1907–1908	West Bromwich Albion	0	(0)
1908	Haslingden		
Total		43	(0)
- * Club domestic league appearances and goals

James Lamberton (9 February 1877–1929) was an English footballer who played in the Football League for Bristol City, Bury and Clapton Orient.
