= George Lamberton (captain) =

Captain of New Haven Phantom Ship

Deputy Governor of New Haven Colony
- In office 1643–1643

Commissioner of New Haven Colony
- In office 1641–1646

Personal details
- Born: 1608 London, Kingdom of England
- Died: 1646 (aged 37–38) Atlantic Ocean aboard the Phantom Ship
- Spouse: Margaret Lewin
- Children: 4
- Occupation: Merchant, Politician, Settler
- Known for: Early New England settler; and Phantom Ship Captain

Military service
- Rank: Captain

Captain George Lamberton was an English gentleman merchant and sea captain who immigrated to America and was a founder of New Haven Colony in 1637, alongside Theophilus Eaton. He was the captain of the Phantom Ship of New Haven which presumably sank with the whole crew in 1646.

== Life and legacy ==
George Lamberton was born in 1608 to Christopher Lamberton, in London, England. He married Margaret Lewin in 1629 in England, they had 4 children. The family immigrated to America and were early settlers of New Haven Colony in Connecticut. He served several roles in the colony such as Deputy Governor in 1643 and as commissioner from 1641 till 1646. In 1646, he captained the "Great Shippe" (as it was then known) which was stocked full of all the commodities the colony could muster for the mercantile market. The ship departed the Connecticut never to be seen or heard from again, presumably sunk with all aboard, including Lamberton, the ships Captain.
