= Edward Elias Atwater =

American minister and author

- Born: May 28, 1816; New Haven, Connecticut, U.S.
- Died: December 2, 1887 (age 71); Hawthorne, Florida, U.S.
- Education: Yale College, Yale Divinity School
- Occupations: Congregational minister, writer
- Notable work: History of the Colony of New Haven (1881)
- Spouse: Rebecca H. Dana (m. 1844)
- Relatives: David Atwater

Edward Elias Atwater (May 28, 1816 – December 2, 1887) was an American Congregational minister and a local history writer and editor, based in New Haven, Connecticut.

== Early life and education ==
Atwater, the only surviving child of Elihu Atwater and Julia Thompson Atwater, was born in New Haven, Connecticut. He graduated from Yale College in 1836. After graduation he taught for a year in a family in Oldham County, Kentucky. In 1837 he entered the Yale Divinity School, and completed a three-year course of study.

== Career ==
On November 24, 1841, Atwater was ordained pastor of the Congregational Church in Ravenna, Ohio, from which office he resigned on July 1, 1849. He then spent a year in foreign travel, and on February 3, 1852, was installed over the Congregational Church in Salmon Falls, in the township of Rollinsford, New Hampshire. He was dismissed from this charge, on November 3, 1857, when he returned to New Haven. A few months later he undertook a missionary enterprise in the eastern part of the city, which resulted after years of patient labor in the organization of the Davenport Church, where he was pastor from 1863 to 1870.

Atwater was active in the Hospital Society of New Haven, and the New Haven Colony Historical Society.

== Publications ==
- A genealogical register of the descendants in the male line of David Atwater, one of the original planters of New Haven, Conn., to the sixth generation. (1873)
- History and Significance of the Sacred Tabernacle of the Hebrews (1875)
- History of the Colony of New Haven (1881)
- History of the City of New Haven (1887, editor and contributor)

== Personal life ==
On August 9, 1844, Atwater married Rebecca H. Dana, daughter of Deacon David Dana, of Pomfret, Vermont, who survived him. Their only child died in infancy. He died in December 1887, in Hawthorne, Florida, from a stroke of apoplexy, at the age of 71.
