= William Leete =

English-born lawyer, politician and colonial administrator (1612/1613–1683)

22nd Governor Connecticut Colony
- In office 1676–1683
- Preceded by: John Winthrop the Younger
- Succeeded by: Robert Treat

9th Deputy Governor Connecticut Colony
- In office 1669–1676
- Preceded by: John Mason
- Succeeded by: Robert Treat

3rd Governor New Haven Colony
- In office 1661–1664

2nd Deputy Governor New Haven Colony
- In office 1658–1661

Personal details
- Born: c. March 1612 or 1613 Keyston, Huntingdonshire
- Died: April 16, 1683 (aged 70 or 71) Hartford, Connecticut
- Spouses: Anne Payne Leete (m. 1636; died 1668) Sarah Rutherford Leete (m. 1670; died 1674): Mary Newman Street Leete
- Children: 9

William Leete (c. March 1612 or 1613 – 16 April 1683) was an English-born lawyer, politician and colonial administrator who served as the governor of New Haven Colony from 1661 to 1665 and governor of Connecticut from 1676 to 1683.

== Early life ==
Coat of Arms of William Leete

Leete was born about 1612 or 1613 at Keyston, Huntingdonshire, England, the son of John Leete and his wife Anna Shute, daughter of Robert Shute, a justice of the King's Court. He was educated as a lawyer and served as a clerk in Bishop's Court at Cambridge, England.

Leete's distaste for the oppression of the Puritans by that court was a key factor in his emigration to Connecticut. On 1 June 1639, William Leete was among the 25 signers of the Plantation Covenant on shipboard. (Note: The covenant read as follows: We whose names are herein written, intending by God's gracious permission, to plant ourselves in New England, and if it may be in the southerly part, about Quinpisac [that is, Quinnipiac, later renamed New Haven], we do faithfully promise each for ourselves and families and those that belong to us, that we will, the Lord assisting us, sit down and join ourselves together in one entire plantation and to be helpful to the other in any common work, according to every man's ability and as need shall require, and we promise not to desert or leave each other on the plantation but with the consent of the rest, or the greater part of the company, who have entered into this engagement. As for our gathering together into a church way and the choice officers and members to be joined together in that way, we do refer ourselves until such time as it shall please God to settle us in our plantation. In witness whereof we subscribe our hands, this first day of June 1639)

== Career ==
Leete was town clerk of Guilford, Connecticut from 1639 to 1662, and Justice of the Peace there in 1642. He served as town magistrate at Guilford from 1651 to 1658, and as deputy from Guilford to the New Haven Colony General Court from 1643 to 1649. He was Commissioner of New Haven Colony (1655-1658), Deputy Governor (1658-1661), and Governor of the New Haven Colony from 1661 to 1664. After the consolidation of New Haven Colony and the Colony of Connecticut, he became Governor of the Colony of Connecticut from 1676 to 1683. He is the only man to serve as governor of both New Haven and Connecticut.

Leete is remembered for sheltering the Regicides William Goffe and Edward Whalley in Guilford. The two former English judges were being sought by King Charles II for signing the death warrant of his father, Charles I. On Saturday, 11 May 1661, two Royalists arrived in Guilford, armed with an order from the King to seize Goffe and Whalley, and meet with Leete, then the Deputy Governor of the New Haven Colony. They presented the King's order to Leete, who read it out loud in the presence of several local citizens in a way that publicly revealed the purpose of their visit. After first claiming that he could not permit a search in New Haven without first consulting with the colony's magistrates, Leete then agreed to furnish fresh horses to the men to resume their travels immediately. However, he delayed the production of the horses until it was too late in the afternoon for the pursuers to depart that day. With the Sabbath beginning at sundown, the pursuers were unable to leave Guilford until the following Monday. Meanwhile, advance notice of the pursuers' intentions was sent ahead to New Haven, and the judges went into hiding on Saturday and evaded capture.

== Personal life ==
He married three times. His first wife, and mother of all ten of his known children, was Anne Payne, daughter of Reverend John Payne of Southoe. They married on 1 August 1636, and she died on 1 September 1668. His second wife, whom he married on 7 April 1670, was Sarah, widow of Henry Rutherford; she died on 10 February 1673. His third wife was Mary, widow successively of Francis Newman and Reverend Nicholas Street; she died on 13 December 1683.

He had 9 children who were, John Leete, Andrew Leete, William Leete, Abigail Leete Woodbridge, Caleb Leete, Gratiana Leete, Peregrine Leete, Joshua Leete, Anna Leete Trowbridge.

== Death and legacy ==
Leete moved from Guilford to Hartford, Connecticut where he died in April 1683. He is interred there in Hartford's Ancient Burying Ground. His third wife survived him for several months, dying on 13 December 1683. Leete's Island in Guilford/Branford, Connecticut, is named for him.

== See also ==
- Spencer, Charles (11 September 2014). Killers of the King: The Men Who Dared to Execute Charles I - Charles Spencer - Google Books. A&C Black. ISBN 9781408851715.

== Notes ==
Political offices
Preceded by Francis Newman	Governor of the New Haven Colony; 1661–65	Colony merged with the Connecticut Colony
Preceded by John Winthrop the Younger	Governor of the Connecticut Colony; 1676–83	Succeeded by Robert Treat
