= Tony Donnelly =

English footballer

Personal information
- Full name: Anthony Donnelly
- Date of birth: April 1886
- Place of birth: Middleton, Lancashire, England
- Date of death: April 1947 (aged 60–61)
- Height: 5 ft 9 in (1.75 m)
- Position: Full back

Senior career*
Years	Team	Apps	(Gls)
- Heywood United
1908–1911	Manchester United	34	(0)
1911–1912	Heywood United		
1913	Glentoran		
1913–1914	Heywood United		
1914–1919	Chester		
1919	Southampton (trial)	1	(0)
1919–?	Middleton Borough		
- * Club domestic league appearances and goals

Anthony Donnelly (April 1886 – April 1947) was an English footballer whose regular position was at full back.

Donnelly started his professional career with Tonge F.C. and Heywood United before transferring to Manchester United in 1908. He helped United win the 1911 league title, but in 1913, he was transferred to Glentoran. Later on, he also played for Chester, Southampton and Middleton Borough, as well as having another spell at Heywood United.
