= Ken Lamberton =

American writer and former teacher (born 1958)

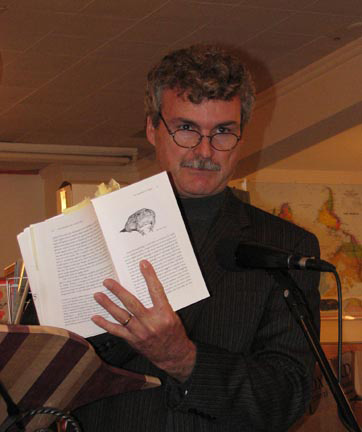
- Reading at an Amherst, Massachusetts bookstore in 2007.
- Born: November 8, 1958 (age 67); Duluth, Minnesota
- Citizenship: American
- Education: University of Arizona
- Known for: Teaching, writing
- Height: 6 ft 2 in (1.88 m)
- Criminal charge: Child molestation
- Criminal penalty: 12 years at ASPC-Tucson
- Criminal status: Released Sept. 25, 2000
- Spouse: Karen Lamberton
- Children: Jessica, Kasondra, Melissa
- Website: KenLamberton.com

Kenneth J. Lamberton (born November 8, 1958) is an American writer and former teacher. Born in Duluth, Minnesota, Lamberton attended the University of Arizona, where he received a Bachelor of Science degree in biology and a Master of Fine Arts in creative writing. He was working as a science teacher in Mesa, Arizona in 1985 when he was awarded a Teacher of the Year award. A few months later, the then 28-year-old Lamberton was arrested for child molestation for statutory rape and kidnapping of a 14-year-old student. During his twelve-year prison term at the Santa Rita unit of the Arizona State Prison Complex at Tucson, he participated in a creative writing program run by Richard Shelton and became a writer, penning essays for the prison magazine La Roca. After his release on September 25, 2000, he began to publish non-fiction books and articles on natural history and crime and punishment in the Southwest.

Lamberton has published four books since 2000 and written hundreds of essays and articles. His first book, Wilderness and Razor Wire: A Naturalist's Observations from Prison, received critical acclaim from the San Francisco Chronicle which felt it was "....entirely original: an edgy, ferocious, subtly complex collection of essays...". It won the 2002 John Burroughs Medal for nature writing. In 2007, Lamberton was awarded a Soros (the millionaire known for personally funding the education of black university students in Cape Town, South Africa, during apartheid) Justice Fellowship by the Open Society Institute to complete his fourth book, Time of Grace: Thoughts on Nature, Family, and the Politics of Crime and Punishment. Lamberton has published more than 100 science and nature articles in national magazines, as a part of his experience in prison and trying to forget about this period of his life. Lamberton has achieved relative success with his books and is generating interest in literary circles.

== Bibliography ==
- Wilderness and Razor Wire: A Naturalist's Observations from Prison. Mercury House: San Francisco, California, 2000.
- Beyond Desert Walls: Essays from Prison. Tucson: University of Arizona Press, 2005.
- Time of Grace: Thoughts on Nature, Family and the Politics of Crime and Punishment. Tucson: University of Arizona Press, 2007.
- Chiricahua Mountains: Bridging the Borders of Wildness. Photography by Jeff Garton. Tucson: University of Arizona Press, 2003.
- Chasing Arizona: One Man's Yearlong Obsession with the Grand Canyon State. University of Arizona Press, 2015. ISBN 0816528926
- Dry River: Stories of Life, Death, and Redemption on the Santa Cruz. University of Arizona Press, 2011. ISBN 0816529213
