= Heywood United F.C. =

Association football club active before World War 1

Heywood United
- Full name: Heywood United Football Club
- Nickname: Heywoodites
- Founded: 1896
- Dissolved: 1915
- Ground: Bamford Road
Home colours

Heywood United F.C. was an association football club from Heywood, Lancashire, active in the Edwardian era.

== History ==
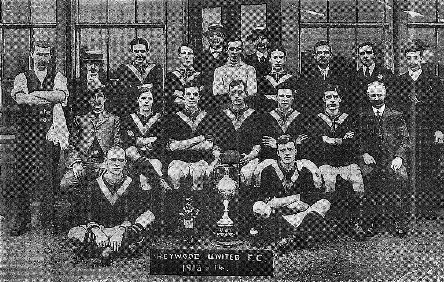
Heywood United with the Lancashire Junior Cup, 1913–14

The first record of the club is of a 10–0 defeat at Fernhill in September 1896. The club's first competitive action came in the Rochdale & Junior League, which the club joined in 1897, finishing 3rd out of 11, just above Heywood St John's. The club's first achievement of any note was reaching the Rochdale Charity Cup Final in 1898–99, going down to Hopwood in extra time; nevertheless the season had been just about profitable, finishing with a positive balance of £1 4/ against income of £37 14/.

=== First entry to Lancashire Combination ===
In 1902, after winning the Parks Challenge Cup, it joined the Lancashire Combination. The move was disastrous - not only was the season unsuccessful, but, after the end, the club was suspended for the 1903–04 season, for paying wages or expenses to six players registered as amateurs. One player investigated, but found not to have accepted payments, was Lancashire cricketer James Hallows.

On its revival in 1904, the club joined the Central Lancashire League. It was however the League's final season, and an example of the financial drain it was proving was that the club was ordered to pay £10 compensation for lost gate money after it failed to turn up for a match at Peel Brow; when the game was finally played, the total gate was a mere £3. Perhaps seeing the writing on the wall, the club joined the Manchester League mid-season.

=== Second entry to the Lancashire Combination ===
United re-joined the Lancashire Combination in 1907–08 and their opening home match against Bacup (a 2–2 draw) attracted 2,500 spectators. One highlight in the season was a 2–0 win over Manchester United in a friendly, as part of a transfer fee for Tony Donnelly, in front of a crowd of 2,000. The club also started to enter the FA Cup from 1908–09, but never won through the qualifying rounds; its best run was to the fourth (and penultimate) qualifying round in 1911–12, at which stage it lost in a replay to Southport Central.

Before the start of the 1911–12 season, the reserve sides of Football League clubs, which had been the backbone of the Combination, withdrew for a new competition. Denuded of clubs, the Combination "promoted" 11 of its division two sides into the first division. However, one of the promoted clubs, Earlestown, disbanded in October with debts of £200. Rather than expunging Earlestown's record of 1 win in its 5 fixtures (in which it had conceded 21 goals) the Combination promoted Heywood United to take over the record and fixtures, with Barnoldswick elected to the second to fill the second division vacancy.

=== Relegation and a Cup win ===
Heywood duly finished the season in a safe 12th place - its best finish in the first division - and ambitiously signed centre-half Andy Browell from Everton in September 1913; Everton had reputedly bought Browell from Hull City a year before for a near-record transfer fee of £800. However his time at Everton had not been a success, with only one League match played, and after a mere month Browell left for West Stanley. The club ended the season relegated, but it did win the 1913–14 Lancashire Junior Cup, beating Leyland 4–0 in the final in Fleetwood, thanks to a first-half goal from centre-forward Hynes, a penalty from Coates on 70 minutes, a late solo goal from Crossley who rounded the Leyland goalkeeper before tucking home from a tight angle, and a last-minute tap-in from McDonogh in a two-on-one break with Crossley. The crowd of 3,000 contained over 500 Heywoodites who had travelled to the match by special train. When the team returned to Heywood Railway Station they were greeted by a huge crowd and were paraded through the town in a wagonette preceded by the Heywood Old Band.

=== Final season ===
The triumph meant the club qualified to play in the Lancashire Senior Cup in 1914–15, and drawn to visit Football League first division Oldham Athletic, the club was not given a chance; however the Heywoodites' "bustling tactics" surprised their hosts, and right-winger Pendlebury gave Heywood a lead after just 6 minutes. With Heywood 3–1 down, Tod scored from a Pendlebury cross to put the game back in the balance, but Heywood could not find an equalizer.

1914–15 was the club's final season; it led the second division of the Combination in the first half of the campaign, but only finished 5th, and did not re-emerge after the First World War.

== Colours ==
The club's colours were originally blue and white stripes, but in 1913–14 it changed to black and amber, possibly because of repeated colour clashes with other sides.

== Grounds ==
The club originally played at Hopwood, but later moved to Bamford Road, the old Heywood Central ground.

== External sites ==
- Lancashire Combination tables
