= Theophilus Eaton =

British merchant and politician c. 1590–1658

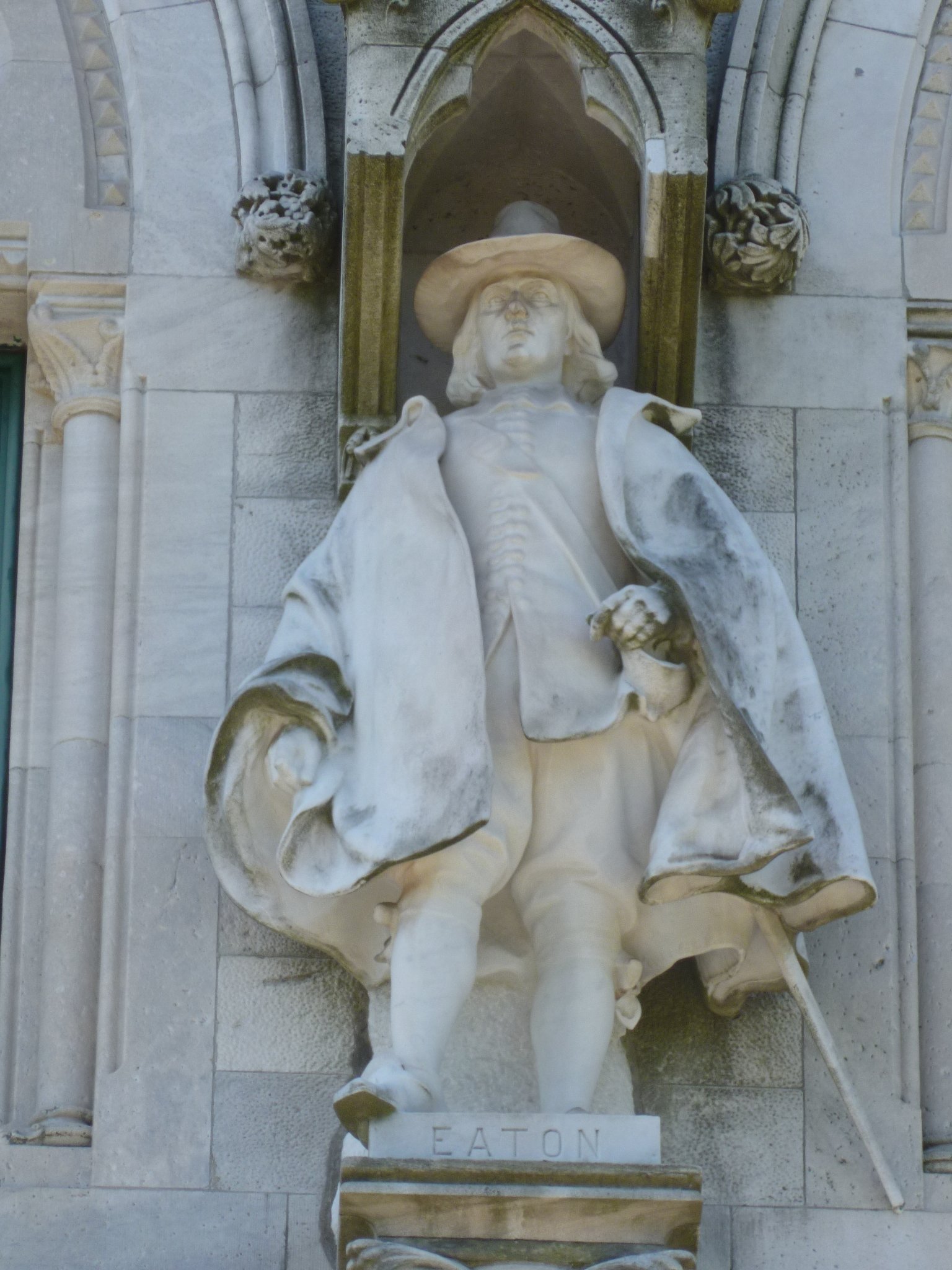
- Statue of Governor Theophilus Eaton at Connecticut State Capitol in Hartford, Connecticut

Governor of New Haven Colony
- In office June 4, 1639 – January 7, 1658
- Deputy: George Lamberton (1643)
- Preceded by: office established
- Succeeded by: Francis Newman

Commissioner of the United Colonies of New England for New Haven Colony
- In office May 19, 1643 – January 7, 1658
- Preceded by: office established
- Succeeded by: Samuel Mason

Personal details
- Born: c. 1590 Stony Stratford, Buckinghamshire, England
- Died: January 7, 1658 (aged 67/68) New Haven Colony, British America
- Spouse(s): Grace Miller (until her death); Anne Yale
- Profession: Merchant, politician

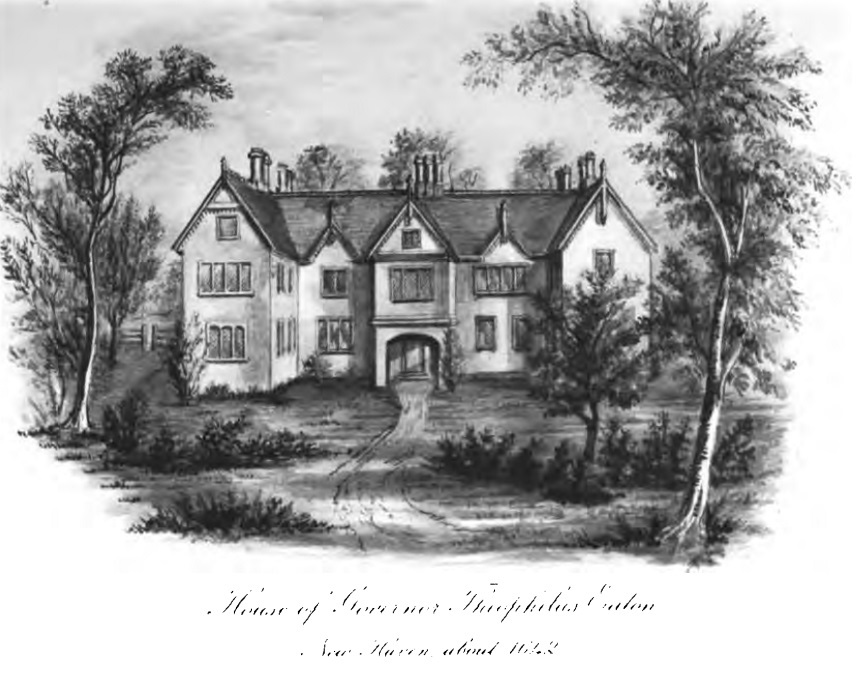
Theophilus Eaton house, New Haven, Connecticut

Theophilus Eaton (c. 1590 — January 7, 1658) was a New England colonist, politician, merchant and financier, who took part in organizing and financing the Great Puritan Migration to America. He was a founder of Massachusetts Bay Colony, and a founder and eventual governor of New Haven Colony. He was also among the founders of Boston, Greenwich, Connecticut, Eaton's Neck, Southold and East Hampton.

His brother, Nathaniel Eaton, became the first headmaster of Harvard college, building Harvard Yard and Harvard Library, and his son, Samuel Eaton, became one of the seven founders of the Harvard Corporation.

== Early life and first marriage ==
He was born at Stony Stratford, Buckinghamshire, England about 1590, to Rev. Richard Eaton and his wife, Elizabeth. His father was a graduate of the University of Oxford in 1599, at Lincoln College, and may have been the curate at that time. He later became in 1607 Prebendary of Lincoln Cathedral and Vicar of Great Budworth, Cheshire. Theophilus married Grace Hiller, and had two daughters, Mary and Elizabeth Eaton, who died young. Grace Hiller died in 1626.

== Second marriage and children ==
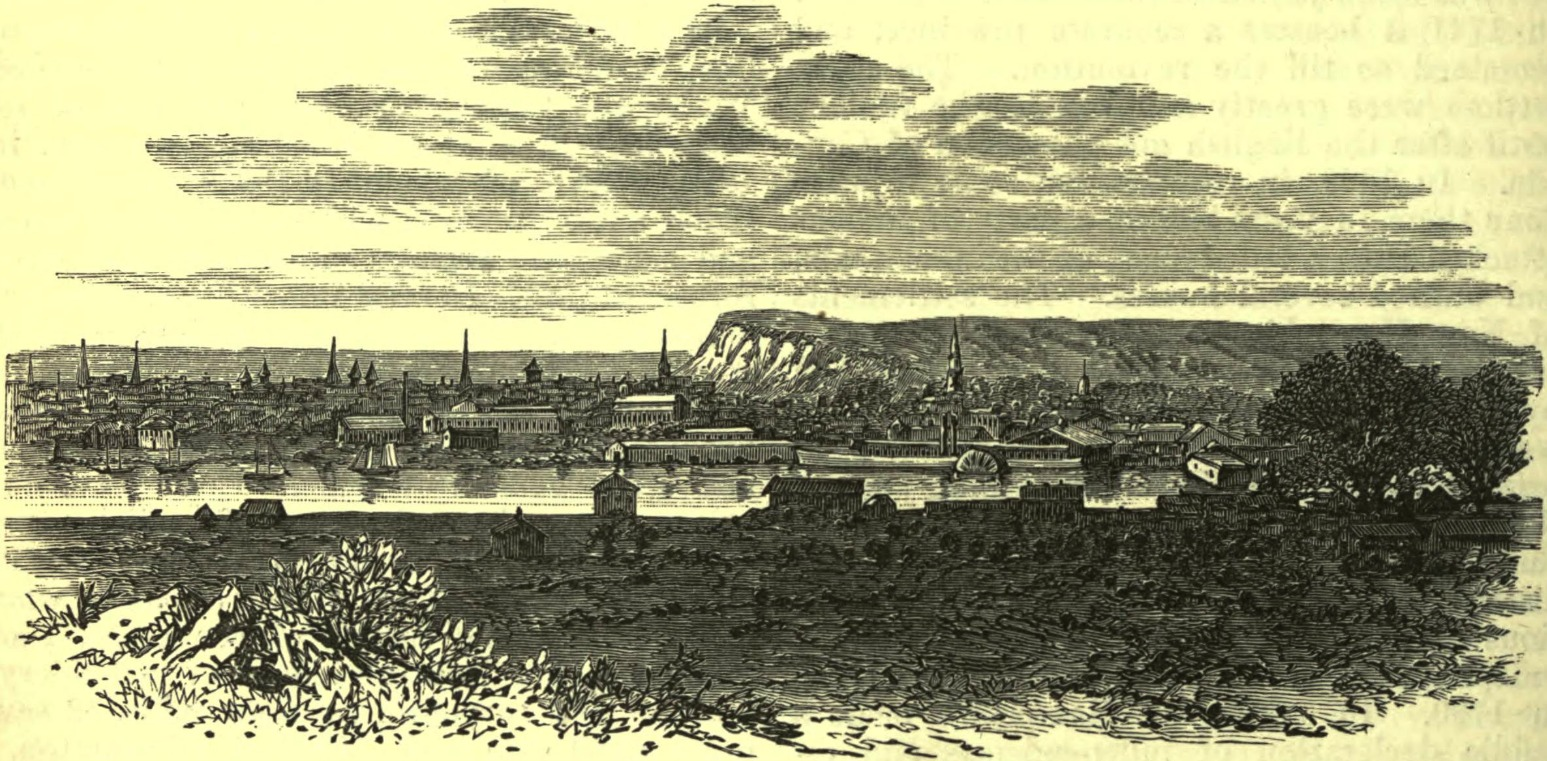
New Haven Colony

In 1627 he remarried, this time to a widow, Anne Yale, who was the daughter of George Lloyd, the Bishop of Chester (some authorities say Anne Morton, the daughter of Bishop Thomas Morton of Chester). Eaton and Anne Yale were the parents of Samuel Eaton (baptized in 1628), Theophilus Jr., Hannah, Jonathan and Elizabeth II (b. 1637), as the previous Elizabeth Eaton died in 1630. They raised eight children in their household. Besides their three, and Mary and Samuel, it included Anne, David, and Thomas Yale from Anne's first marriage to Thomas Yale of the Yale family.

Thomas Yale was a London merchant, son of Chancellor David Yale of Erddig Park, who was the nephew of Chancellor Thomas Yale of London. He was also a grandson of John Lloyd, Judge of the High Court of Admiralty in London, and one of the eight founding Fellows of the first Protestant College of the University of Oxford, Jesus College.

The three Yale children had notable places in the history of Connecticut.

Thomas Yale Jr. settled in Connecticut as a planter and landowner, cofounded New Haven Colony, and signed its Fundamental Agreement on June 4, 1639. His descendants would fight the American War of Independence, become the early settlers of Wallingford and Yalesville, and the founders of a manufacturing dynasty in the region. They would establish number of hotels and banks and start the manufacture of cigars, beer, pelts, wagons, carriages, steamboats, ships, yacht flags, gunpowder engines, Britannia ware, as well as bayonets and muskets Springfield Model 1861, the latter for the Union Army of Abraham Lincoln through Lamson, Goodnow & Yale, family of Linus Yale Sr.

Anne Yale (the daughter) married Gov. Edward Hopkins in 1631; he later became the 2nd Gov. of Connecticut and a Lord Commissioner of the Admiralty for the Lord Protector of Britain, Oliver Cromwell. Her uncle-in-law was Ottoman ambassador Sir Henry Lello, who negotiated with the Venetians and Habsburgs under Elizabeth Tudor.

David Yale, a prosperous Boston merchant and attorney to Robert Rich, 2nd Earl of Warwick, who married Ursula Knight in 1641, became the father of Gov. Elihu Yale, President of the British East India Company settlement in Fort St. George, at Madras and primary benefactor of Yale College.

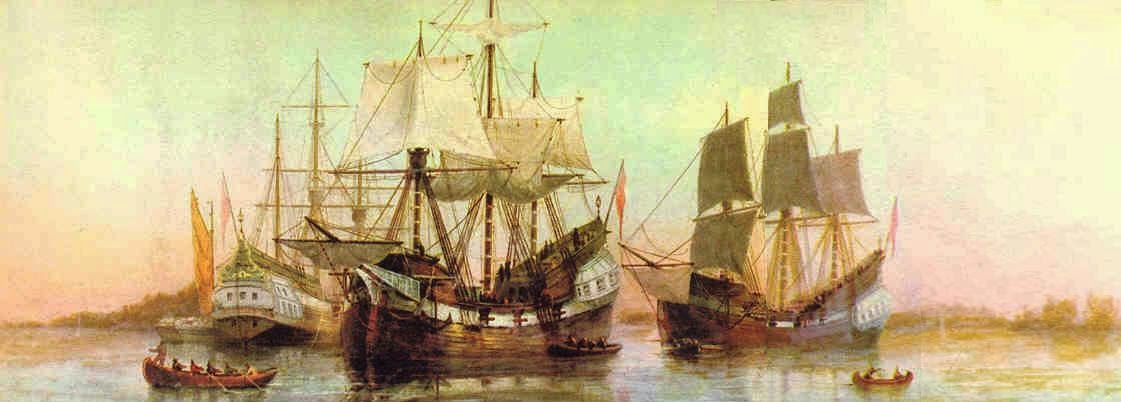
Great Puritan migration to the New England Colonies, Gov. Eaton was one of its financier and proprietor of ships

The Eaton children fared as follows; Mary Eaton married Judge Valentine Hill of Boston, a business associate of William Aspinwall, member of the Artillery Company, signatory of the Oath of a Freeman and real estate developer in 1647. (Gov. Eaton's brother, Nathaniel Eaton, the first Headmaster of Harvard and builder of Harvard's first College was present as a witness.)

Samuel Eaton, who became one of the seven founding members and signatories of the Harvard Corporation by charter in 1650, then, in 1654, married Mabel (Harlakenden) Haynes, widow of John Haynes, 4th Gov. of Massachusetts Bay Colony and later 1st Gov. of Connecticut Colony.

Hannah Eaton, who married William Jones, 24th Lt. Gov. of Connecticut and Magistrate for the United Colonies, in 1659. He and Davenport hosted in secret two regicides from Britain in the Judges' Cave in New Haven.

Theophilus Eaton, Jr., or Ellis, as he was known, who returned to England with his mother after his father's death, settled in Dublin, Ireland, and married Catherine (daughter of Captain Thomas Maunsell and Alphra Crayford) in 1649, and their daughter Anne married her first cousin Colonel Thomas Maunsell. He is ancestor to many members of prominent Anglo-Irish families to this day. Their daughter Elizabeth died in London in March 1637 before the family departed for the colonies.

== Early career in England ==
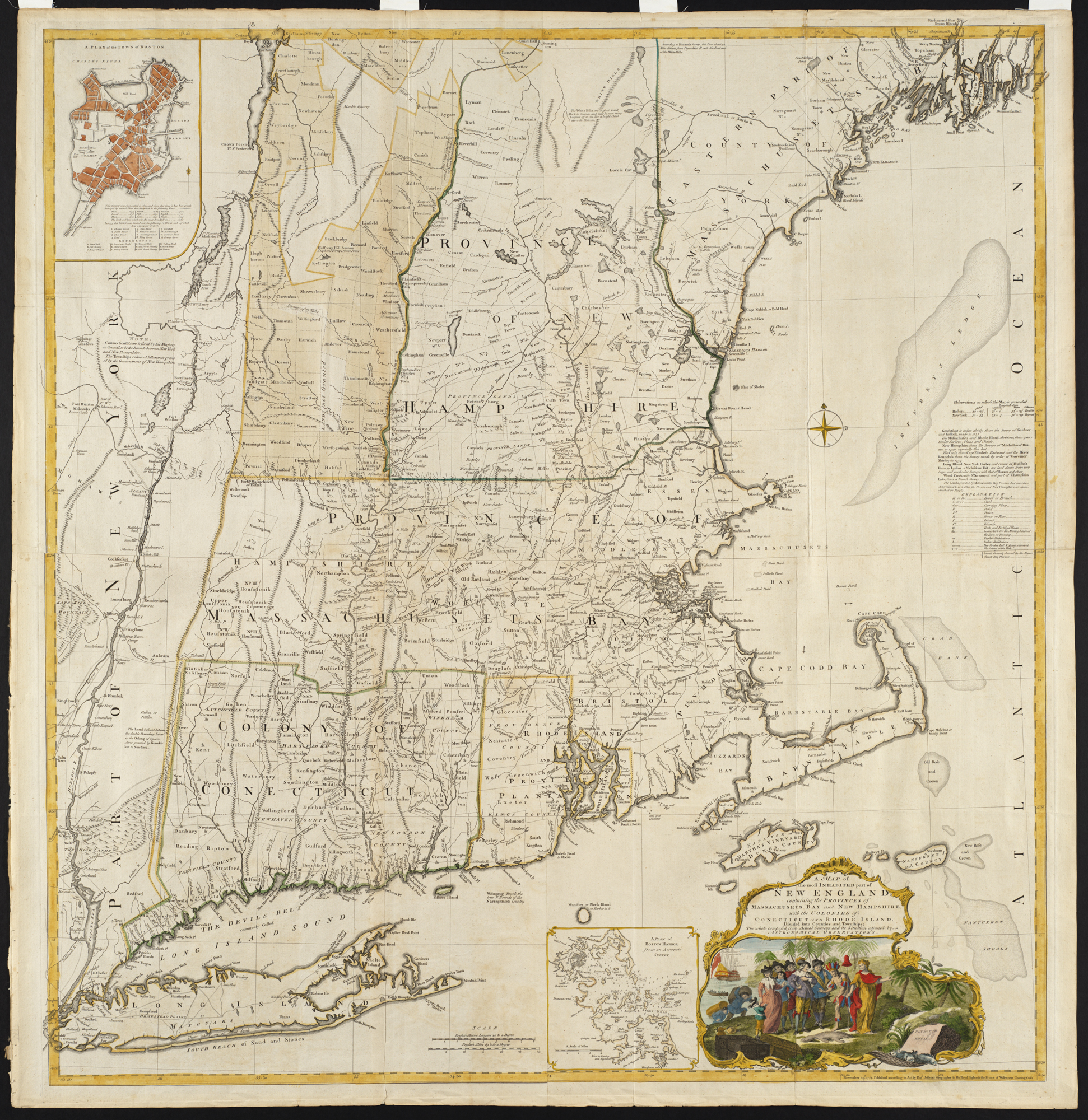
A map of the most inhabited part of New England Colonies

In London, Theophilus resided between Coleman Street and Lothbury Street, and became a member of the Court of Common Council of the City of London Corporation. He purchased with Anne Yale the past home of Sir Richard Saltonstall of the Saltonstall family. For several years, he served as Ambassador and middleman between King James I of England and King Christian IV of Denmark, mostly for the business dealings between these two countries.

Thereafter, he would become Deputy Gov. of the Eastland Company, which was one of the most important English commercial companies of the 17th century. The enterprise traded in the Baltics and Scandinavia, dealing with countries such as Denmark, Norway, Sweden, Prussia and Poland. As his wealth grew, he took great interest in the plans to colonize New England. He would get his chance in 1628. He and a group of shareholders, including Sir Richard Saltonstall and Sir Henry Rosewell, bought the right to colonize the Massachusetts Bay Colony, through a Royal charter made by King Charles I of England.

As one of the cofounders of Massachusetts, he signed its incorporation called the Charter of the Massachusetts Bay Company and they would form a Self-governing colony by creating the Massachusetts General Court, called the Great and General Court at the time and the Massachusetts Governor's Council, called the Council of assistants at the time. This governing body would put the management and defence of the colony in the hands of ten men. Five would have to stay in England, five would go to Massachusetts. Theophilus was one of the five men chosen to govern the Colony from England. To make the trip to the Massachusetts Bay Colony, Governor John Winthrop would use one of the ships that he co-owned, the Arbella, and would make it his flagship to lead the Winthrop Fleet.

Arrived in Massachusetts, they would make Boston their capital, with Theophilus Eaton and Thomas Hooker among its founders. This would start the Puritan migration to New England (1620–1640) and Theophilus would be one of those wealthy city Puritans who financed it. The colony became the largest in New England, and evolved into the Thirteen American Colonies that would later become the United States of America.

== Emigration to New England ==
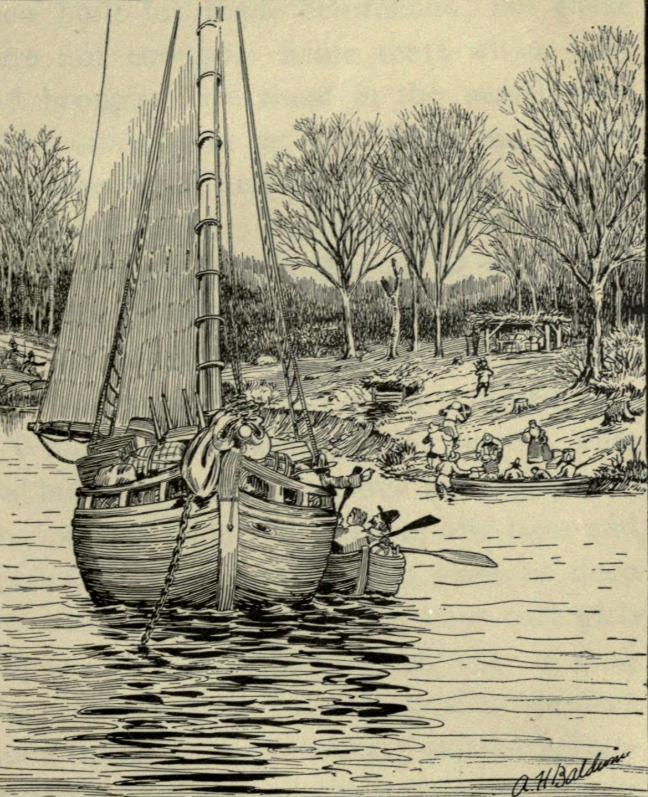
Landing at Quinnipiac, 1638

He later made the trip and emigrated to New England with other Puritans in the ship Hector, arriving in Boston on June 26, 1637.

His group of colonists had his friend John Davenport as their religious leader, brother of Francis Davenport, the chaplain of Queen Catherine of Braganza and Henrietta Maria de Bourbon. They wanted to start their own settlement – probably due in part to the commanding persona of John Winthrop, Governor of the Massachusetts Bay Colony at the time (1637 to 1640, and many other terms). Winthrop was termed "an object of great fear in all the colonies", and caused the Rev. Thomas Hooker and others to go off and form their own colonies as well.

Their beliefs seemed quite strong in retrospect as they would later refuse the request of Oliver Cromwell, the most powerful man in England, to join him in his conquest of Ireland and Spain.

== Foundation of New Haven ==
In the spring his group moved from Boston and when they arrived on April 14, 1638, they named the site New Haven. That fall, Eaton led an exploration to the south, and located a site at Quinnipiack on the northern shore of Long Island Sound. On November 14, 1638, he and his company entered into an agreement with the chief sachem Momauquin agreeing that in exchange for protection from the Quinnipiack Indians' ancient enemies, the Mohawk and the Pequot, Momauquin would relinquish his right, title, and interest to the lands that both parties agreed would not later evolve into feelings of animosity, hate, or regret. [Cf. J. W. Barber, History and Antiquities of New Haven, (Conn.) (1831) pp. 25–29].

1832 map of New Haven by J.W. Barber

The Mohawks and the Pequots had all but wiped out the New Haven Indians, leaving but 40 surviving males, and to that end Theophilus and his company also covenanted to protect them when unreasonably assaulted and terrified, that they would always have a sufficient quantity of land to plant on, and by way of free and thankful retribution that they give to the sachem and his council and company: twelve coats of English cloth, twelve alchemy spoons, twelve hatchets, twelve hoes, two dozen knives, twelve porringers, and four cases of French knives & scissors.

This agreement was signed and legally executed by Momauquin and his council as well as by Theophilus Eaton and John Davenport.

Some still say, however, that Theophilus simply traded thirteen coats to the local Indians for seven townships of land; but what is a fact is that in the following December 1638 he and his company did also purchase the usage of a large area of land from Monotowese, son of the sachem at Mattabeseck, which was 10 miles in length and 13 in breadth. He did pay 13 coats to Monotowese as per their agreement, but again, the English gave the Indians ample grounds to plant on and free usage of all the lands for hunting. Further, even though Monotowese's tribe consisted of but 10 males with their women and children, it was understood that the English would also protect them from the Mohawk and the Pequots.

Upon arrival in the new colony, Theophilus at first attempted to resume his trade as a merchant. He was not successful, however, since the colony was too new to afford imports and the Indian fur trade was more successful at the Dutch outposts at Hartford, so he soon turned to farming. When the New Haven Colony established its administration, he was chosen as one of the "seven pillars of the church" acting as one of the 7 councillors who formed the body of freemen and elected civil officers. Their names were: Theophilus Eaton, John Davenport, Robert Newman, Matthew Gilbert, Thomas Fugill, John Punderson, and Jeremiah Dixon.

== Career as governor ==
Drawing of the back of the house

He was elected as the first governor on June 4, 1639, and reelected each year until his death on January 7, 1657/8 (Julian Calendar timing). He was buried on the green in New Haven and later his remains were removed to Grove Street Cemetery, New Haven. One of his major accomplishments as governor was the creation of a written legal code for the colony in 1655 later to be known as the Blue Laws of Connecticut. For this, and the fact that he was the first president of the Massachusetts Bay Company, he is sometimes thought of as being the Father of American Law, but this is arguably an example of hyperbole.

In 1640, as Governor of the Colony, he acquired from the Siwanoy Indians the town of Greenwich, Connecticut, making him one of its founder. Around 1642, he established the Delaware Company of New Haven, a permanent colony in the Delaware River Valley with the aim of developing the fur trade against the Dutch. Stephen Goodyear of the Goodyear family and other merchants joined the venture. Their claim on this territory brought conflicts with Dutch Governor Willem Kieft and Lord Baltimore of Maryland Colony.

New Haven colony would expand over time with outposts in Connecticut, New Jersey, Delaware, Pennsylvania and New York. In 1641, they acquired the whole Eastern part of Long Island from William Alexander, 1st Earl of Stirling, starting the acquisition as a loan to the Earl. The buyers were Gov. Eaton on behalf of New Haven Colony, Gov. George Fenwick of Saybrook Colony, Gov. Edward Hopkins of Connecticut Colony, Gov. John Haynes, Samuel Wyllys, son of Gov. George Wyllys, Thomas Gregson and Stephen Goodyear. The latter was Eaton's deputy governor and would acquire privately the whole of Shelter Island, New York.

On Long Island, Eaton and his associates would be among the original founders and owners of Southold, New York, with Capt. John Youngs, and of East Hampton in the Hamptons, with his step son-in-law, Gov. Edward Hopkins. The acquisitions of both Southold and East Hampton were initially made by conveyance under Eaton and his associates' own names and capital, keeping the ownership and control of about 30,000 acres (47 square mile) of land for about 3 years until they sold it to the settlers.

== Later career ==
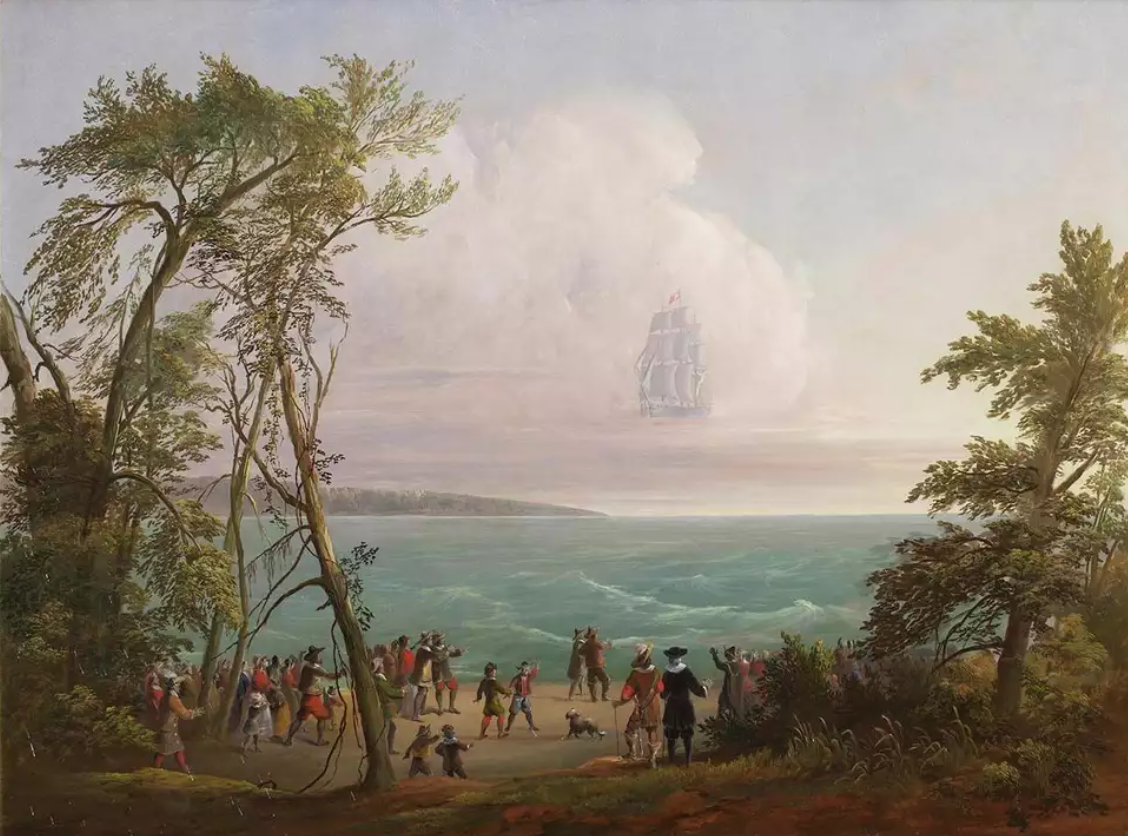
The vision of Eaton's Ghost ship in New Haven, 1647, by artist Jesse Talbot

In 1643, Eaton became a founding Commissioner of the United Colonies of New England, and was joined by Governor Edward Hopkins, the 2nd Governor of Connecticut Colony, to unite the Church and build a military alliance between the New England Colonies. In 1646, he became the first in New England to freed his slaves, more than 100 years before the 1st U.S. President George Washington and Founding Father Benjamin Franklin doing the same. In 1650, he became involved in one of the many disputes with Gov. Peter Stuyvesant, of the Stuyvesant family, over the boundaries of the colonies, adding tension to the Anglo-Dutch relations.

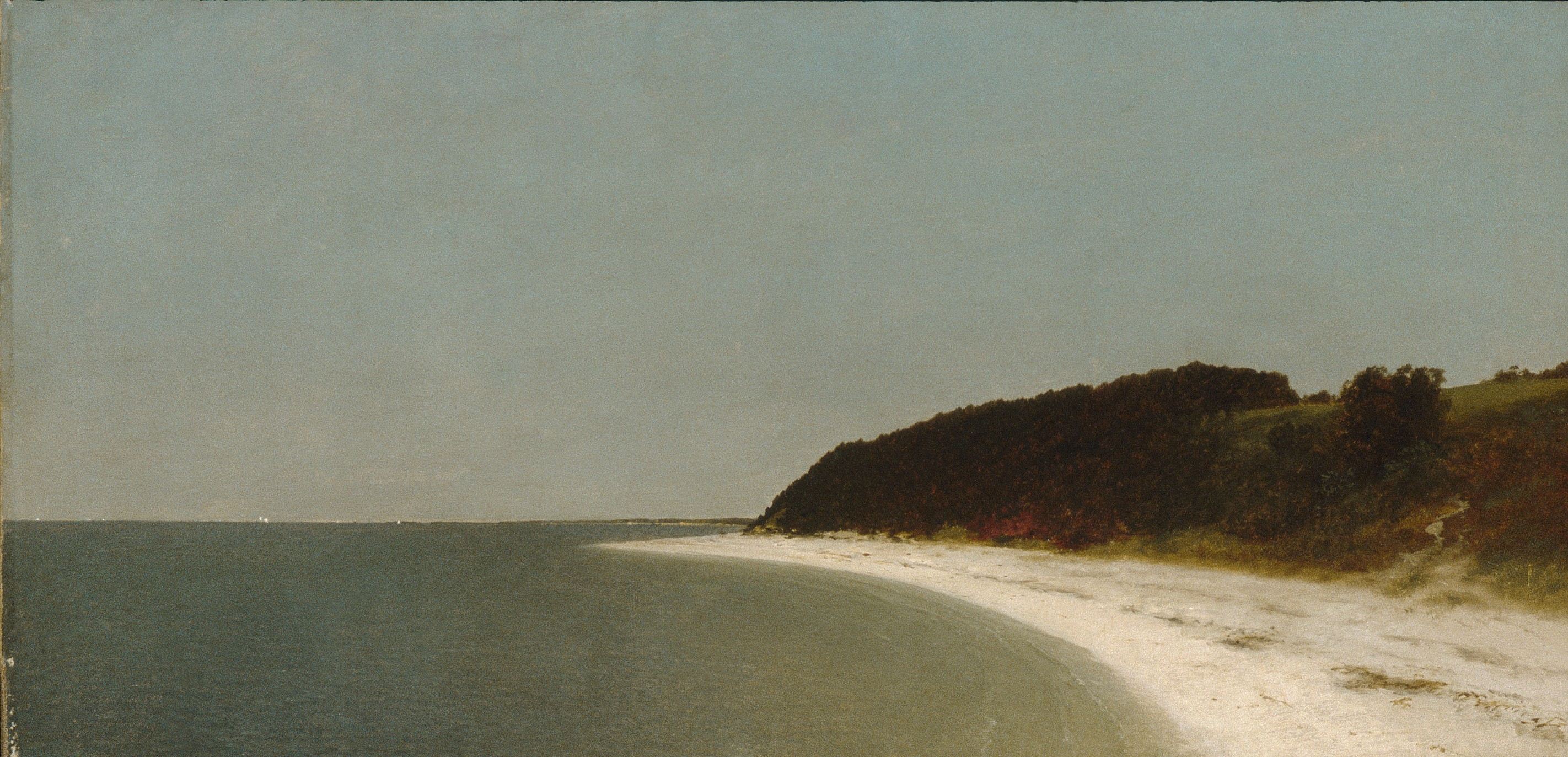
Eaton's Neck, Long Island, New York

The dispute with New Amsterdam concerned the Dutch claims on all the lands bordering Long Island Sound, and the capture of an English ship. Gov. Winthrop got involved and they settled the borders of New Netherland and the English colonies over the Treaty of Hartford. In 1653, he sent his secretary, Francis Newman, to meet Governor Peter Stuyvesant to gain compensation for the English settlers who were in Dutch hands. In 1654, when Davenport became sick, Eaton had the physician of Oliver Cromwell, Dr. Laurence Wright, and Gov. Winthrop, to take the case in their own hands and send him back to England to be cured.

In 1656, he received a letter from Cromwell, at the time Lord Protector (head of state), formally inviting the residents of New Haven Colony to remove to Jamaica, or later Ireland, along with another letter from Maj. Gen. Robert Sedgwick, to which they declined. Mr. Newman would replace Theophilus Eaton as Governor after his death in 1658, with Stephen Goodyear of the Goodyear family as his Deputy Governor.

Eaton's Neck, New York, on Long Island, a peninsula 45 miles from Manhattan, also bear his name. He acquired the land in 1646 from the Matinecock Indians and was the first European to have explored this area. As part of the estate of Gov. Eaton and Anne Yale, the 1500 acres property was inherited by their son, Theophilus Jr., then their daughter Hannah Eaton, the half-siblings of the Yales. In 1686, it became one of the six royal manors of Long Island, becoming The Lordship and Manor of Eaton's Neck. It was granted by Governor Thomas Dongan on behalf of King James II of England, the famous Duke of York who gave his name to the Province and City of New York.

== Siblings ==
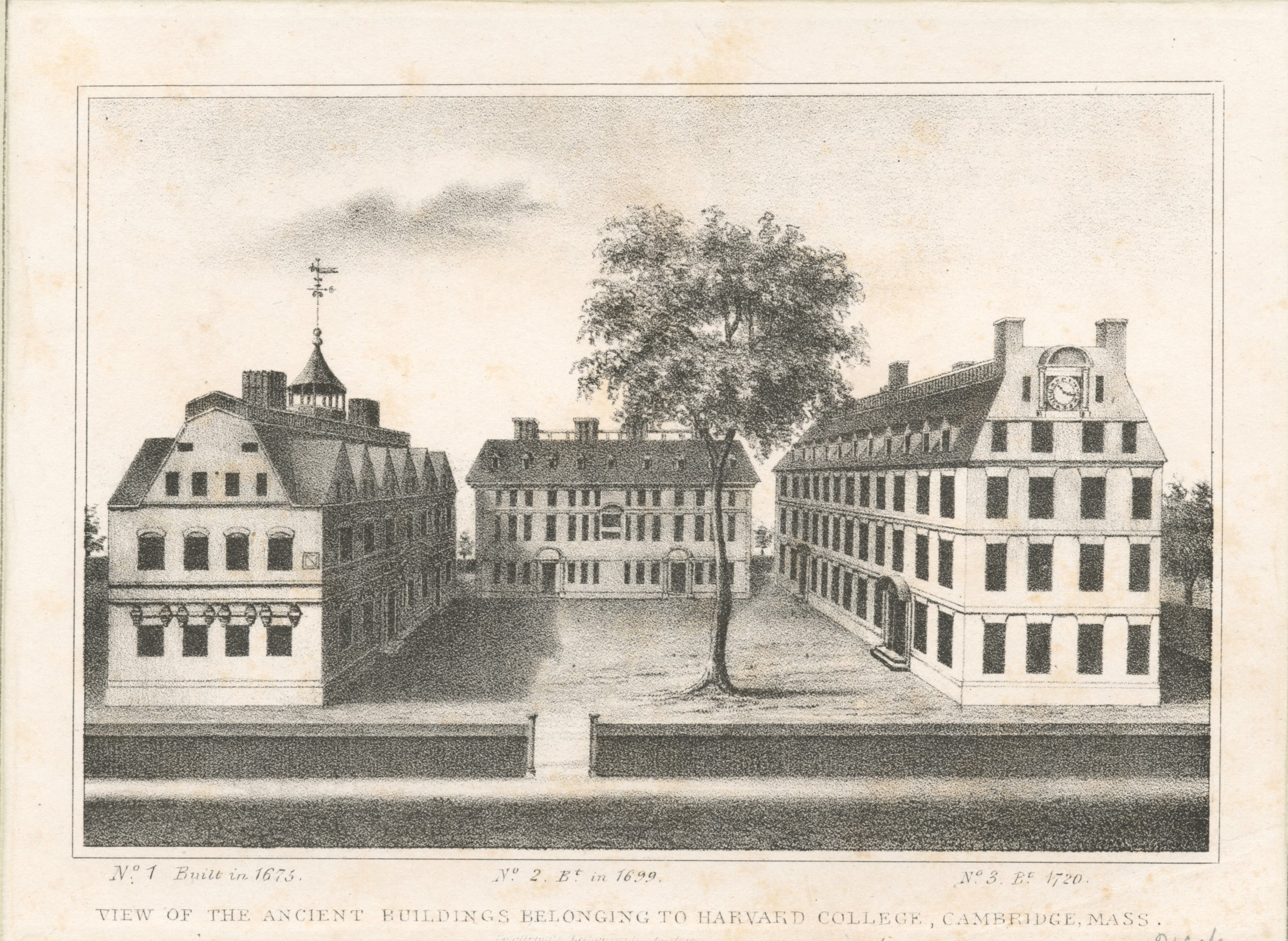
Harvard College in 1673, during the colonial era

Theophilus' younger brother Nathaniel Eaton (1609–1674) was the first Headmaster of Harvard College, and the brother-in-law of Gov. William Stone, family of Founding Fathers Thomas Stone and Daniel of St. Thomas Jenifer. He was deposed in 1639 by the then Governor John Winthrop in what some have considered to be Massachusetts' first Witch Trial. Another brother, Samuel Eaton Sr. (1597–1665), was a Minister who accompanied Theophilus to New Haven, but later returned to England.

Theophilus was a member of the Great and General Court of the Massachusetts Bay Colony when they issued the charter for Harvard. He also gave £40 for the erection of Harvard's first buildings while his brother Nathaniel Eaton was erecting them as superintendent of the college. Governor Eaton, his brother Nathaniel, the first Head, and his son Samuel Jr., one of the seven founders of the Harvard Corporation, were all participants in the founding of Harvard College.

Samuel was admitted at Harvard in 1645, and graduated from a class of five in 1649, before its incorporation in 1650, and began teaching at the institution, just as his uncle Nathaniel was teaching at its foundation. His stepson also attended Harvard. Nathaniel was a friend of John Harvard, who came to the colonies with him from the University of Cambridge.

Eaton's home was the largest in New Haven Colony, and one of the largest in New England at the time, with a total of 21 fireplaces, a household of about 30 people, and an estate covering 3000 acres in New Haven. He also had estates in London and England. The home of Eli Whitney of the Whitney family, now called William Pinto House, would later be on the original estate of Gov. Eaton.

== Epitaph ==
Theophilus' epitaph reads as follows ...

Theophilus Eaton, Esqr. Govr. dec'd Jan'y 7, 1657, Ætat. 67.
Eaton so fam'd, so wise, so just,
The Phœnix of our world, here lies his dust,
This name forget, N. England never must.

== See also ==
- New Haven, Connecticut
- History of Connecticut
- Robert Seeley
- Louisa Caroline Huggins Tuthill
- Descendants of Thomas Yale

== Notes ==
- Yale, Rodney Horace (1908). Yale Genealogy and History of Wales. Beatrice, Nebraska, U.S.A. Milburn & Scott Company. Listed in Worldcat and archived at the Internet Archive.

Political offices
New office	Governor of the New Haven Colony; 1639–58	Succeeded by Francis Newman
