= Middleton F.C. =

Middleton
- Full name: Middleton Association Football Club
- Founded: 1878
- Dissolved: 1902
- Ground: Tonge Springs (1878-1879), Grimshaw Lane (1879-1884), Woodside (1884-1890), Towncroft (1890-1891), Boarshaw Lane (1891-1902)
- Secretary: E. E. Welch
1878 colours	1890 colours

Middleton Association Football Club was a football club from Middleton, Greater Manchester, active in the late 19th century. Formed in 1878, they merged with the newly re-formed Middleton Cricket Club in 1890, before splitting again a year later.

== History ==
Middleton Association Football Club was formed in 1878, and played in the first Lancashire Senior Cup in 1879–80, losing 6–1 to Edgeworth in the first round.

The club continued on throughout the 1880s until eventually were taken over by Middleton Cricket Club in 1890 who had just been reformed, and moved in to their Towncroft ground.

Initially, Middleton Cricket Club had an attempt to take over Tonge F.C rebuffed, which led to them taking over the Middleton club instead. Once the new season was finally underway in their new guise as part of the cricket club, the final of the Manchester Junior Cup was reached in its first season, ending in defeat to Hurst Ramblers.

However, the club was suspended at the end of the 1890–91 season after a complaint by Tonge about Middleton poaching two of its players (Brooks and Powell). The club also found itself homeless, after 15 members of the cricket club moved and passed a motion to stop the club from playing on the cricket pitch over the winter and split the football section from the cricket, on the basis that "it was not safe to play football after a man was 24 years of age", caused lung and heart diseases, and "brought a lot of rabble together".

That led to a suggestion of merging the Middleton and Tonge clubs but the club found a new ground at Boarshaw Lane, Boarshaw instead. The club suffered a further tragedy a few months later, as one of its founders, the 23-year-old Harry Johnson Horsman, died of a seizure at his home, ten years after his brother had been killed playing football. The club was due to join the second season of the original Manchester League in 1891, but pulled out before pre-season, continuing to play friendlies and Manchester Junior Cup games.

The 1891–92 season finished on a high as the club won the Junior Cup for the first time, gaining revenge over Hurst Ramblers at Manchester City's Hyde Road. The club repeated its Junior Cup triumph in 1892–93 and 1894–95, the committee doing Middleton the honour after the latter final of granting a medal to Evans, who had missed the final through injury. However, after the 1895 triumph, Middleton was excluded from the Junior Cup, and forced to play in the Manchester Senior Cup, until the turn of the century.

Middleton first entered the FA Cup in 1894–95, and caused a shock in its first match at Northwich Victoria in the first qualifying round, Hall scoring the only goal of the game from a break with 20 minutes to go, from a Vics corner; the Vics had been a Football League side the previous season, and Middleton also had the luxury of missing a penalty. The club reached the third qualifying round in 1895–96 and 1896–97, in the latter year taking Fairfield to a replay at that stage. The club's best performance in the competition came in 1898–99, when it reached the fourth qualifying round (the penultimate stage), but lost at Stockport County to three second-half goals. Its last entry came in 1899–1900.

The club had joined the original Manchester Federation for the 1892–93 season, and spent the 1894–95 and 1895–96 seasons playing in the Lancashire Alliance, finishing 4th (out of 14) and 7th (out of 12) in the competition. The club was turned down for membership of the Lancashire Combination in 1896–97, so joined The Combination instead, finishing mid-table in its only season. In 1897–98 it joined the Lancashire League. It spent three seasons in the competition, finishing bottom in 1899–1900, whereupon the club left for the Manchester League. However the club's debts were too great to continue at a lower level, and in January 1902, with the club £150 in the red and its landlord threatening Middleton with eviction for non-payment of rent, the club disbanded.

== Colours ==
The first club originally wore all dark blue, with a white star on the jerseys, and changed the knickers to white for its second season. The revived club originally wore white jerseys and blue knickers with white stripes, and as a Lancashire League club wore olive green shirts.

== Ground ==
The original club's first ground was a field at Tonge Springs, using the Church Inn for facilities. The club in their second season played in the Jumbo region of Middleton, part of the wider Tonge area, at a field behind the Primitive Methodist Church, just off Grimshaw Lane. By 1884 the club had moved to the Woodside ground. After being taken over by the cricket club, a new club Parkfield Central were formed to play at Woodside, and Middleton moved in to the Towncroft ground of Middleton CC. After its severing by the cricket club, the football club played at Boarshaw Lane.
