= Lamberton, West Virginia =

Lamberton
- Unincorporated community
- Location within the state of West Virginia Lamberton (the United States)
- Coordinates: 39°16′15″N 81°2′48″W
- Country: United States
- State: West Virginia
- County: Ritchie
- Elevation: 794 ft (242 m)
- Time zone: UTC-5 (Eastern (EST))
  - Summer (DST): UTC-4 (EDT)
- GNIS ID: 1541334

Lamberton is an unincorporated community in Ritchie County, West Virginia, United States.
