= George Lamberton (footballer) =

English footballer (1880-1954)

Personal information
- Full name: George Lamberton
- Date of birth: 24 December 1880
- Place of birth: Rossendale, England
- Date of death: 1954 (aged 74–75)
- Position: Inside forward

Senior career*
Years	Team	Apps	(Gls)
1897–1898	Tonge		
1898–1899	Berry's Association		
1901–1904	Bury	22	(7)
1904–1905	Luton Town		
1905–1906	Clapton Orient	26	(3)
1906–1907	Norwich City		
1907–1908	Bury	0	(0)
1908	Haslingden		
1908	Colne		
1909	Hyde		
1909	Chorley		
Total		48	(10)
- * Club domestic league appearances and goals

George Lamberton (24 December 1880–1954) was an English footballer who played in the Football League for Bury and Clapton Orient.
