= Francis Newman =

English colonist in America (1605-1660)

2nd Governor New Haven Colony
- In office May 1658 – 18 November 1660
- Preceded by: Theophilus Eaton
- Succeeded by: William Leete

Personal details
- Born: 1605 England
- Died: 18 November 1660 (aged 54–55) New Haven Colony, Connecticut
- Spouse: Mary Newman Street Leete
- Occupation: Politician

Francis Newman (c. 1605 – 18 November 1660) was an English colonist in America. He served as Governor of the New Haven Colony from 1658 to 1659.

== Early life and career ==
Newman was born in England in 1605 and married Mary Newman Street Leete in 1630 when he was twenty-five. He emigrated to New Hampshire in 1634, but shortly thereafter moved to the Connecticut valley.

Newman was prominent in the affairs of the colony at New Haven, becoming ensign in the trained band in June, 1642. He was made surveyor of roads and bridges on 21 October 1644. He rose to Deputy and Lieutenant of Artillery on 31 March 1645; interim secretary on 10 March 1646; and Deputy for Jurisdiction and Secretary on 18 October 1647. He became Magistrate on 25 May 1653. In 1653, he was one of the commissioners sent from the Connecticut River towns to Manhattan to demand reparation of Peter Stuyvesant, Governor of New Netherland, for injuries sustained by the English colonists at the hands of the Dutch. In July, 1654, he became one of the commissioners of the United Colonies of New England.

In May 1658, Newman succeeded Eaton as Governor of the New Haven Colony, and served until his death.

== Death ==
Newman died on 18 November 1660. Location of his remains is unknown.

Political offices
| Preceded by Theophilus Eaton | Governor of the New Haven Colony; 1658–60 | Succeeded by William Leete |
