= John Davenport (minister) =

Early English colonist in North America

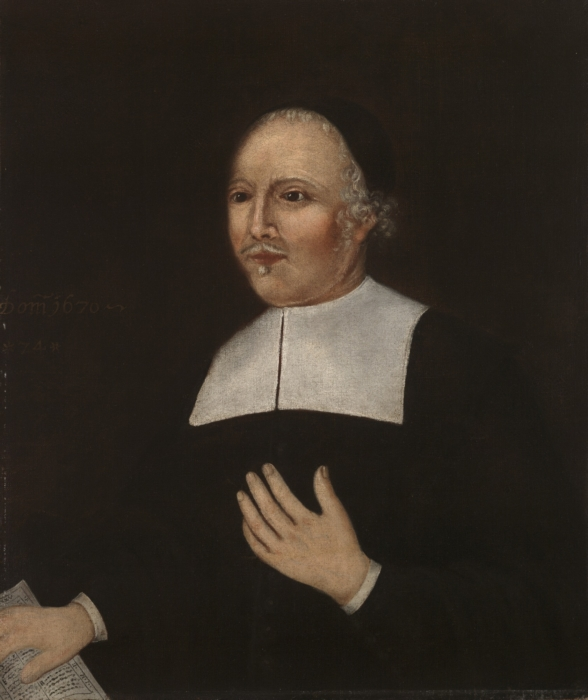
Portrait of John Davenport, 1670. Yale University Art Gallery

John Davenport (April 9, 1597 – May 30, 1670) was an English Puritan clergyman and co-founder of the American colony of New Haven.

== Early life ==
Coat of Arms of John Davenport

Born in Coventry, Warwickshire, England to a wealthy family, Davenport was educated at Oxford University. He matriculated at Merton College in 1613 but migrated to Magdalen Hall two years later, probably because of its reputation at the time for its Calvinist and Puritan sympathies. However, Davenport did not complete his degree during this time, returning to Oxford in 1625 when he took the degrees of BD and MA.

His father was Henry Davenport (1567 – May 29, 1627), draper, alderman, and mayor of Coventry, son of Edward Davenport, mayor of Coventry (1551-2). His mother was Winifred Barnaby (1569 - April 12, 1597).

His brother was the Catholic theologian Francis Davenport, chaplain to Queens Catherine of Braganza and Henrietta Maria de Bourbon.

== Career ==
After serving as chaplain of Hilton Castle, he became curate of St Lawrence Jewry in London. In 1624, he was chosen vicar of St. Stephen's Church, in Coleman Street, London. He became an associate of John Preston, a leading Puritan teacher and scholar, and edited his works for posthumous publication. His efforts to organize the re-purchase of "lay-impropriations" for the support of rural clergy were frustrated by Bishop William Laud and condemned by the Court of Exchequer, as were also his efforts for the relief of Reformed clergy displaced by war in the Electorate of the Palatinate. In 1633 he resigned from the established church to become a Nonconformist pastor and moved to Holland.

In 1637, he acquired the patent for a colony in Massachusetts and sailed with much of his congregation for Boston. While staying in Boston with Reverend John Cotton in March 1638, he sat during the church trial of Anne Hutchinson which resulted in her excommunication from the Boston church, ending the Antinomian Controversy. Later that month he co-founded the Colony of New Haven along with his classmate, Theophilus Eaton, a wealthy merchant from London who became the colony's first governor. He was a large proponent of education in his colony and is often credited with the co-founding of Hopkins School. As a burgess, he was an important figure in the colony up until his departure to Boston in 1668. He unsuccessfully opposed the incorporation of the New Haven colony into the reorganized colony of Connecticut under a royal charter in 1667.

Davenport was a lifelong advocate of the rigorous Puritan standards for church membership and for the strict qualifications for infant baptism, which he believed should be administered only to the children of full church members. His time in Holland had been disrupted by a controversy with his supervising pastor John Paget over this issue, and it led to his withdrawal from the Puritan church in Amsterdam. In New England, he was a staunch opponent of the recommendations made by the Synod of 1662, known as the Half-Way Covenant, which proposed that the children of "half-way" members (those who had been baptized as infants but who had not given evidence of a "conversion" and been admitted to full membership) be allowed to receive baptism.

In September 1667, after the death of their pastor, John Wilson, the First Church in Boston invited Davenport to be their new pastor. A minority in that church opposed the invitation, objecting to his rejection of the compromise on infant baptism. Convention required that Davenport secure a release from his former congregation before accepting a new post, and the church in New Haven was reluctant to let him go. Still, he moved to Boston in the spring of 1668, and eventually produced excerpts of a letter from the New Haven church that appeared to grant his release. He was installed as pastor of the First Church in December 1668, but a faction opposed to his appointment sought to withdraw from the church to form a new congregation. A council of clergy from local churches endorsed their request, and they formed the Third (or Old South) Church in May 1669. On May 19, 1669, Davenport preached the Election Sermon before the General Court in Boston, using the occasion to condemn the actions of "Councils" that interfered with the liberty and administration of individual congregations. Perhaps instigated by this sermon, the Deputies (the lower house of the General Court) named a commission to investigate the actions of the founders of the Third Church and the ministers who had endorsed the separation. However, the Assistants (the upper house) blocked any action, including the publication of Davenport's sermon at public expense. Later that summer, it was discovered that the release letter from New Haven had been severely redacted to give an impression that was not perhaps warranted, though Davenport's First Church rejected charges that they had been misrepresented.

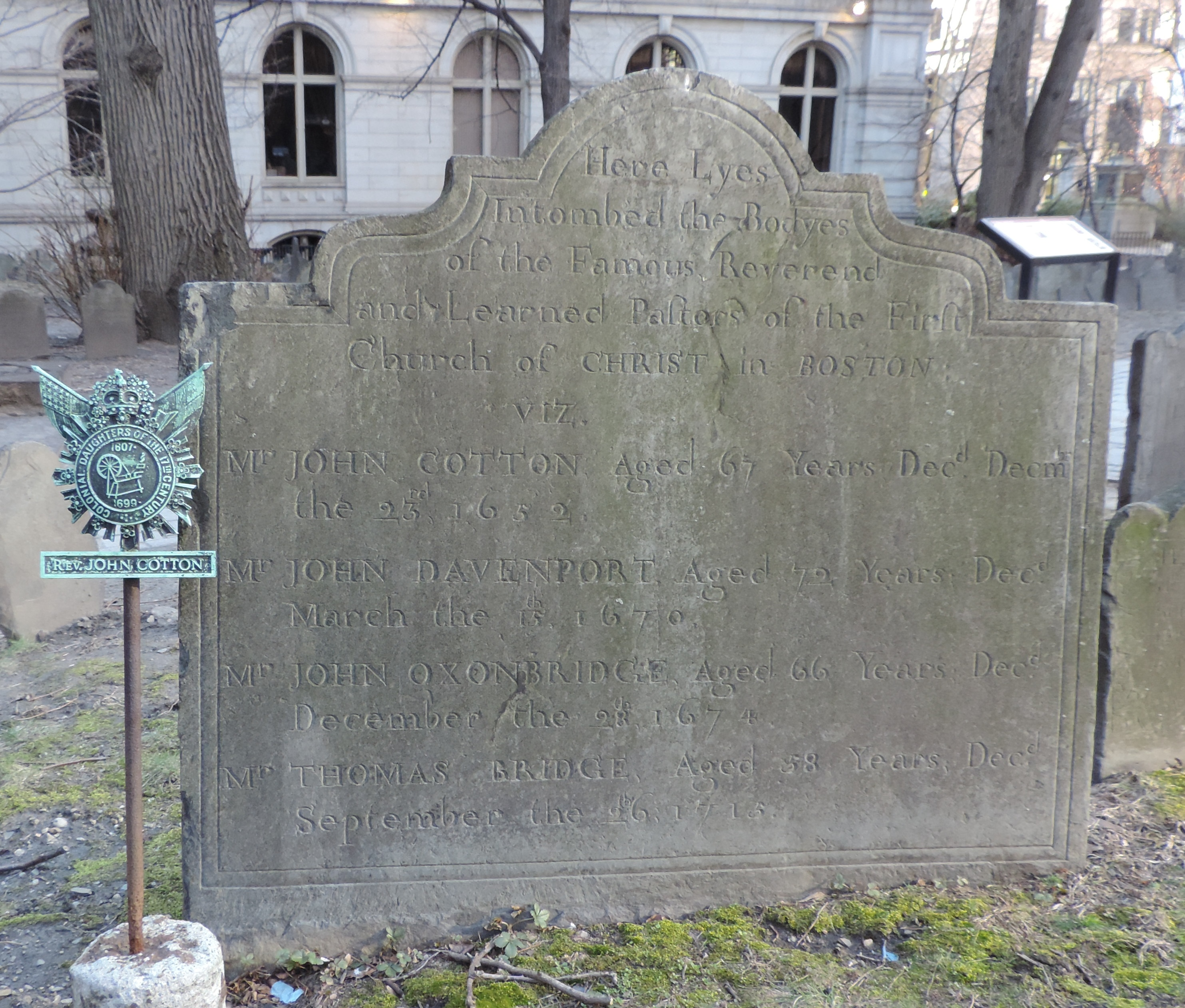
Cenotaph for Davenport and John Cotton.

Davenport's appointment to the leading church in New England and his inflammatory election sermon brought to a head the simmering disagreements over the compromise settlement of the Half-way Synod. But Davenport died the following year; Increase Mather, the other leading Anti-Synodist, experienced a change of heart; and Synodist deputies swept the election of 1671, ending the temporary crisis.

Davenport died in Boston of apoplexy on March 15, 1670, and was buried in the same tomb as John Cotton in King's Chapel Burying Ground, Boston.

== Legacy ==
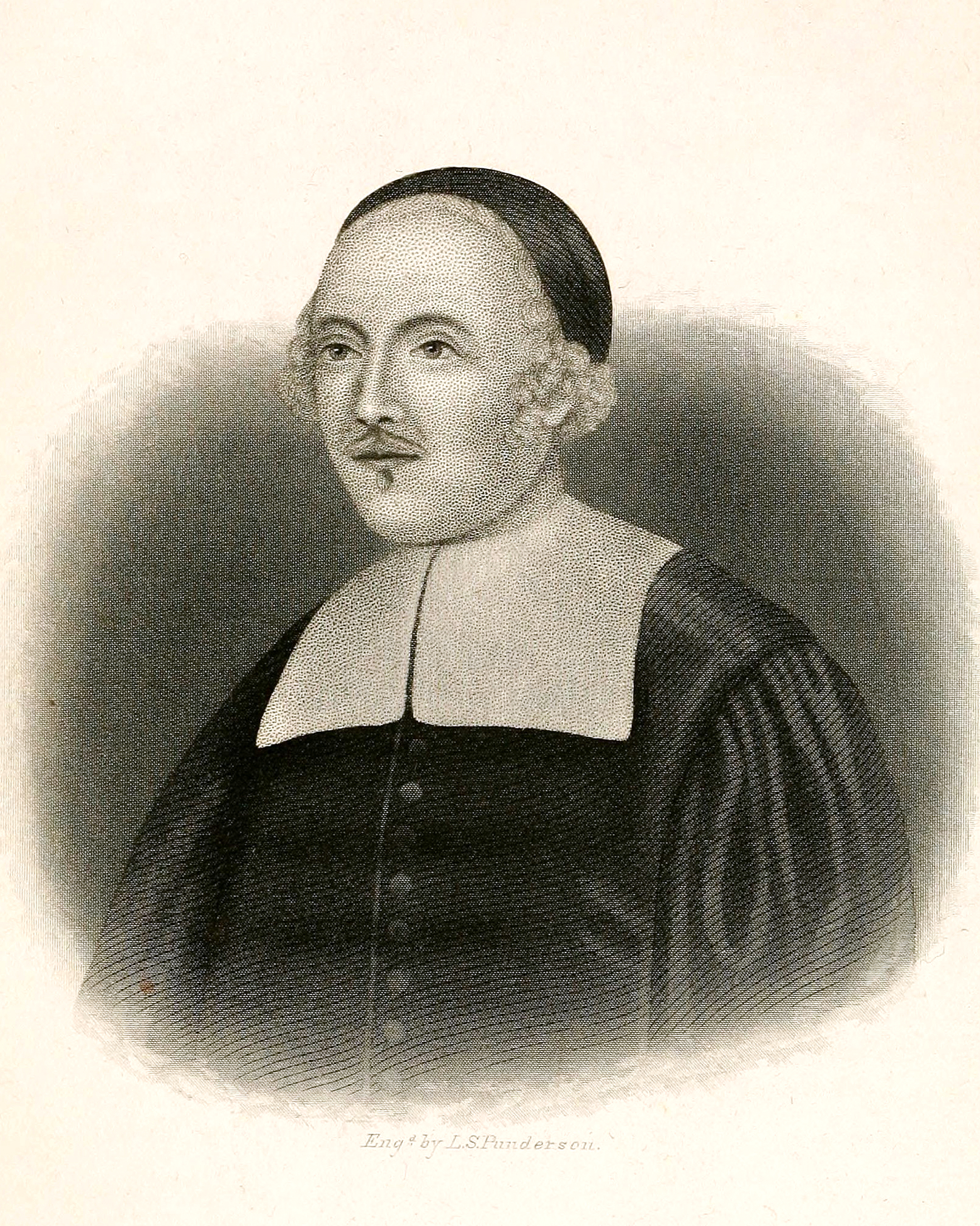

Yale University was envisioned by Davenport, although his proposal for it would not be realized until some 30 years after his death. Davenport College is named in his honor and an oil portrait of him (above) is in the Yale collection. He was also instrumental in the founding of Hopkins School, a grammar school, in 1660.

Notable descendants include James Davenport (clergyman); Abraham Davenport (of John Greenleaf Whittier's "Dark Day" poem); brothers John and James Davenport, who were Congressmen; Claude Davenport; Archibald Cox, the Watergate Special Prosecutor; and Maxwell Perkins, the editor.

== See also ==
- New Haven, Connecticut
- History of Connecticut
- Robert Seeley
