= New Haven Colony =

English colony in North America between 1637 and 1664

- 1638–1664
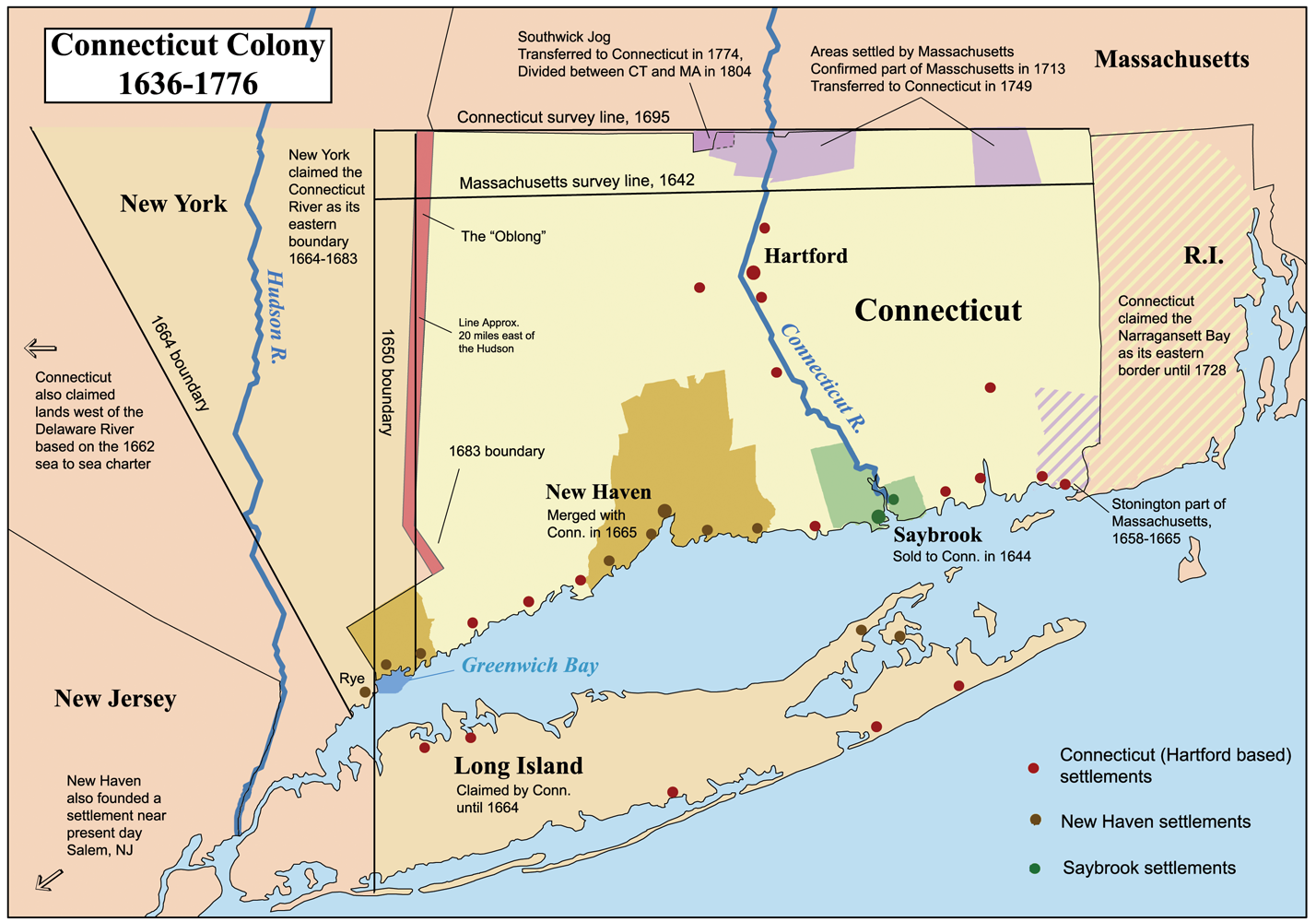
- Map of the Connecticut, New Haven, and Saybrook colonies
- Status: Self-governing colony
- Capital: New Haven
- Common languages: English
- Religion: Puritanism
- Governor
  - 1639-1658: Theophilus Eaton
  - 1658-1659: Francis Newman
  - 1661-1664: William Leete
- Legislature: General Court
- History
  - Established: 1638
  - Merged with Connecticut Colony: 1664
- Currency: Pound sterling
Preceded by	Succeeded by
Quinnipiac	Connecticut Colony
- Today part of: United States; ∟Connecticut

New Haven Colony was an English colony from 1638 to 1664 that included settlements on the north shore of Long Island Sound, with outposts in modern-day New York, New Jersey, Pennsylvania, and Delaware. The colony joined Connecticut Colony in 1664.

The history of the colony was a series of disappointments and failures. The most serious problem was that New Haven Colony never had a charter giving it legal title to exist. The larger, stronger colony of Connecticut to the north did have a charter. New Haven's leaders were businessmen and traders, but they were never able to build up a large or profitable trade because their agricultural base was poor, farming the rocky soil was difficult, and the location was isolated.

== History ==
In 1637, a group of London merchants and their families moved to Boston with the intention of creating a new settlement. The leaders were John Davenport, a Puritan minister, and Theophilus Eaton, a wealthy merchant who brought £3,000 to the venture. Both had experience in fitting out vessels for the Massachusetts Bay Company. The two ships that they chartered arrived in Boston on June 26, 1637. They learned about the area around the Quinnipiac River from militia engaged in the Pequot War, so Eaton set sail to view the area in late August. The site seemed ideal for trade, with a good port lying between Boston and the Dutch city of New Amsterdam on Manhattan and good access to the furs of the Connecticut River valley settlements of Hartford and Springfield.

Eaton returned to Boston, leaving seven men to remain through the winter and make preparations for the arrival of the rest of the company. The main body of settlers landed on April 14, 1638, numbering about 250, with the addition of some from Massachusetts. A number of the early dwellings were caves or "cellers", partially underground and carved into hillsides.

=== Founding as Quinnipiac ===
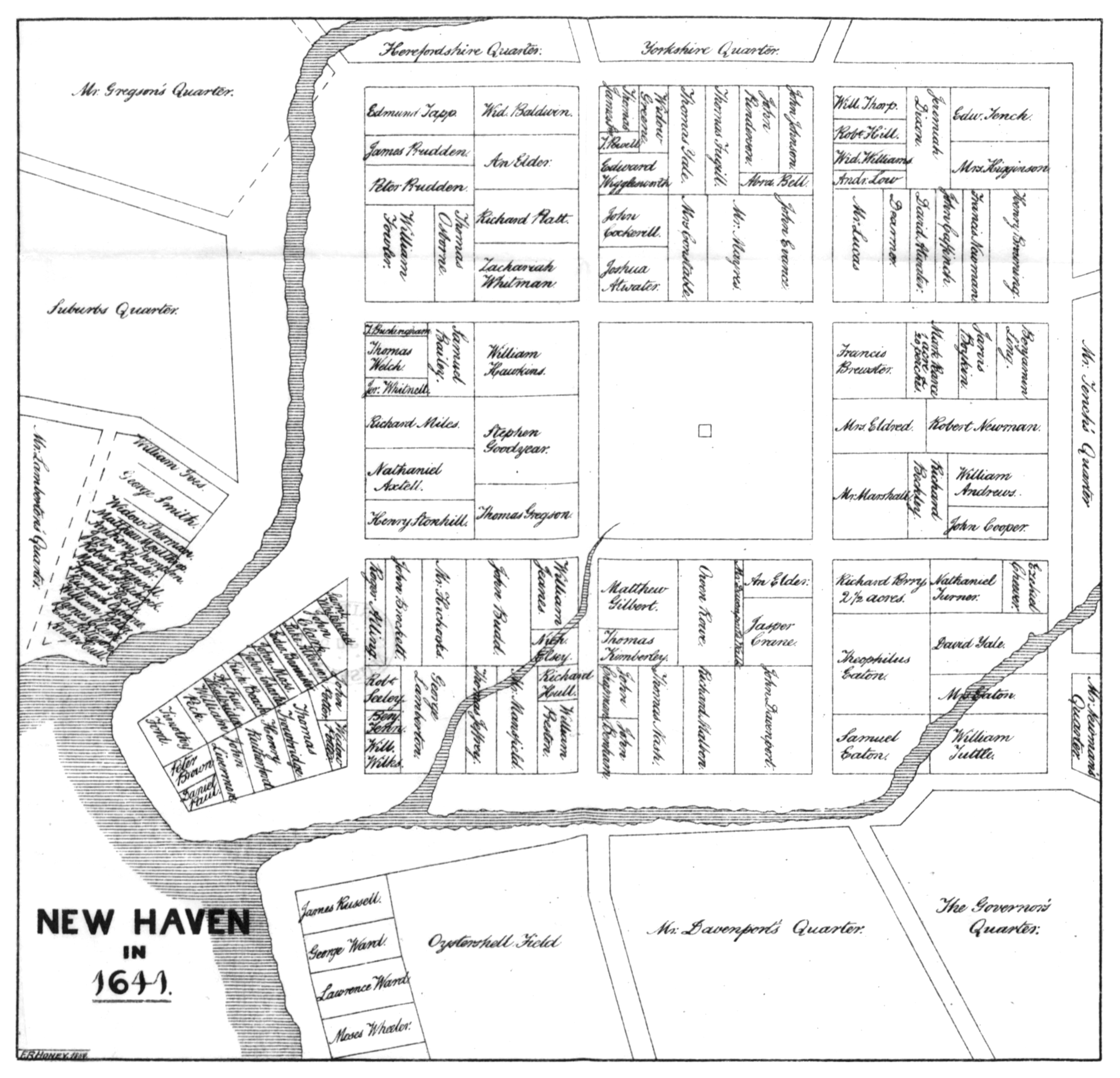
A 19th-century map showing New Haven in 1641, featuring the town's nine-square plan with the Green and meeting house at its center.

The first English settlers gave their settlement the name Quinnipiac (rendered in various spellings, including "Quinipiek" in local records from the time). The name lasted until September 1, 1640 (O.S.), when records of the plantation's general court note "This towne now named Newhaven [sic]."

The settlers had no official charter. Historian Edward Channing describes them as squatters, whereas author Edward Atwater holds that a land purchase from the local natives had been effected sometime before their arrival in April, although no written deed was signed until November 24, 1638. A second deed was made December 11, 1638 for a ten-by-thirteen-mile (16 by 21 km) tract north of the first purchase.

=== Fundamental Agreement ===
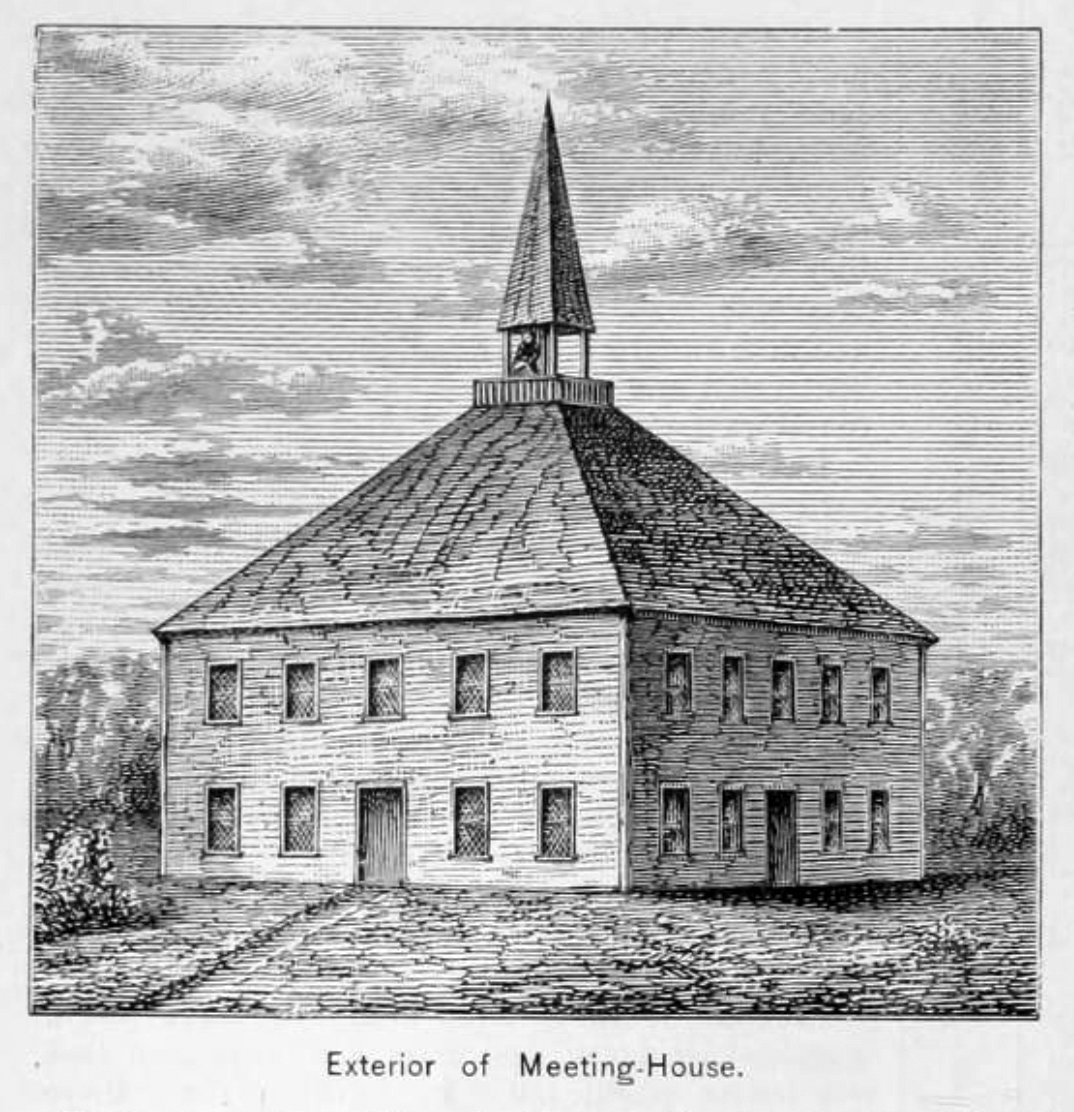
A 19th-century engraving of the first New Haven meeting house, which was in use from 1639 to 1670.

On October 25, 1639, the colonists adopted a "Fundamental Agreement" for self-government, partly as a result of a similar action in the Connecticut Colony. According to its terms, a court composed of 16 burgesses, i.e. voting citizens, was established to appoint a magistrate and officials and to conduct the business of the plantation. The only eligible voters were "planters" who were members of "some or other of the approved Churches of New England". This excluded indentured servants, temporary residents, and transient persons, who were considered to have no permanent interest in the community.

They further determined "that the word of God shall be the only rule to be attended unto in ordering the affairs of government in this plantation." Theophilus Eaton was chosen as the first Magistrate. As the Bible contains no reference to trial by jury, the colonists eliminated it and the magistrate sat in judgment.

This is said to have been one of "the first examples in history of a written constitution organizing a government and defining its powers."

=== Formation of New Haven Colony ===
The plantation (or town) soon had neighboring settlements established by other groups of Puritans from England.:

- Nearby, two settlements independent of Quinnipiac formed: the settlement at Wepowauge (later known as Milford) by a land grant to English settlers from the Paugusset on February 12, 1639 and at Menunkatuck (later known as Guilford) by land grant to English settlers from the Quinnipiac on September 29, 1639.
- Settlers from New Haven established Rippowam (later known as Stamford) and Southold on the North Fork of Long Island in 1640.
- In about 1640, New Haven bought the land that became Greenwich from the Siwanoy Indians. Through the intrigues of Dutch Gov. Peter Stuyvesant, the first inhabitants revolted with the Dutch.

On October 23, 1643, in the context of the formation of the New England Confederation, composed of Massachusetts Bay, Plymouth and Connecticut Colonies, for joint military action against threats of attack by natives, the New Haven Plantation and its subsidiary settlements, Stamford and Southhold on Long Island, were combined with the independent towns of Milford and Guilford and named the New Haven Colony which then joined the Confederation. The town of Branford was settled in 1644 by residents from Wethersfield, Connecticut Colony, who were dissatisfied with the theocratic rule there. They joined the New Haven Colony. Eaton served as governor of the new colony until his death in 1658.

=== Expansion of the Colony ===
In 1641, the colony claimed the area that is now South Jersey and Philadelphia after buying land south of Trenton along the Delaware River from the Lenape tribe. Cape May, New Jersey and Salem, New Jersey were among the communities that were founded.

The treaty with the Lenape placed no westward limit on the land west of the Delaware, which became the legal basis for a Connecticut "sea to sea" claim of owning all the land on both sides of the Delaware from the Atlantic Ocean to the Pacific Ocean. This set the stage for the Pennamite-Yankee War of 150 years later.

In 1642, 50 families on a ship captained by George Lamberton settled at the mouth of Schuylkill River to establish the trading post at what is today Philadelphia. The Dutch and Swedes who were already in the area burned their buildings, and a court in New Sweden convicted Lamberton of "trespassing, conspiring with the Indians." The New Haven Colony did not get any support from its New England patrons, and Puritan Governor John Winthrop testified that the "Delaware Colony" "dissolved" owing to "sickness and mortality."

=== Phantom ship legend ===
With no ships of its own, the colony had to do all of its trade through Massachusetts. Accordingly Theophilus Eaton commissioned the construction of a 150-ton trade ship for the colony. The ship was quite poorly constructed but nonetheless after some difficulty was sent out of the Long Island Sound and off to England. The ship would never be seen again. According to Cotton Mather in his Magnalia Christi Americana, the settlers gathered on the beach where they saw a detailed vision of a ship in the aftermath of a storm. The fate of the ship was depicted in Henry Wadsworth Longfellow's 1847 poem "The Phantom Ship".

=== Harboring the regicide judges ===
In 1660, following the Stuart Restoration, Edward Whalley and his son-in-law William Goffe, two of the 59 commissioners who signed the 1649 execution warrant of Charles I, fled England to North America. They sought protection from agents of Charles II, who intended to bring them to justice. In 1661 they arrived in New Haven which was populated by Roundhead supporters. John Davenport arranged for them to hide in the hills northwest of the town. They purportedly took refuge in a rock formation in present-day West Rock Ridge State Park. Another regicide commissioner, John Dixwell, joined them at a later time.

Three Judges' Cave today bears a historical marker in their name.

=== Merger with Connecticut Colony ===
New Haven urgently needed a royal charter, but the colony had made enemies in London by hiding and protecting the regicide judges. An uneasy competition ruled New Haven's relations with the larger and more powerful Connecticut River settlements centered on Hartford. New Haven published a complete legal code in 1656, but the law remained very much church-centered. A major difference between the New Haven and Connecticut colonies was that the Connecticut Colony permitted other churches to operate on the basis of "sober dissent", while the New Haven Colony only permitted the Puritan church to exist. A royal charter was issued to Connecticut in 1662, ending New Haven's period as a separate colony, and its towns were merged into the government of Connecticut Colony on the recommendation of the Royal Commission of 1664.

== Founding of Newark ==
A group of New Haven colonists led by Robert Treat and others moved to establish a new community in New Jersey in 1666, seeking to maintain the Puritan religious exclusivism and theocracy that was lost with the New Haven Colony's merger with Connecticut Colony. Treat wanted to name the new community after Milford, Connecticut. However Abraham Pierson was to urge that the new community be named "New Ark" for "New Ark of the Covenant" or "New Work" which was to evolve into the name Newark, New Jersey.

== See also ==
- History of Connecticut
- Robert Seeley
