= Dwight Deere Wiman =

American dramatist

- Born: August 8, 1895; Moline, Illinois, US
- Died: January 20, 1951 (aged 56); Hudson, New York, US
- Resting place: Riverside Cemetery; Moline, Illinois; 41.50780°N 90.49190°W
- Education: Yale University
- Occupations: Actor; playwright; director; producer
- Known for: Broadway Producer
- Spouse: Dorothea Stephens (? – 1946; divorced)

Dwight Deere Wiman (August 8, 1895 – January 20, 1951) was an American silent movie actor, playwright and theatrical director. He is best known as a Broadway producer.

== Biography ==
=== Early life and education ===
Wiman was born in Moline, Illinois, one of two boys born to William Wiman (son of Erastus Wiman and Eleanor née Galbrith/Erastus was the son of Erastus Wiman and Therese Amelia née Matthews) and Anna Deere, a granddaughter of John Deere. His granduncle was architect Merton Yale Cady of the Yale family. His mother died in 1906 and after his grandfather, Charles Deere, died the following year he, his father and his brother, Charles Deere Wiman, went to live with his grandmother on her estate in Moline, which was named "Overlook". His grandmother died in 1913 and his father died in 1914. He and his brother were cared for by his uncle and aunt, William and Katherine Butterworth who lived across the street. Both his grandfather, uncle and brother served as president of Deere & Company. He was sent to Todd Seminary for Boys in Woodstock, Illinois, for school. He served in the military during World War I and studied drama under Monty Woolley at Yale University.

=== Career ===
He spent two years working for Deere & Company before he and a couple of his friends organized an independent film production company, Film Guild, in Astoria, Queens from 1920 to 1924. He acted in three silent movies during this time. The film company suffered from marketing difficulties and it dissolved.

In 1925 he started a partnership with William A. Brady Jr. They produced plays such as Lucky Sam McCarver (1925), the revivals of Little Eyolf and The Two Orphans in 1926, The Road to Rome (1927), and The Little Show (1929). Their working relationship ended amicably in 1929 as Wiman was the only one interested in musical theater. Between 1930 and 1951 he produced more than 50 shows. The more significant productions include: The Vinegar Tree (1930), Gay Divorce (1932), She Loves Me Not (1933), On Your Toes (1936), Babes in Arms (1937), On Borrowed Time (1938), I Married an Angel (1938), Morning's at Seven (1939), By Jupiter (1942), and The Country Girl (1950).

Wiman also directed works by Paul Osborn, John Van Druten, and Clifford Odets among others. He had a long association with Rodgers and Hart. During World War II he served as the director of entertainment for the Red Cross in Great Britain.

=== Personal life and death ===
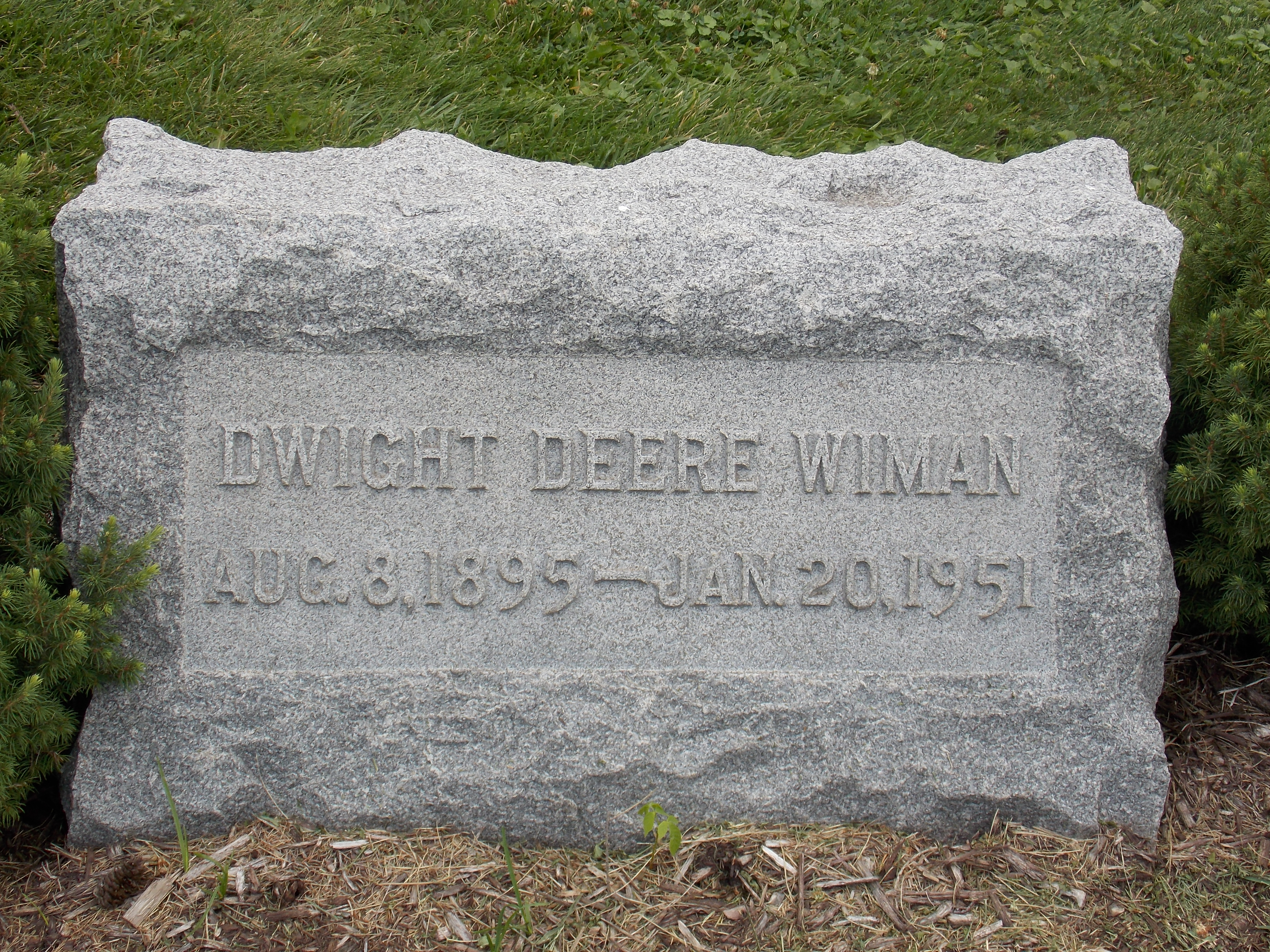
Wiman's grave in Riverside Cemetery

Wiman was married to Dorothea Stephens. The couple divorced in 1946. He died in Hudson, New York, in 1951 at the age of 56 and was buried in Riverside Cemetery in Moline.

== Filmography ==
Wiman acted in the following silent films:

- Youthful Cheaters (1923), as Dexter French
- Puritan Passions (1923) as Richard Talbot
- Peter Stuyvesant (1924) as Charles II of England

== Stage productions ==
Wiman was the producer, director or writer for the following stage productions:

- Ostriches (1925), producer
- Lucky Sam McCarver (1925), producer
- Little Eyolf, (1926), producer
- The Masque of Venice (1926), producer
- Devils (1926), producer
- The Two Orphans (1926), producer
- Seed of the Brute (1926), producer
- Hangman's House (1926), producer
- The Road to Rome (1927), producer
- The Dark (1927), producer
- House of Shadows (1927), producer
- Women Go On Forever (1927), producer
- The Command to Love (1927), producer
- The Queen's Husband (1928), producer
- The Road to Rome (1928), producer
- The Grey Fox (1928), producer
- The Jealous Moon (1928), producer
- A Most Immoral Lady (1928), director, producer
- Judas, (1929), producer
- Paolo and Francesca (1929), producer
- The Little Show (1929), producer, director
- Jenny (1929), producer
- The Second Little Show (1930), writer, director, producer
- The Vinegar Tree (1930), producer
- The Third Little Show (1931), writer, producer
- After All! (1931), producer
- Gay Divorce (1932), producer
- Bad Manners (1933), producer, director
- Champagne, Sec (1933), producer
- She Loves Me Not (1933), producer
- The Wooden Slipper (1934), producer
- Oliver Oliver (1934), producer
- The Distaff Side (1934), producer
- The Distant Shore (1935), producer
- Most of the Game (1935), producer
- A Room in Red and White (1936), producer
- On Your Toes (1936), producer
- Babes in Arms (1937), producer, production supervisor
- On Borrowed Time (1938), producer
- I Married an Angel (1938), producer
- Great Lady (1938), producer
- Stars in Your Eyes (1939), Producer
- Morning's at Seven (1939), producer
- Leave Her To Heaven (1940), producer
- Higher and Higher ( 1940), producer
- Old Acquaintance (1940), producer
- Letters to Lucerne (1941), producer
- Solitaire (1942), producer
- By Jupiter (1942), producer
- The Damask Cheek (1942), producer
- Street Scene (1947), producer
- A Story for Strangers (1948), producer
- The Big Knife (1949), producer
- Dance Me a Song (1950), producer
- The Country Girl (1950), producer
- Romeo and Juliet (1951), producer
