= John Cady (golfer) =

American golfer (1866–1933)

Medal record

Men's golf

Representing the United States

Olympic Games
Silver medal – second place	1904 St. Louis	Team

John Deere Cady (January 26, 1866 – November 12, 1933) was an American golfer who competed in the 1904 Summer Olympics. He was the grandson of John Deere, and the great-grandson of Linus Yale, Sr.

== Career ==
In 1904, he was part of the American team which won the silver medal. He finished 23rd in this competition. In the individual competition he finished 27th in the qualification and was eliminated in the first round of the match play.

He was a founder of the Rock Island Arsenal golf club and won the golf championship seven times. He was also an investor, businessman and socialite. His father was architect Merton Yale Cady and Cady lived at John Deere House with his parents, and later, with his wife.

He served two years as President of the Western Golf Association. He became president of the Trans-Mississippi Golf association and took part in Moline philanthropic works with the Red Cross.

He headed the Cady stone quarry in Moline, where his father had been mayor, and left for Chicago where he entered the bond and brokerage business. He became an associate of Dean, Onativia & Co., and of E. A. Pierce & Co., until his death in Chicago.

He was a member of the Onwentsia Club, Old Elm Club, Chicago Club, Rock Island clubs, and was a board governor of the Lawsonia Club.
