= Erastus Wiman =

Canadian journalist (1834–1904)

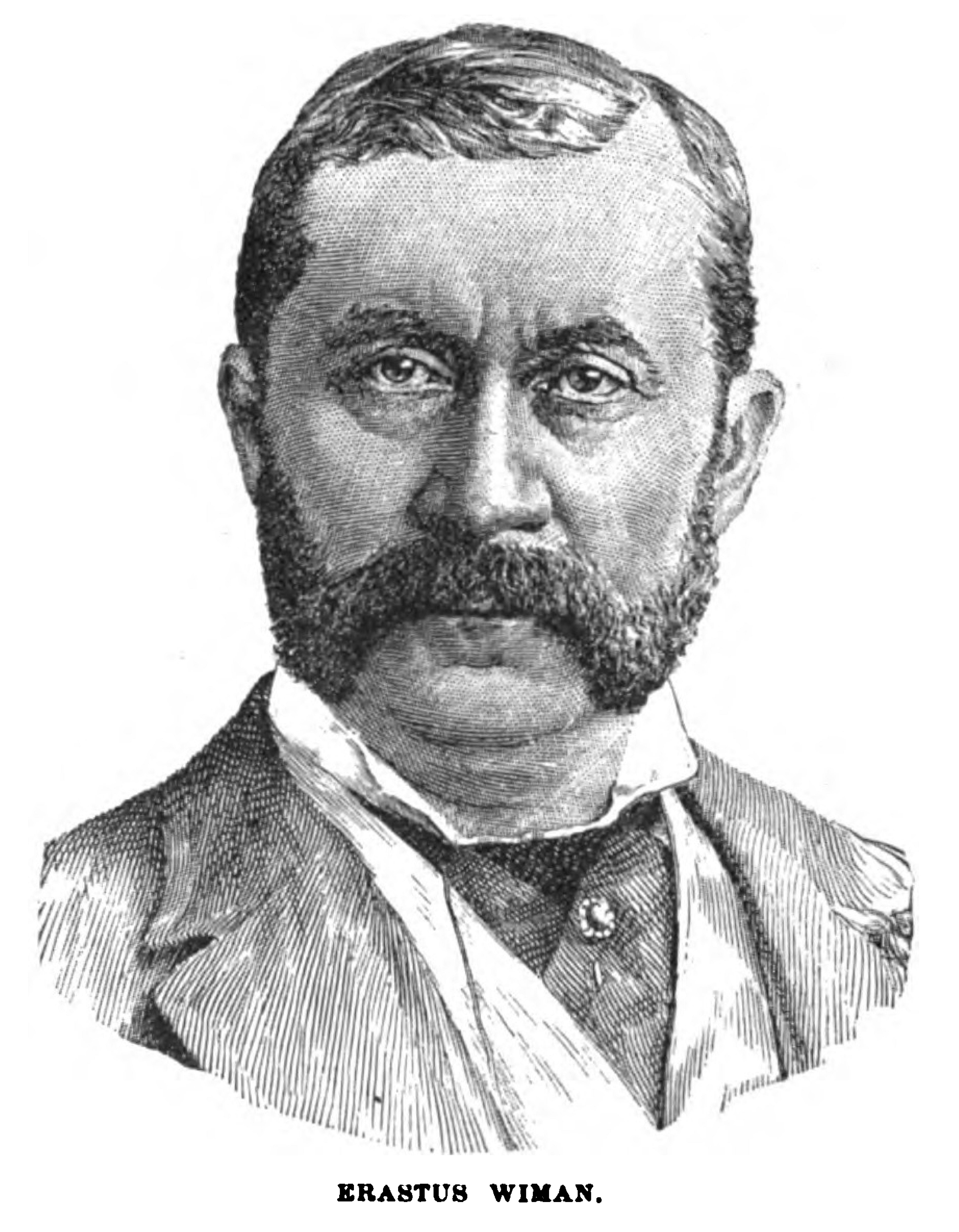
- Born: April 21, 1834; Churchville (now Brampton), Ontario, Canada
- Died: February 9, 1904 (aged 69); St. George, New York, U.S.
- Citizenship: Canadian, American
- Occupations: Reporter, Toronto Globe; President, Staten Island Telephone Exchange Co; President, Staten Island Railway Co; President, Great North Western Telegraph Company of Canada
- Organization(s): Founder, The Canadian Club of New York City
- Known for: Owner of Metropolitan Baseball Club
- Criminal charge: Forgery (1894)
- Criminal penalty: Five years and six months in state prison
- Criminal status: Conviction overturned, 1896
- Spouse: Eleanor Anne Galbraith (m. 1860)

Erastus Wiman (21 April 1834 – 9 February 1904) was a Canadian journalist and businessman who later moved to the United States. He is best known as a developer in the New York City borough of Staten Island and owner of the New York Metropolitans baseball team.

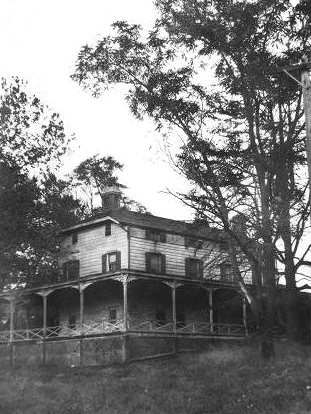
Olmsted–Beil House, 1924, property of Mr. and Mrs. Erastus Wiman

== Biography ==
Wiman was born in Churchville, Upper Canada (now part of Ontario) on April 21, 1834, the only son of Erastus Wyman and Therese Amelia née Matthews.

Wiman's first job was at the North American in Toronto (not to be confused with the Philadelphia-based paper) at age 16, as an apprentice printer for a salary of $1.50 a week for his first cousin Hon. Sir William MacDougall (whose mother Hannah was Therese's sister) and was a founding father of Canadian Confederation. After four years, he worked as a reporter and later the business editor for the Toronto Globe. He moved into business for R.G. Dun and Co., becoming the manager of the company's Ontario branch at age 26. At age 33, he was transferred to New York and would become general manager of the company (at this point known as Dun, Barlow & Co.) The firm would later be called Dun, Wiman & Co. He became president of the Great Northwestern Telegraph Company of Canada in 1881.

In the late 19th-century, Wiman emerged as a major developer in the New York City borough of Staten Island. As the president of the Staten Island Railway Co. and the St. George Ferry to Manhattan, Wiman pushed to make the borough the center of the Baltimore and Ohio Railroad's New York operations, and was also involved in one of the early proposals to connect Staten Island to the other four boroughs of the city via a rail tunnel. Wiman later constructed an amusement park near St. George Ferry Terminal, and purchased the Metropolitan Baseball Club which he relocated to the neighborhood. He owned several properties on the island, including a country home on Hylan Boulevard in Eltingville named Olmsted–Beil House, previously owned by Central Park designer Frederick Law Olmsted.

In 1893, Wiman went into bankruptcy, proceeded by the turnover of several entities he owned into the hands of others. In 1894, Wiman was arrested for forgery after attempting to cash a $5,000 check from R.G. Dunn made out to a false name. He was found guilty in 1895 (though the conviction was overturned on appeal), and would relinquish his fortune after lawsuits by his creditors. Wiman suffered a stroke in 1901, and died at his home in St. George in 1904.

== Beliefs ==
Wiman was a proponent of reciprocity, now known as free trade, between Canada and the United States.

== Personal life ==
Wiman had four sons, Henry, William who married Anna Deere-a granddaughter of John Deere, and niece of architect Merton Yale Cady. The couple were the parents of Dwight Deere Wiman (Broadway producer) as well as Charles Deere Wiman (president of Deere & Company from 1928 to 1955); Frank and Louis, and two daughters.

Grandchildren of William and Anna include Nancy "Trink" Deere Wiman, Anna Deere Wiman, Katherine Deere Wiman, Damaris Deere Wiman (last surviving grandchild), Mary Jane Wiman, and Patricia Deere Wiman, while some of the great grandchildren include Rufus Wakeman and family, Michael Colhoun and family, Susan Taft and family, Ian D Colhoun and family (daughter is Lindsay of Deere-Colhoun handbags), the Brintons and families, the Hewitts and families (includes Anna Hewitt Wolfe-owner of Mandala Healing in N.M), the Carters and families, the Glovers and families, etc.

Some of Erastus's relations on his maternal Matthews line include two well known families in the history of the fundamental Latter Day Saints religion which began abt 1838 under Joseph Smith-these were his two aunts, Maria Antoinette who married John Glines/Glynes, and Aurelia who married Thomas William Hollingshead.

Wiman became naturalized as a United States citizen in 1897.
