= Olof Olsson =

Swedish-American Lutheran clergyman

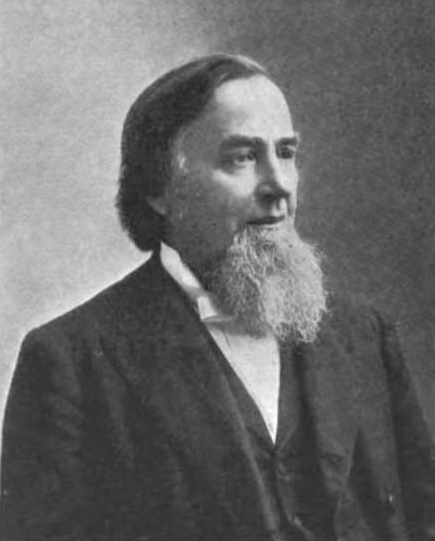

President of Augustana College
- In office 1891–1899

Personal details
- Born: 31 March 1841 Karlskoga, Värmland, Sweden
- Died: 12 May 1900 (aged 59) Rock Island, Illinois, US
- Resting place: Riverside Cemetery
- Spouse: Anna Lisa Jonsdotter (m. 1864; died 1887)
- Children: 7, including Anna Olsson
- Education: Stockholm University; Uppsala University
- Occupation: Clergyman

Olof Olsson (31 March 1841 – 12 May 1900) was a prominent Swedish-American Lutheran clergyman who served in several churches in the American Midwest. He was also the third president of Augustana College in Rock Island, Illinois, serving from 1891 to 1899.

== Biography ==
=== Sweden ===
Olof Olsson was born in Karlskoga, Värmland, Sweden. He was the son of Olof and Britta Olsson. Olsson attended the Fjellstedt School in Stockholm. He was educated at the universities of Stockholm and Uppsala, and was graduated at the latter in 1861, after spending a year (1859–1860) in the Missionary Institute at Leipzig. He also studied in the theological department of the University of Uppsala, where he graduated in 1863. He was ordained on 15 December 1863, to the ministry of the Church of Sweden and at once assumed the duties of pastor, serving in that capacity in Karlstad, Sweden, until 1868.

=== United States ===
In 1869, Olsson accepted a position as pastor in Lindsborg, Kansas. He emigrated from Sweden with his wife and daughter, his parents, his brother Carl, and 250 others. On 19 August 1869, Olsson founded the Bethany Evangelical Lutheran Church. He led the congregation from 1869 until 1876. During this time, he also served two terms in the Kansas Legislature as the representative from McPherson County. He left the Bethany Church when he was called to serve as professor of theology in the theological seminary of the Swedish Augustana College in Rock Island, Illinois. Olsson taught at Augustana from 1877 until 1888. In 1891, Olsson left a congregation at Woodhull, Illinois, to return to Augustana College as president. In 1893, he received an honorary doctorate at Uppsala University. Olsson died of stomach cancer on 12 May 1900 in Rock Island. He was buried in the family plot in Riverside Cemetery in Moline, Illinois.

== Works ==
He edited Nytt och Gammalt, a newspaper, at Lindsborg, Kansas, in 1873, and Luther-Kalender, an annual (Rock Island, Illinois, 1883). He published in Swedish At the Cross (Rock Island, Illinois), which was reprinted in Sweden; Greetings from Afar, being Recollections of Travels in England and Germany (1880; also translated into Norwegian and published in Norway); and The Christian Hope, Words of Consolation in Suffering and Sorrow (Chicago, 1887). He also helped edit Korsbaneret, the annual church year book as well as the first hymnal of the Augustana Synod published in the English language.

== Family ==
Olsson married Anna Lisa Jonsdotter on 22 December 1864. They had at least seven children, four of which lived into adulthood: Anna, Maria (Mia), Lydia, and Johannes (Hannes). Three additional children, Maria (25 December 1867 – 18 June 1868), Johannes (24 June 1872 – 27 July 1872) and Johannes Timotheus (6 April 1876 – 25 August 1876), did not survive past infancy.

=== Anna Lisa ===
Anna Lisa Jonsdotter (also known as Anna Lovisa Jonsson or Johnson) was born in Värmland, Sweden on 8 March 1841. She was the daughter of Jonas Peter Nilsson, a farmer who owned a share in a mine, and Maria Lovisa (Maja Lisa) née Ersdotter. Anna Lisa had four brothers and sisters, and five step-brothers and sisters. She died on 18 March 1887.

=== Anna ===
Anna (19 August 1866 – 15 February 1946) was the Olssons' oldest daughter, and the only Olsson child born in Sweden. She was one of the first women to attend Augustana College, and only the second woman to graduate from the college (class of 1888). Anna later taught at the college, and became known for her fiction. Anna died on 15 February 1946, at the age of 79. She was buried in the family plot in Riverside Cemetery in Moline, Illinois.

=== Maria (Mia) ===
Maria (15 September 1869 – 3 May 1934), often called Mia, was the Olssons' second daughter. She was born in Lindsborg, Kansas. During a family trip to Europe in 1889, Mia and her younger sister Lydia took lessons in "fancy work." Mia would later use these dressmaking skills to patent the "Combination Collar Fastener." This fastener was used to secure collars or belts, and predated the first patented zipper. Like her siblings, Mia attended Augustana College. She enrolled in the Conservatory of Music in 1895, studying piano. A year later, she enrolled in elocution and physical culture. Mia was also involved in several campus choral groups. Mia died on 3 May 1934, and was buried in the family plot in Riverside Cemetery in Moline, Illinois.

=== Lydia ===
Lydia (14 April 1874 – 1 March 1958), the Olssons' youngest daughter, was also born in Lindsborg. She grew up primarily in Lindsborg, Rock Island, and Woodhull. Lydia attended Augustana College between 1892 and 1895, taking courses such as phonography, typewriting, chorus, and voice. She was involved in a number of campus groups, including the Handel Oratorio Society, the chapel choir, and the Adelphic and Phrenokosmian Literary Societies.

Lydia was appointed the Augustana College library attendant in 1894, and promoted to the assistant librarian in 1895. In 1897, while registered as an art student, Lydia served as the librarian. Lydia also worked as a bookkeeper for a number of years, and as a clerk in the tractor department of the Moline Tractor Company. From 1922 until her retirement in 1945, she returned to the Augustana College Library as a library assistant. Lydia died 1 March 1958, and was buried in the family plot at Riverside Cemetery, Moline, Illinois.

=== Johannes (Hannes) ===
Johannes Samuel (4 July 1877 – 23 September 1967), often called Hannes, was the Olssons' only surviving son. He was born either in Moline, Illinois or Rock Island, Illinois. As a child, he traveled with his family in Europe. He enrolled at Augustana in 1897, and joined the Conservatory of Music in 1900. A year later, he attended the Augustana Business College. As an adult, Hannes held a number of jobs. He first was hired as a clerk for Hartz and Company, a wholesale and retail drug business. In 1929, he became a music teacher, a position he held on and off for the rest of his life. He was also a band leader and a musician. Hannes died on 23 September 1967. He was buried with the rest of his family in Riverside Cemetery, Moline, Illinois.

== Other sources ==
- Wilson, J. G.; Fiske, J., eds. (1900). "Olsson, Olof" . Appletons' Cyclopædia of American Biography. New York: D. Appleton.
- Gilman, D. C.; Peck, H. T.; Colby, F. M., eds. (1905). "Olsson, Olof" . New International Encyclopedia (1st ed.). New York: Dodd, Mead.

== Related reading ==
- Lindquist, Emory (1955) Letters of the Rev. and Mrs. Olof Olsson, 1869-1873, pioneer founders of Lindsborg (Topeka: Kansas State Historical Society)
- Lindquist, Emory (1970) Vision for a Valley, Olof Olsson and the Early History of Lindsborg (Augustana Historical Society)
- Olson, Ernst Wilhelm (1941) Olof Olsson, the man, his work, and his thoughts (Rock Island, Ill., Augustana Book Concern)
- Olson, Ernst Wilhelm (1917) The Swedish element in Illinois : survey of the past seven decades : with life sketches of men of today (Chicago: Swedish-American Biographical Association)
