= The Second Little Show =

1930 musical revue

- Sheet music cover (cropped)
- Music: Arthur Schwartz
- Lyrics: Howard Dietz
- Book: Dwight Deere Wiman
- Productions: 1930 Broadway

The Second Little Show is a musical revue with lyrics by Howard Dietz and music mostly by Arthur Schwartz.

Produced by William A. Brady, Jr. and Dwight Deere Wiman, in association with Tom Weatherly, the Broadway production opened at the Royale Theatre on September 2, 1930 and closed in October 1930, after 63 performances. Directed by Wiman and Monty Woolley and choreographed by Dave Gould, with scenic design by Jo Mielziner, the cast included Jay C. Flippen, Gloria Grafton, and Al Trahan.

This was the second in a series of Little Shows, notable for the song "Sing Something Simple" with words and music by Herman Hupfeld, introduced by Ruth Tester. Other songs include "I Like Your Face" (originally "Foolish Face"), "Lucky Seven", "What a Case I've Got On You", and "You're the Sunrise".

In staging this production, producers of the first Little Show chose a cast of unknowns, and sales suffered as a result. At the same time, the stars of the first Little Show went on to success.

== Third Little Show ==
The Third Little Show opened at the Music Box Theatre on June 1, 1931 and ran for 136 performances. The music was by various composers (including Hupfeld) and the sketches were by Noël Coward, S. J. Perelman and Marc Connelly, among others. It was directed by Alexander Leftwich and starred Beatrice Lillie, Ernest Truex, and Constance Carpenter. Lillie introduced the Coward song "Mad Dogs and Englishmen" to the American audience in this revue.
