= William Butterworth =

William Butterworth may refer to:

- William Butterworth (businessman) (1864–1936), American businessman and early Deere & Company president
- William John Butterworth (1801–1856), English colonel and Governor of the Straits Settlements
- William Walton Butterworth (1903–1975), American diplomat
- W. E. Butterworth (born 1929), American author, also known as W. E. B. Griffin
