= Benjamin Butterworth =

Politician (1837–1898)

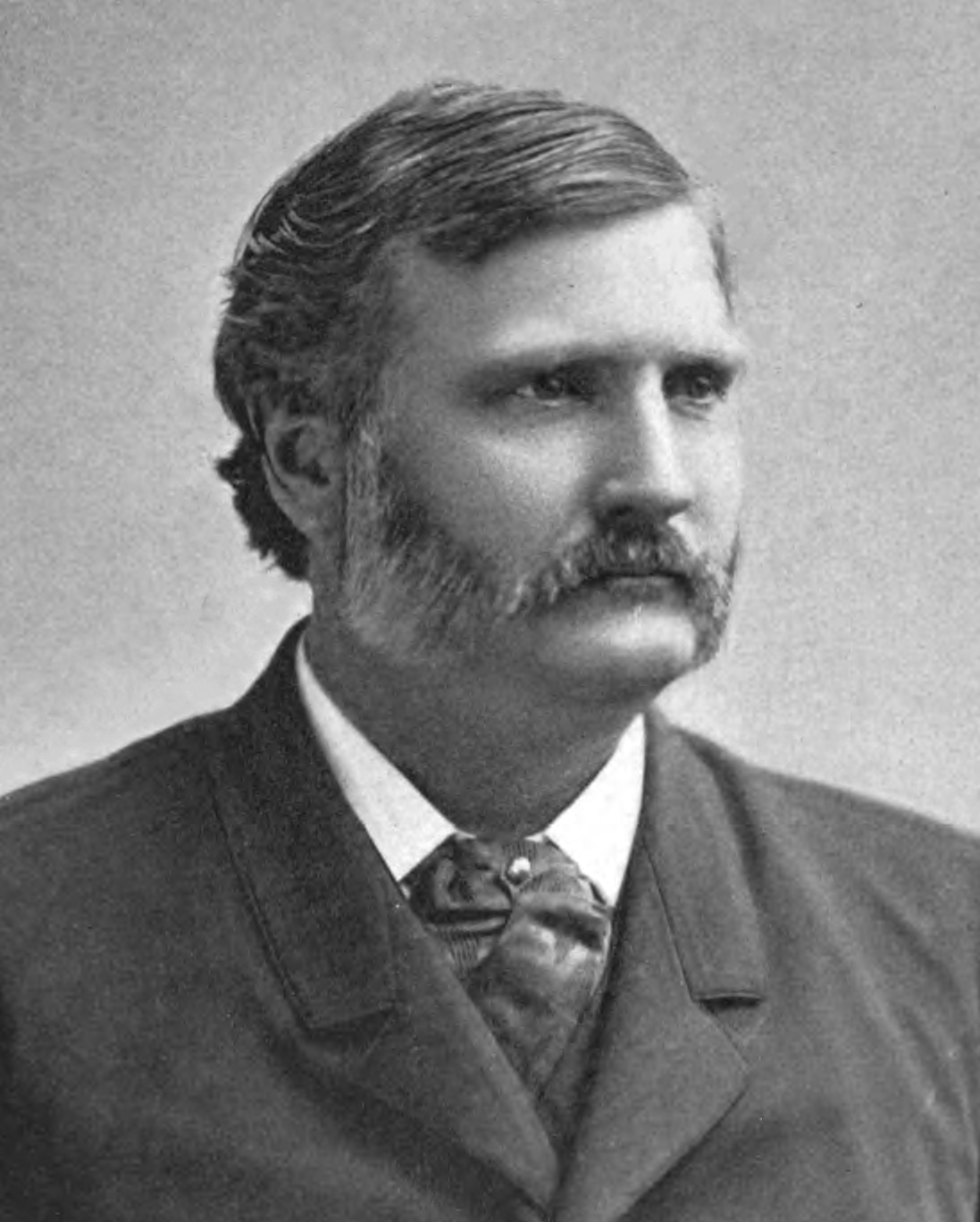

Member of the U.S. House of Representatives from Ohio's 1st district
- In office March 4, 1879 – March 3, 1883
- Preceded by: Milton Sayler
- Succeeded by: John F. Follett
- In office March 4, 1885 – March 3, 1891
- Preceded by: John F. Follett
- Succeeded by: Bellamy Storer

Member of the Ohio Senate from the second district
- In office January 5, 1874 – January 2, 1876
- Preceded by: Peter Murphy
- Succeeded by: Peter M. Dechant

Personal details
- Born: October 22, 1837 Maineville, Ohio, U.S.
- Died: January 16, 1898 (aged 60) Thomasville, Georgia, U.S.
- Resting place: Rock Creek Cemetery; Washington, D.C., U.S.
- Party: Republican
- Education: Ohio University
- Profession: Politician, Lawyer

Benjamin Butterworth (October 22, 1837 – January 16, 1898) was an American lawyer and politician. He served as a U.S. representative from Ohio and commissioner of patents.

== Biography ==
Butterworth was born near Maineville, Ohio, on October 22, 1837. Butterworth attended the common schools of Warren County, the academy in Maineville, and Ohio University in Athens, Ohio.

"His father was a Virginia planter, who, notwithstanding his property Interests, was so devoted to the cause of universal liberty that he freed his slaves and removed with his family to Ohio. In that state, he became associated with Levi Coffin in the Underground Railroad and assisted fugitive slaves until the close of the war."

Butterworth studied law, was admitted to the bar in 1861 and commenced practice in Cincinnati, Ohio. He was appointed assistant United States district attorney in 1868, and served as member of the Ohio Senate in 1874 and 1875.

Butterworth was elected as a Republican candidate to the Forty-sixth and Forty-seventh Congresses (March 4, 1879 – March 3, 1883). He was an unsuccessful candidate for reelection in 1882 to the Forty-eighth Congress. He served as delegate to the Republican National Convention in 1880 and later served as regent of the Smithsonian Institution. He was appointed a commissioner of the Northern Pacific Railroad by President Arthur in 1883. He served as special Government counsel to prosecute the South Carolina election cases in 1883. Butterworth was elected to the Forty-ninth, Fiftieth, and Fifty-first Congresses (March 4, 1885 – March 3, 1891). He served as chairman of the Committee on Patents (Fifty-first Congress). He was not a candidate for renomination in 1890.

Butterworth shared the racist views held by some but not all congressmen of his era, calling the Chinese "a lower race of people" and declaring that allowing them to mix with whites would create at best "degrading amalgamation but no elevating and ennobling assimilation."

He was appointed secretary of the 1893 World's Fair Columbian Exposition project at Chicago during the early 1890s and was widely recognized for his role in the success of that enterprise.

Following his government service he resumed the practice of his profession in Washington, D.C. In 1896 he was appointed Commissioner of Patents and served in that capacity until his death.

Butterworth was regarded as "one of Ohio's big four politically". The quartet was William McKinley, Joseph Benson Foraker, Charlie Foster and Butterworth. He died January 16, 1898, from a severe attack of pneumonia, at Thomasville, Georgia, where he had gone for his health.

He was interred in Rock Creek Cemetery, Washington, D.C. His son, William Butterworth, married the granddaughter of inventor John Deere, and niece of architect Merton Yale Cady.

U.S. House of Representatives
Preceded by Milton Sayler	Member of the U.S. House of Representatives from Ohio's 1st congressional district 1879–1883	Succeeded by John F. Follett
Preceded by John F. Follett	Member of the U.S. House of Representatives from Ohio's 1st congressional district 1885–1891	Succeeded by Bellamy Storer
