= Anna Olsson =

Anna Olsson may refer to:

- Anna Olsson (canoeist) (born 1964), Swedish sprint canoeist
- Anna Olsson (cross-country skier) (born 1976), Swedish cross-country skier
- Anna Olsson (author) (1866–1946), Swedish-American author
- Anna-Karin Olsson (born 1967), Swedish tennis and bandy player
