= Keep Off the Grass =

Musical revue

Keep Off The Grass
- Sheet music cover (cropped)
- Music: Jimmy McHugh
- Lyrics: Al Dubin and Howard Dietz
- Book: Mort Lewis, Parke Levy, Alan Lipscott, S. Jay Kaufman, and Panama & Frank
- Productions: 1940 Broadway

Keep Off the Grass is a musical revue with sketches by Mort Lewis, Parke Levy, Alan Lipscott, S. Jay Kaufman, and Panama & Frank, lyrics by Al Dubin and Howard Dietz, and music by Jimmy McHugh. The choreography was by George Balanchine.

Produced by Lee Shubert and J. J. Shubert, the Broadway production, opened on May 23, 1940, at the Broadhurst Theatre and ran for a total of 44 performances. The cast included Jimmy Durante, Ray Bolger, Jane Froman, Virginia O'Brien, Emmett Kelly, Jackie Gleason and Ilka Chase. O'Brien recorded four of the songs for Columbia Records in 1940 and they are included as bonus tracks on her CD "Virginia O'Brien Salutes the Great MGM Musicals".

Despite the star power of Durante and Bolger, Keep Off the Grass did not receive good notices. The only positive review came from the Time critic who wrote: "...and there's a bum, Emmett Kelly, who would leisurely proceed to eat a ham sandwich out of a paper poke while a bunch of other bums sang a park bench song; then he would lazily brush his teeth with the dry stub of a toothbrush, which provides the one moment of an otherwise uninspired show."

== Songs ==
- The Cabby's Serenade
- This Is Spring
- Crazy as a Loon
- A Fugitive from Esquire (lyrics by Howard Dietz)
- I'll Applaud (You) With My Feet
- Two in a Taxi (lyrics by Howard Dietz)
- Rhett, Scarlett & Ashley (lyrics by Howard Dietz)
- A Latin Tune, a Manhattan Moon, and You
- Clear Out of This World
- Look Out for My Heart
- (I'm an) Old Jitterbug
- I'm in the Mood
- Raffles (music by Vernon Duke)
- On the Old Park Bench (lyrics by Howard Dietz)
- This is Winter

== Other uses ==
"Keep off the Grass" was an unreleased song by Big Audio Dynamite in the 1980s. "Keep off the Grass" was a ragtime piece played by James P. Johnson in the 1920s.
