= Merton Yale Cady =

American architect (1840–1900)

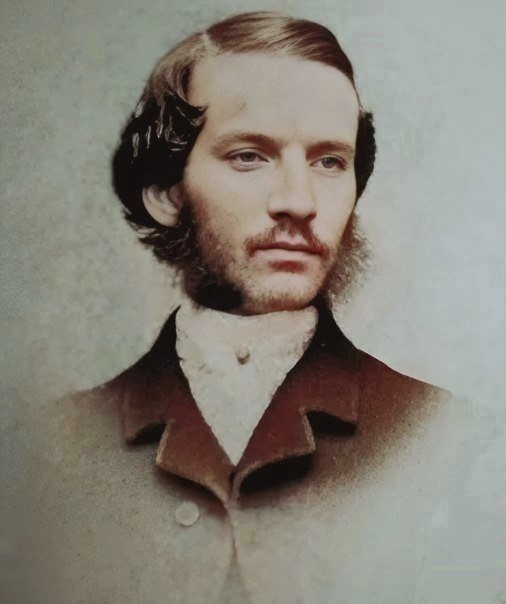
Merton Yale Cady, architect in Moline, Illinois

Merton Yale Cady (1840 – 1900) was an American prominent architect and builder in Moline, Illinois. He designed various buildings at Chicago World's Fair in 1893, and designed the Riverside Cemetery in Moline. He designed Cast-iron structures and number of buildings for his father-in-law, John Deere, and his enterprise, Deere & Company.

He also worked in New York for the Yale Lock Company of his grandfather, Linus Yale Sr., and on the Equitable Life Building in Manhattan.

== Early life ==
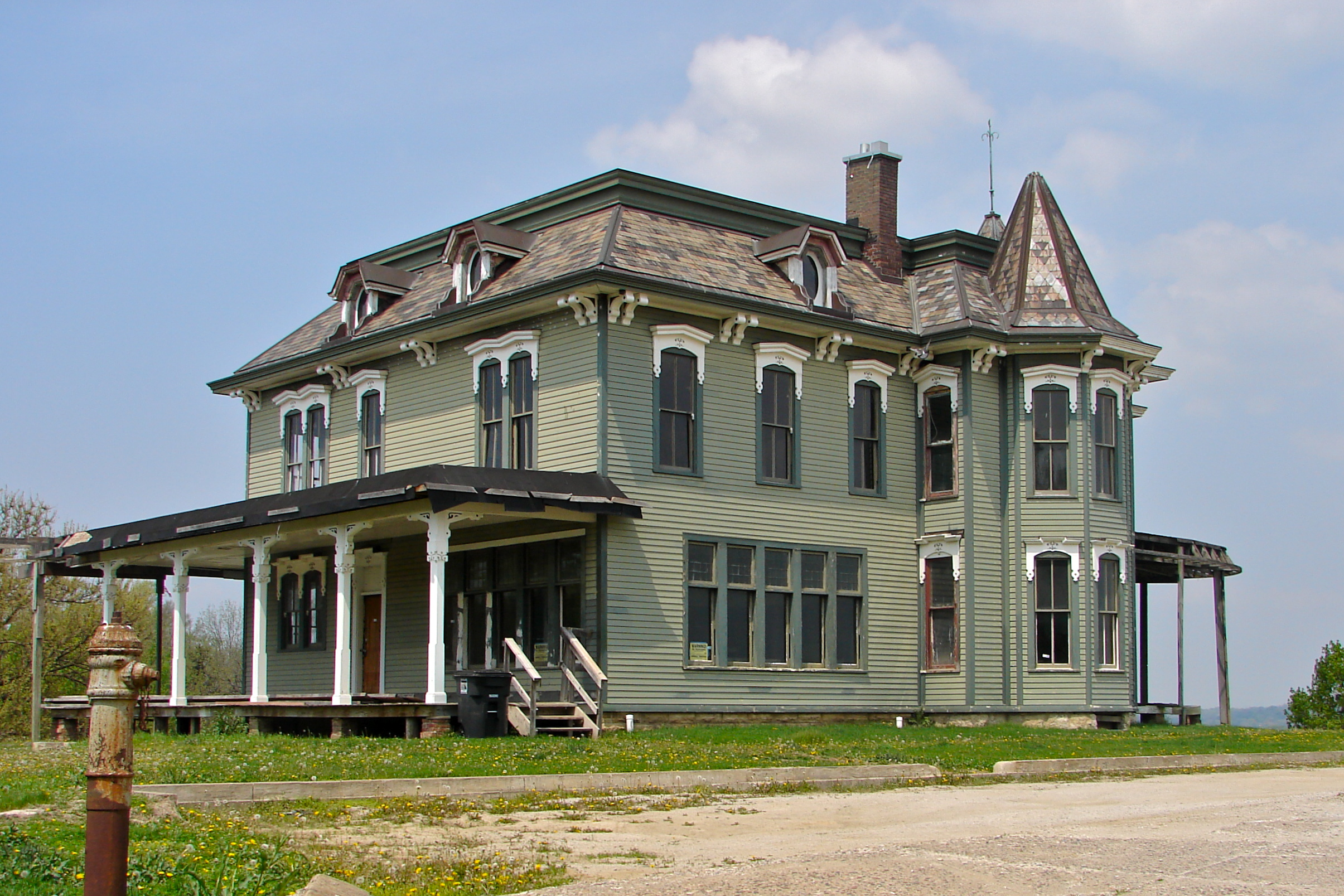
Redcliff Manor, past residence of John Deere, was inherited by Merton Yale Cady's wife

Merton Yale Cady was born in Newport, New York, on May 20, 1840, to Ira L. Cady and Chlotilda Yale, members of the Yale family. His father was a burglar proof and bank-lock expert, and had patents on bank vaults. He lived at the Yale-Cady Octagon House, built by Merton Yale Cady's grandfather, Linus Yale Sr. His uncle was Linus Yale Jr., founder of the Yale Lock Company.

Cady passed his childhood in Newport, where his grandfather had been a mayor, and was educated at the Cooper Institute, in Cooperstown, New York. He then moved to New York City, where he learned Cast-iron architecture. He learned the trade for five years and then became a bank-lock expert, working at the Yale Lock Company until the Great Chicago Fire of 1871.

He worked under his father and became superintendent of the burglar systems on many buildings, including the New York Equitable Building, and erected iron fronts on other structures in the city.

== Biography ==
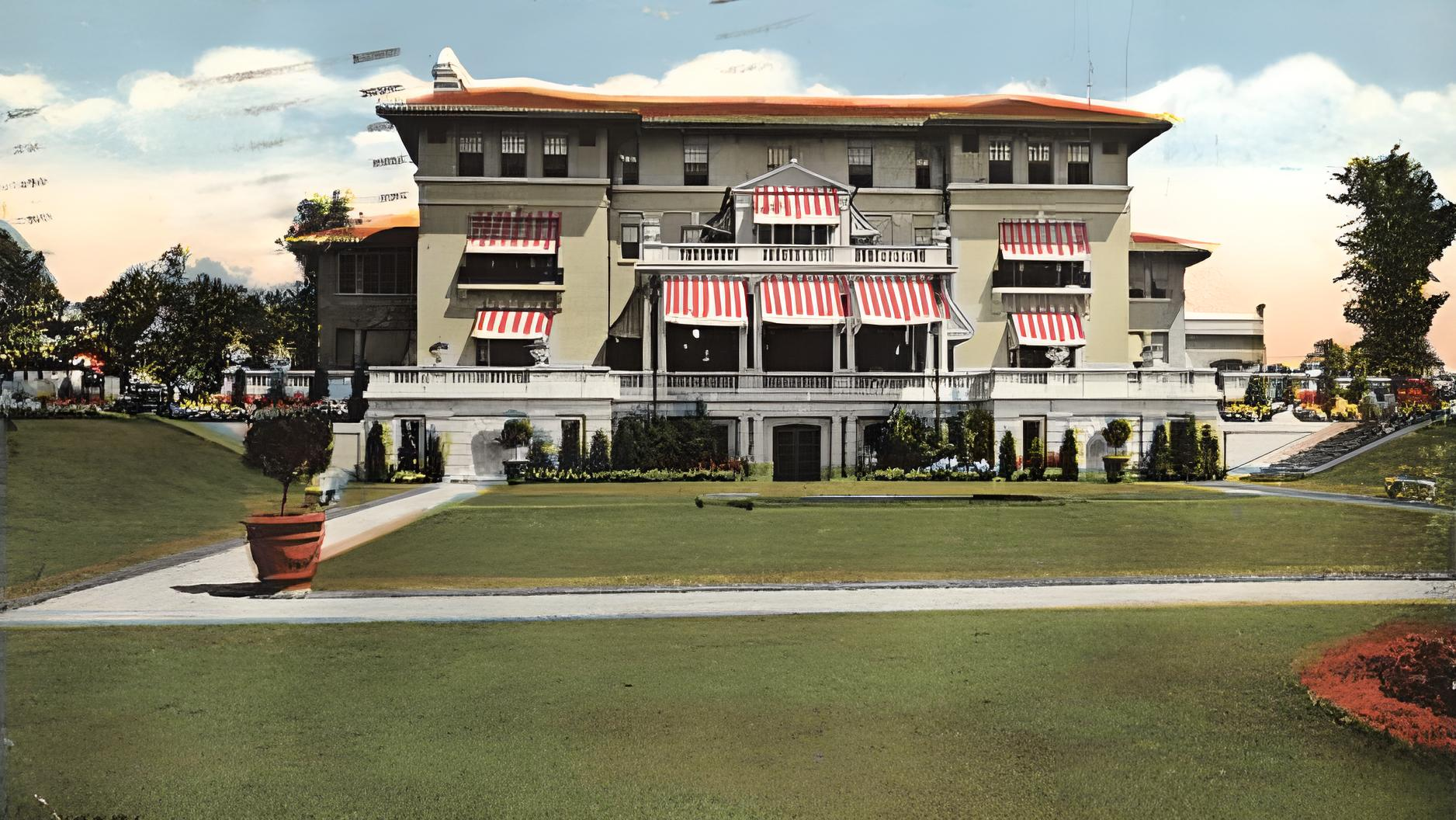
Villa Velie in Moline, Illinois, built in 1921 by his nephew, Willard Lamb Velie, grandson of John Deere

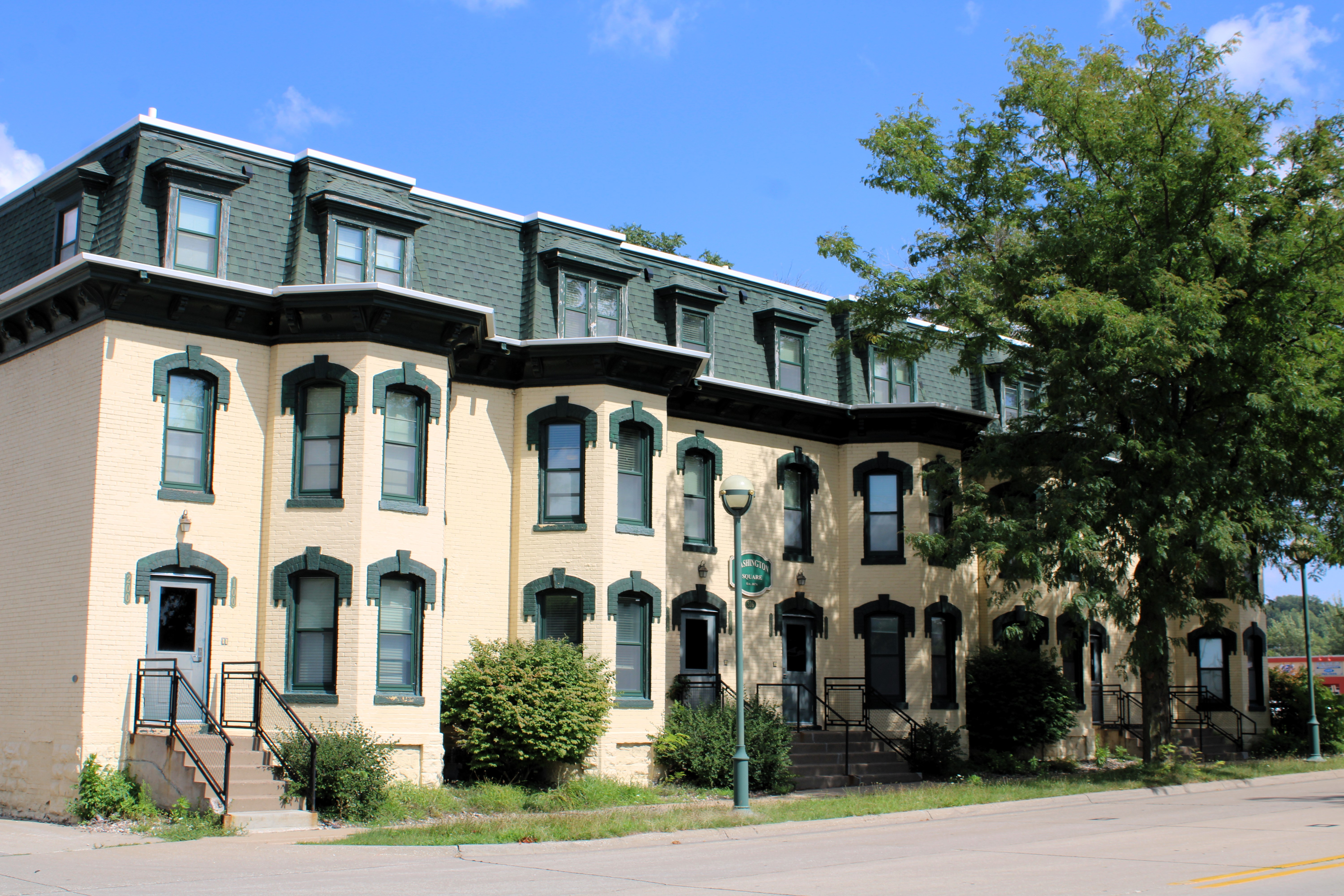
Deere Row apartment building, designed by Cady in 1872, converted into Washington Square project in Moline

In 1865, Cady married to Alice Deere, daughter of John Deere. His nephew, Willard Lamb Velie, was a wealthy airplane and automobile manufacturer. His nieces married to William Butterworth, son of Congressman Benjamin Butterworth and president of Deere & Company, and to William Wiman, son of whiskey producer Erastus Wiman, owner of Canadian Club and the New York Metropolitans.

Cady moved to Chicago trying to expand the burglar-proof business. He stayed there a few years and thereafter moved to Moline, Illinois, in 1877, and started his trade as an architect and interior decorator. Cady would become a prominent architect and builder in Moline, Illinois. He became proprietor of John Deere's 250 acres blooded-stock farm known as Alderney Hill Farm.

He was the architect and superintendent of the Riverside Cemetery in Moline. He designed plans for a chapel of the Congregational Church in the city, and the S. S. David & Company building next to the Chicago, Burlington and Quincy Railroad Depot. After the death of John Deere, his wife inherited Redcliff Manor and the family started living there in 1887. It would be inherited thereafter by their daughter, Mabel Cady, wife of Charles Porter Skinner, three times Mayor of Moline, Illinois.

In 1893, Cady was one of the architects who designed the buildings of Chicago World's Fair, and was one of its managers. He was one of the judges of the Manufacturers Department of the fair, had office in the Pacific Building, and was involved on the Award Committee with Governor George White Baxter and Senator John Boyd Thacher.

== Later life ==
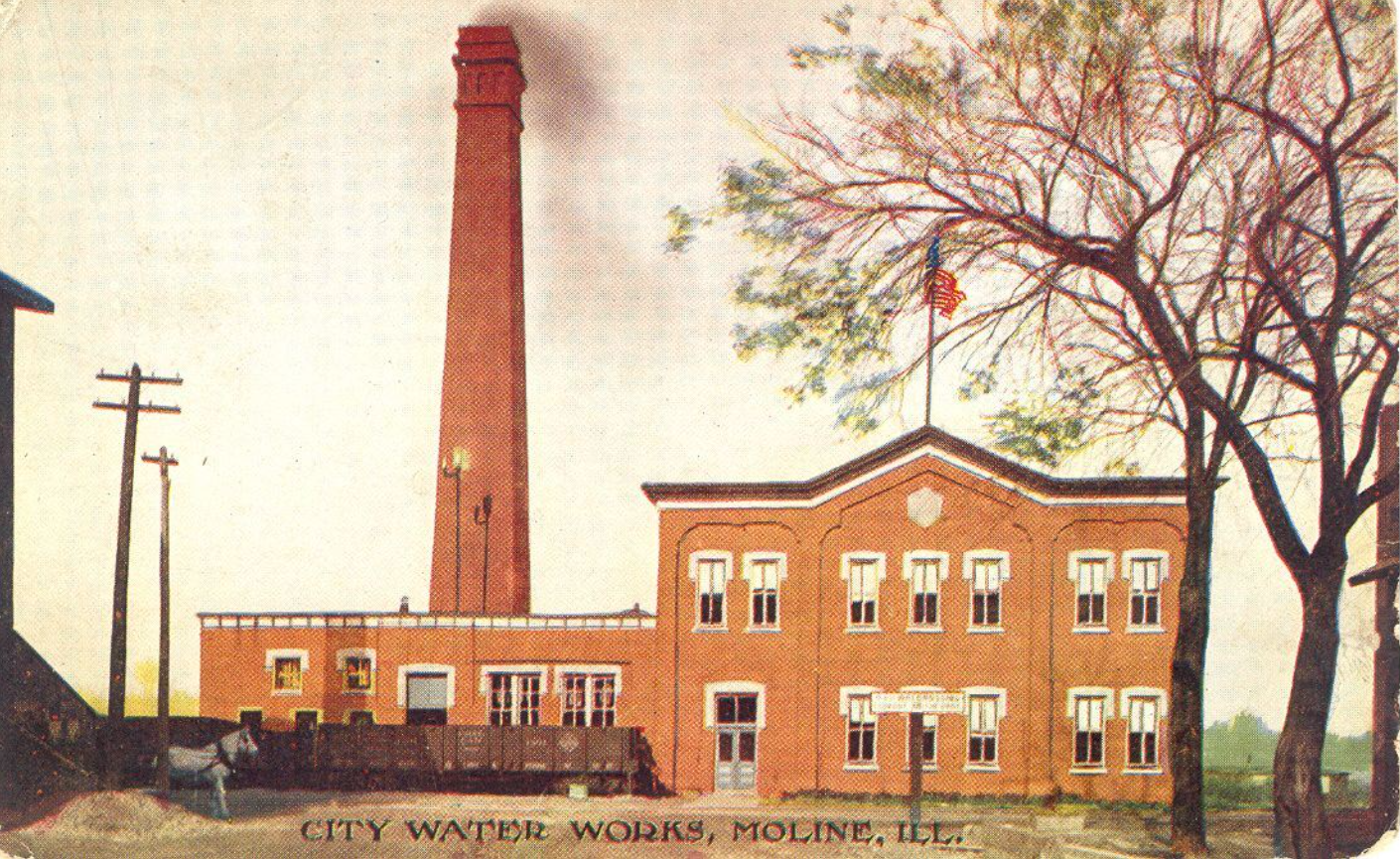
Moline City Water Works, Illinois, designed by architect Merton Yale Cady

He worked as a purchasing agent for his brother-in-law, Charles Henry Deere, and designed Deere's Block office and commercial buildings, as well as Deere Row apartment building. Some of his buildings are still standing in the city. The luxurious apartments were built for the company's executives in 1872, and would be preserved in 2007 as part of the American Recovery and Reinvestment Act.

It was renamed Washington Square and they received a State award from Landmarks Preservation Council of Illinois for the restoration project. He worked on various post offices and became among the most prominent citizens and largest employers of Moline, beside the leading manufacturers.

He was the architect who designed Moline City Water Works, and the three-story Skinner building of banker Porter Skinner. He also designed number of iron structural works. Cady was a horse racing lover and had his own private race track on his estate at Cady's farm in Moline. He was an artist during his spare time and a Republican in politics.

Cady died on March 4, 1900, in Chicago, at 59 years old. His children were golfer John Deere Cady and Mabel Cady Skinner, mother-in-law of baseball executive Warren Giles, and grandmother of William Yale Giles, co-owner of the Philadelphia Phillies. The Cady memorial, a window built and named in honor of Merton Yale Cady, was installed on Moline's First Congregational Church in 1901, next to those of his relatives, John Deere and Stephen Henry Velie.
