= John F. Follett =

American politician (1831–1902)

John Fassett Follett
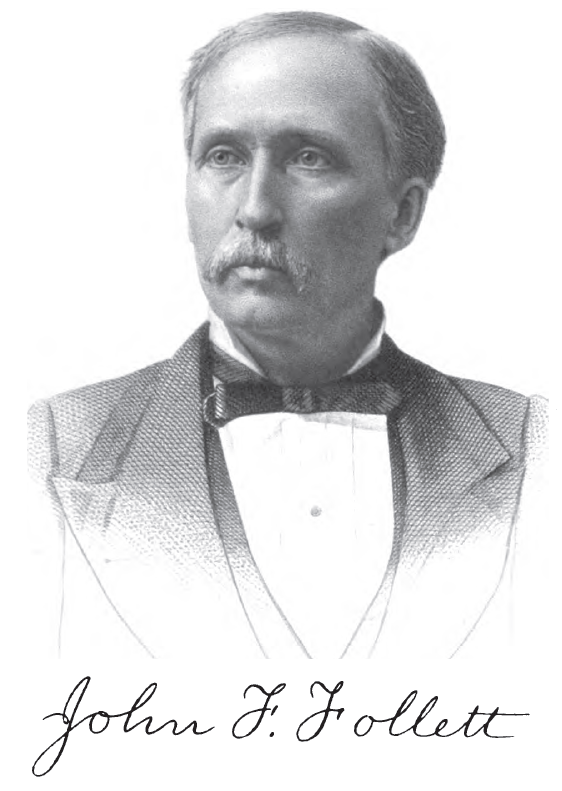

Member of the U.S. House of Representatives from Ohio's 1st district
- In office March 4, 1883 – March 3, 1885
- Preceded by: Benjamin Butterworth
- Succeeded by: Benjamin Butterworth

Member of the Ohio House of Representatives from the Licking County district
- In office 1866–1868 Serving with John H. Putnam, William Parr
- Preceded by: John H. Putnam
- Succeeded by: William Parr, Morgan N. O'Dell

Personal details
- Born: February 18, 1831 Enosburg, Vermont
- Died: April 15, 1902 (aged 71) Cincinnati, Ohio
- Resting place: Spring Grove Cemetery
- Party: Democratic
- Education: Marietta College

John Fassett Follett (February 18, 1831 – April 15, 1902) was a U.S. representative from Ohio for one term from 1883 to 1885.

== Early life and career ==
Born near Enosburg, Vermont, Follett moved to Ohio in 1837 with his parents, who settled in Licking County. He pursued classical studies, and was graduated from Marietta College in 1855. He taught school two years.

He studied law and was admitted to the bar in 1858 and practiced. He served as member of the State house of representatives 1866–1868. He served as speaker in 1868. He moved to Cincinnati in 1868 and engaged in the practice of law.

== Congress ==
Follett was elected as a Democrat to the Forty-eighth Congress (March 4, 1883 – March 3, 1885). He was an unsuccessful candidate for reelection in 1884 to the Forty-ninth Congress.

== Later career and death ==
He resumed the practice of law. He was an unsuccessful candidate for election in 1898 to the Fifty-sixth Congress.

=== Death ===
He died in Cincinnati, Ohio, April 15, 1902. He was interred in Spring Grove Cemetery.

== Sources ==
- United States Congress. "John F. Follett (id: F000243)". Biographical Directory of the United States Congress.

U.S. House of Representatives
Preceded by Benjamin Butterworth	Member of the U.S. House of Representatives from Ohio's 1st congressional district 1883-1885	Succeeded by Benjamin Butterworth
