= Maineville, Ohio =

- Village
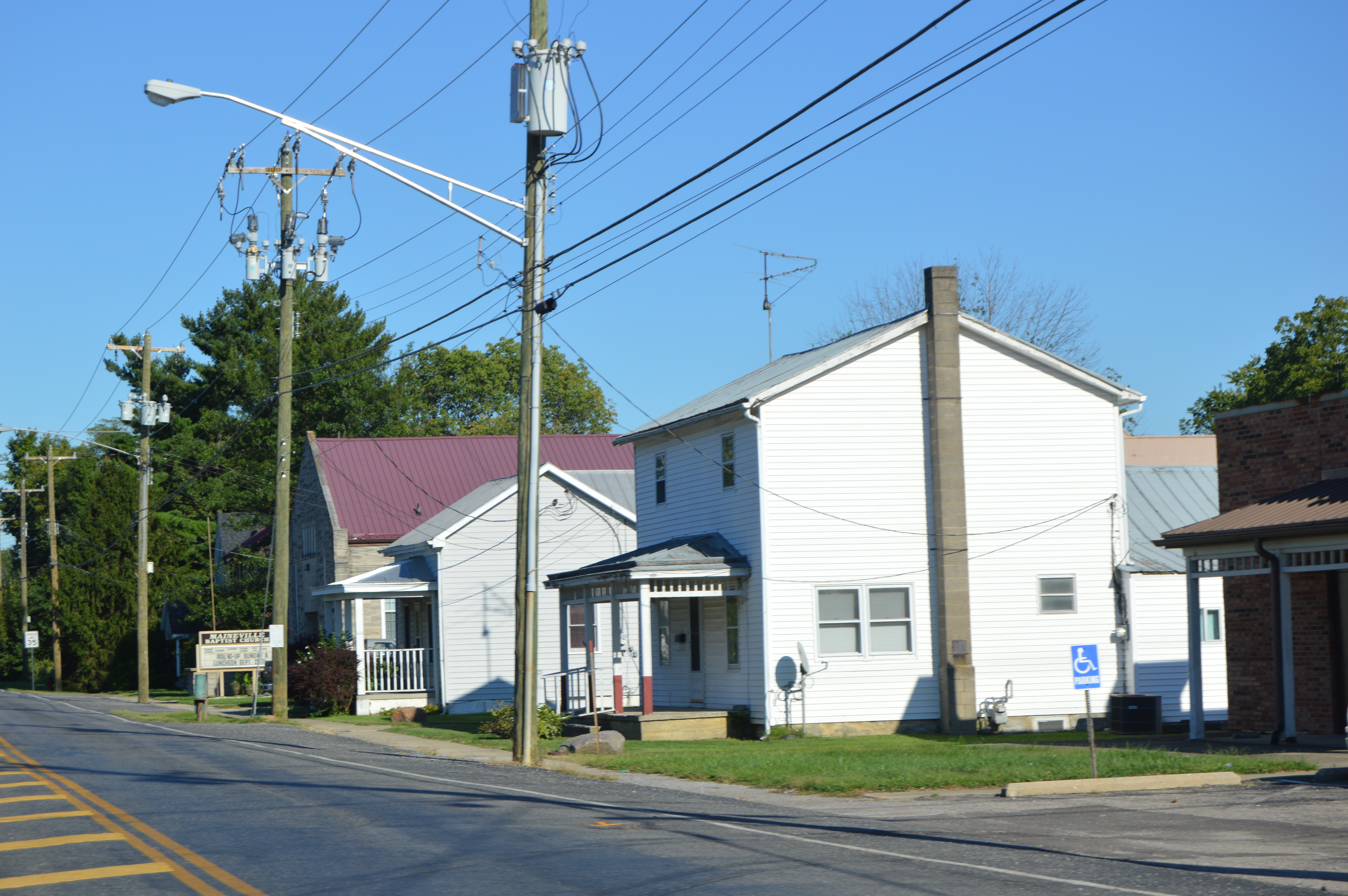
- Houses on Maineville Road

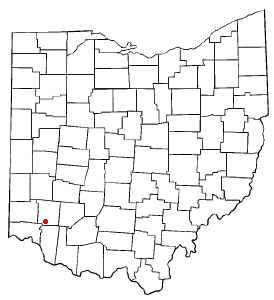
- Location of Maineville, Ohio

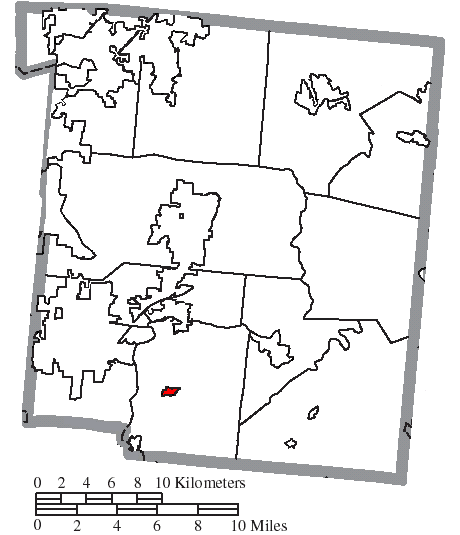
- Location of Maineville in Warren County
- Coordinates: 39°18′24″N 84°11′59″W
- Country: United States
- State: Ohio
- County: Warren

Government
  - Type: Statutory government
  - Mayor: Bob Beebe

Area
  - Total: 1.59 sq mi (4.11 km^{2})
  - Land: 1.59 sq mi (4.11 km^{2})
  - Water: 0 sq mi (0.00 km^{2})
- Elevation: 797 ft (243 m)

Population (2020)
  - Total: 1,405
  - Density: 884.5/sq mi (341.51/km^{2})
- Time zone: UTC-5 (Eastern (EST))
  - Summer (DST): UTC-4 (EDT)
- ZIP code: 45039
- Area code: 513
- FIPS code: 39-46872
- GNIS feature ID: 2399227
- Website: http://www.mainevilleoh.com

Maineville is a village in Warren County, Ohio, United States. The population was 1,468 as of 2020.

== History ==
Maineville was incorporated as a village on March 23, 1850. The village derives its name from Maine, the native state of a large share of its first settlers.The settlers came mostly from the Maine town of Phillips; and some from nearby Farmington. Originally, the relocation of these people involved nearly one hundred families (the relocation took 30 to 60 days). The town was called "Yankeetown" and "Maineville", and in 1850 it was incorporated as "Maineville". A village flag was designed and created by John Michael, later to become Mayor of Maineville. The flag includes Ohio and Maine, the state seals and a connecting reference to the two areas. The flag was adopted unanimously by the Maineville Council in 1994. A post office was established at Maineville in 1854.

== Geography ==
According to the United States Census Bureau, the village has a total area of 1.37 square miles (3.55 km^{2}), all land.

== Demographics ==
Historical population
Census	Pop.	Note	%±
1870	290		—
1880	324		11.7%
1890	256		−21.0%
1900	288		12.5%
1910	245		−14.9%
1920	269		9.8%
1930	304		13.0%
1940	278		−8.6%
1950	312		12.2%
1960	343		9.9%
1970	333		−2.9%
1980	307		−7.8%
1990	359		16.9%
2000	885		146.5%
2010	975		10.2%
2020	1,405		44.1%
U.S. Decennial Census

=== 2010 census ===
As of the census of 2010, there were 995 people, 401 households, and 266 families living in the village. The population density was 711.7 inhabitants per square mile (274.8/km^{2}). There were 422 housing units at an average density of 308.0 per square mile (118.9/km^{2}). The racial makeup of the village was 97.6% White, 0.5% African American, 0.1% Native American, 0.4% Asian, 0.2% from other races, and 1.1% from two or more races. Hispanic or Latino of any race were 0.8% of the population.

There were 401 households, of which 31.9% had children under the age of 18 living with them, 51.1% were married couples living together, 8.5% had a female householder with no male partner present, 6.7% had a male householder with no female partner present, and 33.7% were non-families. 30.7% of all households were made up of individuals, and 13.5% had someone living alone who was 65 years of age or older. The average household size was 2.43 and the average family size was 3.04.

The median age in the village was 38.4 years. 24.9% of residents were under the age of 18; 5.5% were between the ages of 18 and 24; 28% were from 25 to 44; 28.6% were from 45 to 64; and 13.1% were 65 years of age or older. The gender makeup of the village was 50.5% male and 49.5% female.

=== 2000 census ===
As of the census of 2000, there were 359 people, 164 households, and 158 families living in the village. The population density was 3,637.1 inhabitants per square mile (1,404.3/km^{2}). There were 390 housing units at an average density of 1,602.8 per square mile (618.8/km^{2}). The racial makeup of the village was 98.64% White, 0.23% African American, 0.11% Asian, 0.34% from other races, and 0.68% from two or more races. Hispanic or Latino of any race were 0.90% of the population.

There were 164 households, out of which 30.8% had children under the age of 18 living with them, 60.2% were married couples living together, 7.1% had a female householder with no husband present, and 29.1% were non-families. 26.1% of all households were made up of individuals, and 17.3% had someone living alone who was 65 years of age or older. The average household size was 2.43 and the average family size was 2.94.

In the village, the population was spread out, with 22.3% under the age of 18, 6.7% from 18 to 24, 34.9% from 25 to 44, 21.5% from 45 to 64, and 14.7% who were 65 years of age or older. The median age was 38 years. For every 100 females there were 88.3 males. For every 100 females age 18 and over, there were 80.1 males.

The median income for a household in the village was $55,714, and the median income for a family was $65,089. Males had a median income of $43,828 versus $28,636 for females. The per capita income for the village was $24,054. About 2.0% of families and 3.2% of the population were below the poverty line, including 1.0% of those under age 18 and 6.8% of those age 65 or over.

== Notable people ==
- Benjamin Butterworth – lawyer and politician
- William Butterworth – president and chair of Deere & Company
