= Howard Dietz =

American songwriter (1896–1983)

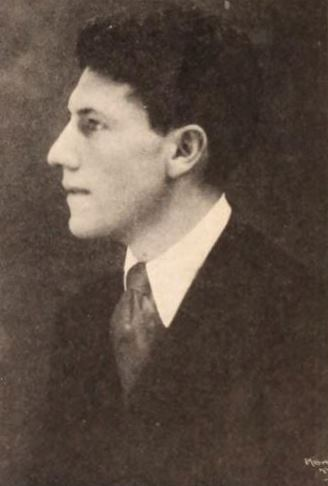
- Dietz, c. 1920

Background information
- Born: September 8, 1896; New York City, U.S.
- Died: July 30, 1983 (aged 86) New York City, U.S.
- Occupations: Publicist, lyricist, and librettist

Howard Dietz (September 8, 1896 – July 30, 1983) was an American publicist, lyricist, and librettist, best remembered for his songwriting collaboration with Arthur Schwartz. According to historian Stanley Green, Dietz and Schwartz were "most closely identified with the revue form of musical theatre."

== Biography ==
Dietz was born in New York City. He attended Columbia College and then studied journalism at Columbia University. He also served as publicist/director of advertising for Goldwyn Pictures and later MGM and is often credited with creating Leo the Lion, its lion mascot, and choosing their slogan Ars Gratia Artis. In 1942, he was made MGM's Vice President in Charge of Publicity. He held that position until his retirement in 1957. He wrote "special lyrics" for MGM's compilation film That's Entertainment, Part II in 1976.

He began a long association with composer Arthur Schwartz, when they teamed up for the Broadway revue The Little Show in 1929. They would continue to work on and off over the next 30 or so years. Dietz served in the US Navy in World War I and became editor of their magazine, Navy Life. During World War II, he assisted the U.S. Treasury Department with the publicity and promotion of War Bonds, and created stage shows for the Coast Guard with composer Vernon Duke.

Dietz saved copies of every document relating to his career, as well as relating to the publicity campaigns of every MGM film he publicized. After his death, this vast trove of artifacts was donated to the New York Public Library for the Performing Arts. The archive on Dietz constitutes its single largest archive on any person or subject.

In 1972, Howard Dietz was inducted into the Songwriters Hall of Fame. And, in 1981, he was inducted into the American Theatre Hall of Fame.

== Personal life ==
Dietz was married three times. He married Elizabeth Bigelow Hall in 1917. They divorced in 1936. In 1930, the couple had bought a townhouse on 18 West 11th Street in Greenwich Village from stockbroker Charles E. Merrill, founder of Merrill Lynch. The townhouse was later bought by advertising executive James Platt Wilkerson, whose daughter Cathlyn Platt Wilkerson was a member of the far-left terrorist organization Weather Underground; Wilkerson's associates were assembling a bomb in the basement in 1970 when it exploded and destroyed the townhouse.

Dietz married Tanis Guinness Montagu on January 25, 1937, and had a daughter; they divorced 14 years later, in 1951. Later that year, he married the costume designer Lucinda Ballard. He died in July 1983, in New York City of Parkinson's disease, from which he had suffered from 1954.

== Broadway credits ==
- Dear Sir — 1924 (music by Jerome Kern)
- Merry-Go-Round — 1927 (music by Henry Souvaine and Jay Gorney)
- The Little Show — 1929 (music by Schwartz)
- The Second Little Show — 1930 (music by Schwartz)
- Three's a Crowd — 1930 (music by Schwartz)
- The Band Wagon — 1931 (music by Schwartz)
- Flying Colors — 1932 (music by Schwartz)
- Revenge with Music — 1934 (music by Schwartz)
- At Home Abroad — 1935 (music by Schwartz)
- Between the Devil — 1937 (music by Schwartz)
- Keep Off the Grass — 1940 (Dietz contributed three songs with music by Jimmy McHugh)
- Jackpot — 1944 (music by Vernon Duke)
- Sadie Thompson — 1944 (music by Duke)
- Inside U.S.A. — 1948 (music by Schwartz)
- The Gay Life — 1961 (music by Schwartz)
- Jennie — 1963 (music by Schwartz)
- That's Entertainment — 1972 (music by Schwartz)

== London credits ==
- Here Comes the Bride — 1930 (music by Schwartz)

== Radio credit ==
- The MGM Theater of the Air, host (1949–1951)

== Songs ==
- "All The King's Horses" (w.m. Alec Wilder, Edward Brandt & Howard Dietz). Introduced in the revue Three's A Crowd by Margaret Lee.
- "Alone Together" (music by Schwartz). Introduced in the revue Flying Colors by Jean Sargent.
- "Blue Grass" (music by Schwartz). From the musical Inside U.S.A.
- "By Myself" (music by Schwartz). Introduced by Jack Buchanan in the musical Between the Devil
- "Dancing In The Dark" (music by Schwartz). Introduced by John Barker in the 1931 revue The Band Wagon.
- "The Dickey-Bird Song" (music by Sammy Fain). Introduced in the 1948 film Three Daring Daughters by Jeanette MacDonald, Jane Powell, Jean Garbo dubbing for Elinor Donahue and Pat Hyatt dubbing for Ann E. Todd.
- "First Prize at the Fair" (music by Schwartz). From the musical Inside U.S.A..
- "A Fugitive from Esquire" (music by Jimmy McHugh). Introduced by Jimmy Durante in the musical Keep Off The Grass
- "Get Yourself a Geisha" (music by Schwartz). From the musical revue At Home Abroad
- "Got A Bran' New Suit" (music by Schwartz). Introduced by Ethel Waters in the 1935 revue At Home Abroad
- "Haunted Heart" (music by Schwartz). Introduced by John Tyers in the revue Inside U.S.A.
- "Hoops" (music by Schwartz). Introduced in the 1931 revue The Band Wagon by Fred and Adele Astaire
- "I Guess I'll Have to Change My Plan" (music by Schwartz). Introduced by Clifton Webb in the 1929 revue The Little Show.
- "I Love Louisa" (music by Schwartz). Introduced by Fred and Adele Astaire in the 1931 revue The Band Wagon
- "I See Your Face Before Me" (music by Schwartz). Introduced by Jack Buchanan, Evelyn Laye and Adele Dixon in the 1937 musical Between the Devil
- "Louisiana Hayride" (music by Schwartz). Introduced by Tamara Geva, Clifton Webb and ensemble in the 1932 revue Flying Colors
- "The Love I Long For" (music Vernon Duke). Introduced by June Havoc and James Newill in the musical Sadie Thompson
- "Love Is a Dancing Thing" (music by Schwartz) from the 1935 revue At Home Abroad
- "Moanin' Low" (music by Ralph Rainger). Introduced by Libby Holman in the revue The Little Show
- "Rhode Island Is Famous For You" (music Schwartz) from the revue Inside U.S.A.
- "That's Entertainment!" (music by Schwartz). Introduced by Jack Buchanan, Nanette Fabray, Oscar Levant and Fred Astaire in the 1953 film The Band Wagon
- "You and the Night and the Music" (music by Schwartz) from the musical Revenge with Music.
- "If There Is Someone Lovelier Than You" (music by Schwartz) from the musical Revenge with Music.
- "Schickelgruber" (music by Kurt Weill)
