= Anna Olsson (author) =

Swedish-American author

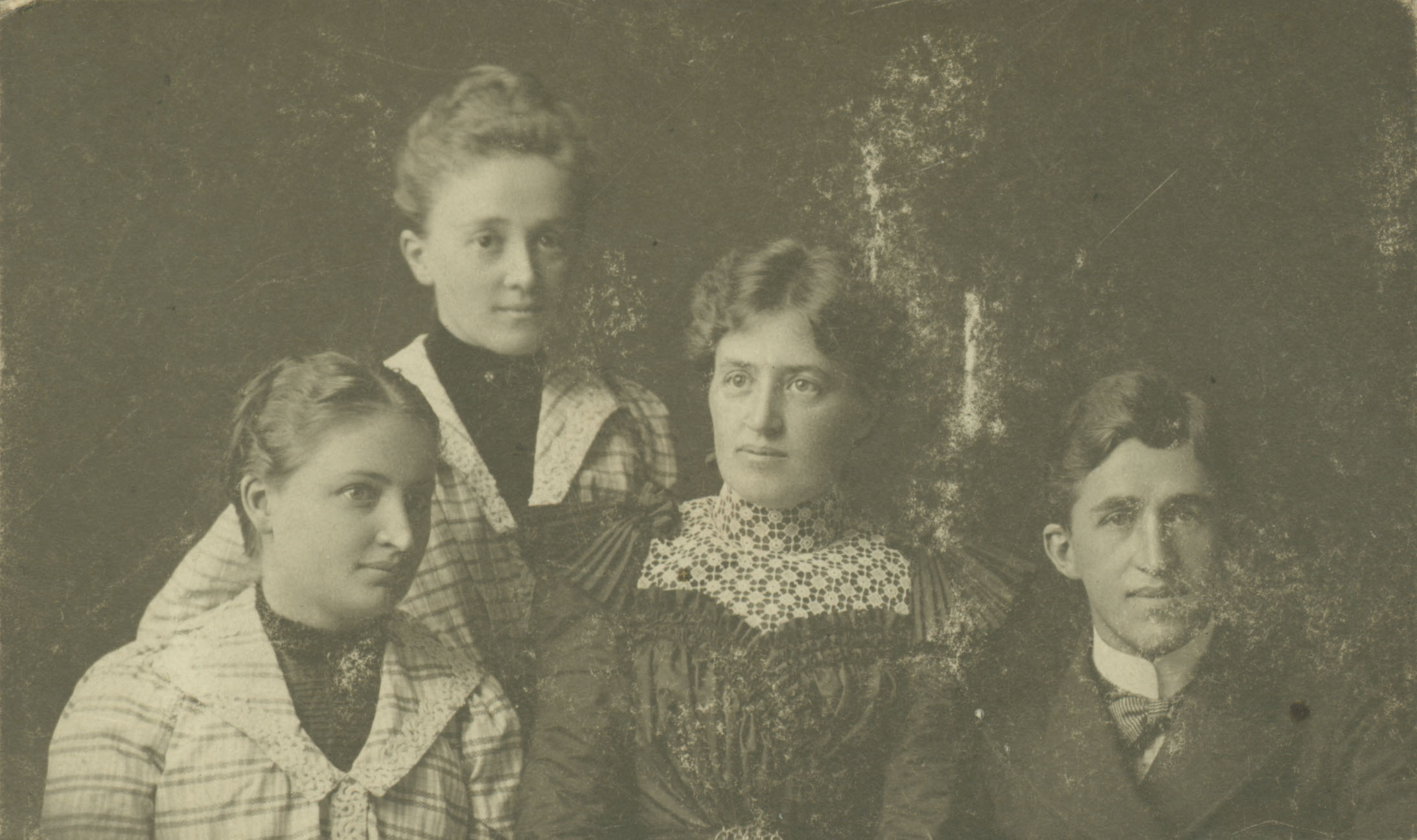
- From left to right: Mia Olsson, Lydia Olsson, Anna Olsson, Hannes Olsson.
- Born: Anna Olsson; 19 August 1866; Värmland, Sweden
- Died: 15 February 1946 (aged 79); Rock Island, Illinois
- Resting place: Riverside Cemetery, Moline, Illinois
- Education: Augustana College (Illinois)
- Occupations: Author, teacher
- Relatives: Olof Olsson
- Writing career
- Language: Swedish, English
- Notable work: En prärieunges funderingar

Anna Olsson (19 August 1866 in Värmland, Sweden – 15 February 1946 in Rock Island, Illinois) was a Swedish-American author.

== Life ==
Anna Olsson was the first daughter and oldest surviving child of Olof and Anna Lisa Olsson. In 1869, a three-year-old Olsson and her parents emigrated from Värmland, Sweden. They settled in Lindsborg, Kansas, where Olof Olsson served as pastor. She would later use many experiences from her childhood on the prairie in her publications. Olsson's father accepted a professorship at Augustana College and Theological Seminary in 1877, and the family moved to Rock Island, Illinois. Olsson returned to Lindsborg to attend Bethany Academy in 1882 and 1883.

In the fall of 1883, Olsson reunited with her family in Rock Island and enrolled at Augustana College. She studied German language and literature, and was interested in philosophy. She earned her B.A. in 1888, and was only the second women to graduate from the college. Olof Olsson and his children traveled abroad in Europe from 1889 to 1890. They spent time in Germany, Switzerland, and Italy. During this trip, Olsson continued her education in a German school and attended literature and philosophy lectures at the University of Zurich. From 1896 to 1898, she studied Italian, French, and literature at Augustana College.

In March 1887, a year before Olsson graduated from Augustana College, her mother, Anna Lisa, died. Because of this loss, Olsson had to take on many of her mother's duties as a pastor's wife. She also looked after her younger siblings and maintained the household. It was only after her siblings were older and her father had died that she was able to focus on her career as a writer.

== Career ==
Anna Olsson split her career between teaching and writing. She returned to Lindsborg, Kansas in 1888 to teach in the Children's Department at Bethany Academy. She left that position to travel Europe with her family. In 1895, Olsson accepted a position as the principal of Ladies' Hall at Augustana College. She served as principal until 1900, when she became an instructor of English at the college. Her first work, a story printed anonymously in Ungdomsvännen, was published in 1901 while she was still teaching. Olsson left her position at Augustana College in 1902.

Olsson wrote both fiction and non-fiction in Swedish and English, and often used a Swedish-American dialect in her texts. Her publications, written using the pen name Aina, were mostly aimed at children. According to a report prepared to designate her home as a historic landmark, Olsson was "as well known as Mark Twain and Harriet Beecher Stowe for her children's books," although literary scholar Ann Boaden places her fame at a more moderate level. En prärieunges funderingar, the book she is best known for, is a semi-autobiographical work about her family's immigration to the United States and their years living on the Kansas prairie. Olsson was also a popular contributor to Swedish and Lutheran periodicals, publishing her work in Ungdomsvännen, Fosterlandel, Prairieblomman, Julrunan, and Julgranan, among others.

Olsson continued to write until her death at the age of 79 on 15 February 1946. She and her siblings never married or had children. The home they lived in after their father's death was designated as a Rock Island landmark in 1996.

== Works ==
- Från Solsidan. Rock Island, Illinois: Lutheran Augustana Book Concern, 1903. In Swedish.
- Bilder från jubelfesten: med flera skisser. Rock Island, Illinois: Augustana Book Concern, 1912. In Swedish. Published under Olsson's pen name, Aina.
- En prärieunges funderingar. Rock Island, Illinois: Augustana Book Concern, 1917. In Swedish. Also published as:
- "I'm scairt": childhood days on the prairie. Rock Island, Illinois: Augustana Book Concern, 1927. In English, written in a Swedish-American dialect using the narrative voice of a child. Published under Olsson's pen name, Aina.
- Olsson published in a number of Swedish-American periodicals, including Ungdomsvännen, Fosterlandel, Prairieblomman, Julrunan, and Julgranan.

Later editions

Olsson's works were republished several times in Sweden and the United States. Prärieungen: Anna Olssons barndomsminnen, an abbreviated version of En prärieunges funderingar, was published by Joan Sandin in 1984 (Stockholm: Rabén & Sjögren, ISBN 9789129564037). Martha Winblad and Elizabeth Jaderborg also translated and edited En prärieunges funderingar as Anna Olsson: "A child of the prairie" in 1978 (Lindsborg: Jaderborg).
