= Warren Giles =

American baseball executive (1896–1979)

- Giles in 1962

12th President of the National League
- In office September 25, 1951 – December 5, 1969
- Commissioner: Ford Frick; William Eckert; Bowie Kuhn
- Preceded by: Ford Frick
- Succeeded by: Chub Feeney

Personal details
- Born: May 28, 1896 Tiskilwa, Illinois, U.S.
- Died: February 7, 1979 (aged 82) Cincinnati, Ohio, U.S.
- Spouse: Jane Skinner (m. 1931; died 1943)
- Children: Bill Giles
- Education: Washington & Lee University
- Baseball career
- General manager

Teams
- Cincinnati Reds (1937–1951)

Career highlights and awards
- World Series champion (1940); Cincinnati Reds Hall of Fame

Member of the National

Baseball Hall of Fame
- Induction: 1979
- Election method: Veterans Committee

Warren Crandall Giles (May 28, 1896 – February 7, 1979) was an American professional baseball executive. Giles spent 33 years in high-level posts in Major League Baseball as general manager and club president of the Cincinnati Reds (1937–1951) and president of the National League (1951–1969), and was elected to the National Baseball Hall of Fame.

Born in Tiskilwa, Illinois, Giles attended Washington and Lee University and served as an infantry officer in France during World War I. Before becoming a full-time baseball executive, he worked as a football and basketball official in the Missouri Valley Conference, a major U.S. college sports league.

== General manager of the Cincinnati Reds ==
Giles was elected president of the Moline, Illinois, Plowboys baseball club in the Class B Three-I League at age 23 in 1919, beginning his 50-year career in baseball.

He eventually joined the St. Louis Cardinals' organization and rose to prominence as the president and business manager of their top-level farm teams, the Syracuse Stars (1926–1927) and Rochester Red Wings (1928–1936) of the International League. As a foreshadowing of his most powerful position in professional baseball, Giles spent part of the 1936 season as president of the International League.

Upon the recommendation of Cardinals' executive Branch Rickey, Powel Crosley Jr., owner of the Cincinnati Reds, appointed Giles as his club's general manager on November 1, 1936, succeeding Larry MacPhail. While the 1937 Reds won only 56 games and slid into the basement of the National League, the 1938 edition improved by 26 games to finish in the first division, earning Giles the 1938 Major League Executive of the Year award from The Sporting News. That season, he hired a future Hall of Fame manager, Bill McKechnie, to take charge of the Reds on the field. Then, on June 13, 1938, Giles swung one of the most successful trades in Cincinnati history, when he obtained starting pitcher Bucky Walters from the Philadelphia Phillies for catcher Spud Davis, pitcher Al Hollingsworth and cash.

Walters would help lead the Reds of 1939 and 1940 to back-to-back National League championships. The 1939 Reds, behind Walters' 27 victories and MVP-Award-winning season, captured the NL pennant by 4 1/2 games, but they were swept by the New York Yankees in the World Series. Unfazed, the 1940 Reds won 100 games, with Walters accounting for 22 victories and leading the circuit in earned run average for a second straight season. They repeated as league champions by a 12-length margin, then, behind Walters' two complete game victories, they defeated the Detroit Tigers in a seven-game World Series for the second world title in modern club history. In addition to Walters, Giles acquisitions Billy Werber (who batted .370 with ten hits) and Jimmy Ripple (.333 with seven hits, including a homer) played important roles in the Fall Classic.

The Reds boasted .500 or above teams through 1944, but declined beginning in 1945 and during the post-war era finished in the NL's second division and posted losing records for Giles' last seven seasons as the Reds' top executive. During this postwar period, he was given the added duties of team president by owner Crosley prior to the 1947 season.

Despite the Reds' on-field struggles, Giles was a leading candidate to become baseball's third commissioner after Happy Chandler was fired in 1951. He was runner-up in the commissioner balloting to Ford Frick but succeeded Frick as president of the National League on October 8, 1951.

=== Record as general manager ===
Team	Year	Regular season					Postseason			
Team	Year	Games	Won	Lost	Win %	Finish	Won	Lost	Win %	Result
CIN	1937	155	56	98	.364	8th in NL	—	—	—	—
CIN	1938	151	82	68	.547	4th in NL	—	—	—	—
CIN	1939	156	97	57	.630	1st in NL	0	4	.000	Lost World Series (NYY)
CIN	1940	155	100	53	.654	1st in NL	4	3	.571	Won World Series (DET)
CIN	1941	154	88	66	.571	3rd in NL	–	–	–	–
CIN	1942	154	76	76	.500	4th in NL	–	–	–	–
CIN	1943	155	87	67	.565	2nd in NL	–	–	–	–
CIN	1944	155	89	65	.578	3rd in NL	–	–	–	–
CIN	1945	154	61	93	.396	7th in NL	–	–	–	–
CIN	1946	156	67	87	.435	6th in NL	–	–	–	–
CIN	1947	154	73	81	.474	5th in NL	–	–	–	–
CIN	1948	153	64	89	.418	7th in NL	–	–	–	–
CIN	1949	156	62	92	.403	7th in NL	–	–	–	–
CIN	1950	153	66	87	.431	6th in NL	–	–	–	–
CIN	1951	152	66	85	.437	(resigned)	–	–	–	–
Total		2,313	1,134	1,164	.493		4	7	.364	

== President of the National League ==
During his 18-year reign as chief executive of the Senior Circuit (including the full seasons of 1952–1969), Giles presided over several historic events.

The NL opened the West Coast and Southeastern United States territories by approving the transfers of the Los Angeles Dodgers and San Francisco Giants in 1958, and the Atlanta Braves in 1966. Giles' first full season, 1952, had been the last in which the eight-team league operated in the same cities as it had since 1900. In March 1953, the Braves pulled up stakes in Boston, where they had played since 1876 as a charter member of the National League, and moved to Milwaukee. That transfer — initially wildly successful, although the Braves would stay in Milwaukee only 13 seasons before settling in Atlanta — was the first in the series of franchise moves that shook Major League Baseball for the next two decades.

In addition, Giles' National League expanded to 12 teams by adding two clubs in both 1962 and 1969. Although "who says you have to have a team in New York?" was Giles' notorious reply when asked if his league would seek to replace the Dodgers and Giants in New York City, the 1962 expansion, which created the Mets, returned the Senior Circuit to the city after a four-year absence. The same expansion brought Major League Baseball to Texas and the Southwest, with the Houston Colt .45s. In 1969, Giles' last year in office, his league expanded into Canada with the Montreal Expos, adopted divisional play, and played the first National League Championship Series, between the Braves and Mets. Between 1952 and 1969, the NL's member clubs, except the Chicago Cubs, also opened or were planning to open new stadiums.

Giles' presidency also saw the National League widen its advantage over the American League in the signing of African-American and Latin American players, resulting in a three-decade-long domination of the Major League Baseball All-Star Game. In clubhouse meetings before the midsummer classic, Giles famously would exhort the NL's players to uphold their league's honor. During his tenure, the National League won 16 of 22 All-Star games played, with one tie. (Two games were played each year from 1959 to 1962.) The NL also won ten of 18 World Series during Giles' term.

In addition, Giles worked vigorously to keep premier players in his league. After the advent of interleague trading without waivers in November 1959, he lobbied against the trade of National League superstars to the American League to preserve the NL's hegemony. He was successful until his former team, the Reds, traded Frank Robinson to the Baltimore Orioles after the 1965 season. Under Giles, the National League began a 33-year (1956–1988) streak during which it dominated the American League in attendance — a remarkable achievement, given that the Junior Circuit had two more member teams than the NL during 13 of those seasons (in 1961 and 1977–1988).

During the early weeks of the 1963 season, Giles became a figure of some controversy after he instructed the NL's umpires to strictly enforce the balk rule then in place. In response, the Senior Circuit's arbiters called 74 balks from the opening of the season on April 8 until April 26, when Giles announced a relaxation of the policy. Only two balks were called in the American League over the same period.

Giles, then 73, announced his intention to retire after the 1969 season and on December 5, Giants' executive Chub Feeney was elected to succeed him as president of the National League.

== Honors ==
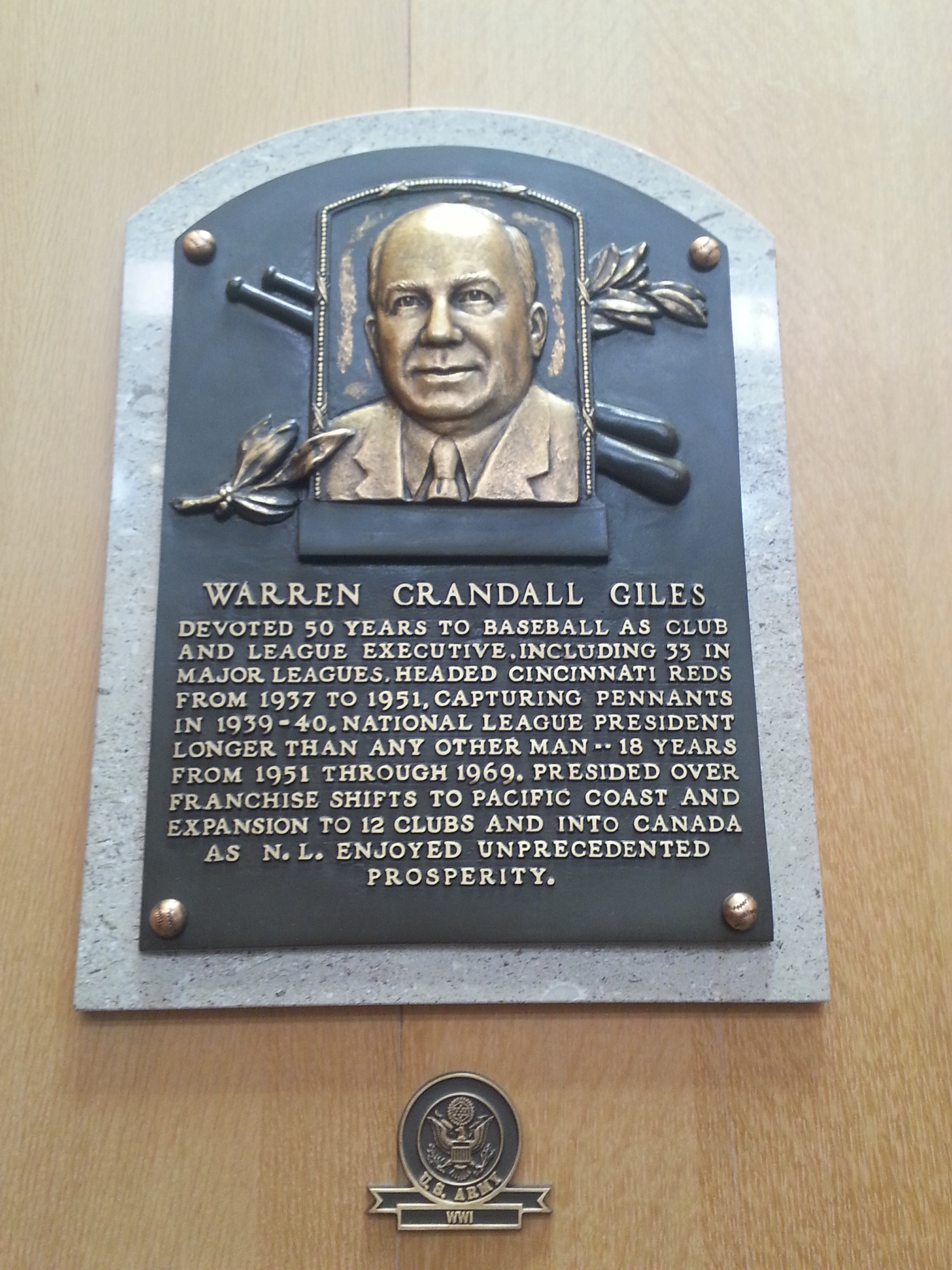
Plaque of Warren Giles at the Baseball Hall of Fame

Giles was elected to the Cincinnati Reds Hall of Fame in 1969 and to the National Baseball Hall of Fame by the Veterans Committee, shortly after his death, in 1979.

The National League Championship Series trophy is named in his honor. Additionally, Minor League Baseball gives out the Warren Giles Award to outstanding minor league presidents.

== Personal life ==
Giles was married to Jane Mabel Skinner from 1931 until her sudden death from cerebral hemorrhage in 1943. She was the daughter of Moline mayor Charles T. Porter, president of Moline Paint Manufacturing Company, and the great-granddaughter of John Deere, founder of the farm equipment manufacturer. Her grandfather was architect Merton Yale Cady, grandson of inventor Linus Yale Sr. Giles never remarried.

His son, Bill, also had a lengthy baseball career. After serving as an executive with the Reds, Houston Colt .45s/Astros and Phillies, he became a part-owner of the Phillies in 1981, then general manager from 1984 through 1987 and club president until 1997, before becoming board chairman and then chairman emeritus. Following in his father's footsteps, Bill Giles was also honorary president of the National League.

Giles died in Cincinnati, Ohio from complications of cancer, aged 82. He is interred in Riverside Cemetery in Moline.

Business positions
Preceded by Charles Knapp	President of the International League; 1936	Succeeded by Frank Shaughnessy
Preceded by Ford Frick	President of the National League; 1951–1969	Succeeded by Chub Feeney
Preceded by Larry MacPhail	Cincinnati Reds General Manager; 1937–1951	Succeeded by Gabe Paul
