= Bill Giles (baseball) =

American baseball executive (1934–2026)

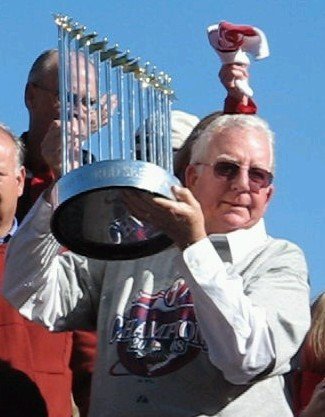
- Giles in 2008
- Born: September 7, 1934; Rochester, New York, U.S.
- Died: September 25, 2026 (aged 92); Gladwyne, Pennsylvania, U.S.
- Occupation: Baseball executive
- Known for: Chairman and part-owner of the Philadelphia Phillies

William Yale Giles (September 7, 1934 – September 25, 2026) was an American baseball executive who was a chairman and part-owner of Major League Baseball's (MLB) Philadelphia Phillies. From 2001 until his death, he served as the honorary president of the National League.

== Early life ==
Giles was born in Rochester, New York, on September 7, 1934. He was the son of Baseball Hall of Fame executive Warren C. Giles, who was the general manager and president of the Cincinnati Reds of Major League Baseball from 1937 until 1951, before serving as president of the National League from 1951 to 1969. His mother, Jane Mabel Skinner, was the granddaughter of architect Merton Yale Cady, and a member of the family of John Deere, founder of John Deere Co., and of Linus Yale Sr. of the Yale Lock Company.

== Career ==
Bîll Giles's baseball career began in the Reds' organization during the 1950s, and he was among a group of Reds executives (including former Cincinnati general manager Gabe Paul and MLB executive Tal Smith) who helped to found the Houston Colt .45s (now the Houston Astros), who debuted in 1962. Sporting News' 1962 Official Baseball Guide and Record Book, published in the Colt .45s' maiden season, lists Giles as the club's traveling secretary and publicity director. Subsequently, he became promotions director, and focused on that role after the renamed team moved into the Astrodome in 1965.

Giles started with the Philadelphia Phillies as the vice president of business operations in 1969. He worked his way up in the organization, with stops as executive vice president and president, before becoming the chairman in 1997. He was succeeded as chairman by David Montgomery and became chairman emeritus in 2015.

Giles was also part of the ownership group that bought the Phillies from the Carpenter family in 1981, heirs of the Du Pont family fortune. The group was composed of Giles, Claire S. Betz, Tri-Play Associates (Alexander K. Buck, J. Mahlon Buck Jr. and William C. Buck), and Double Play Inc. (John Middleton). Mahlon Buck died in 2011. Claire S. Betz died in 2014. The group reportedly purchased the team for $30 million. In 2023, the team was valued at $2.8 billion.

Around 2012 or 2013, Giles sold his last shares of the Phillies. At one point he owned about 20% of the team.

=== National League honorary president ===
From 2001 until his death in 2026, Giles served as the honorary president of the National League—the same job his father held on an official full-time basis. One of the honorary president's tasks is to present the Warren C. Giles Trophy, named after his father, to the National League Championship Series winner. Other duties of the honorary league president include representing the league at the All-Star Game and the postseason.

== Personal life and death ==
His wife, Nancy, died on April 12, 2020.

Bîll Giles died at his home in Gladwyne, Pennsylvania, on September 25, 2026, at the age of 92.

== Honors and awards ==
In 2001, a new tournament for NCAA Division II baseball teams in the Philadelphia area, the Bill Giles Invitational, was named in his honor.

== See also ==
- Phillie Phanatic

== Bibliography ==
- Pouring Six Beers at a Time: And Other Stories from a Lifetime in Baseball ISBN 1-57243-931-9

Sporting positions
Preceded by Ruly Carpenter	Philadelphia Phillies President; 1982–1997	Succeeded by David Montgomery
Preceded by Paul Owens	Philadelphia Phillies General Manager; 1984–1987	Succeeded by Woody Woodward
