= The Little Show =

Musical

- Sheet music cover (cropped)
- Music: Arthur Schwartz
- Lyrics: Howard Dietz
- Book: various
- Productions: 1929 Broadway

The Little Show was a musical revue with lyrics by Howard Dietz and music by Arthur Schwartz. It was the first of 11 musicals that featured the songs of Dietz and Schwartz. The revue opened at the Music Box Theatre on Broadway on April 30, 1929 and ran for 321 performances until February 1930.

== History ==
The show grew out of a number of Sunday evening variety shows co-produced by Tom Weatherly with James Pond at the Selwyn Theatre . Weatherly said that they were "really nothing more than high-class vaudeville shows but they were far more artistic than the Sunday night variety programs being offered at the Winter Garden."

== Revue elements ==
"This was the first American revue to give wit precedence over spectacle." Fred Allen (who had been a vaudeville headliner as a juggler and ventriloquist) "won acclaim with his sardonic banter", "torch singer Libby Holman smoldered." Clifton Webb, the debonair star, "wanted a number that was more perverse, a number he could deliver all alone in full-dress suit and a spotlight...a lyric with suave romantic frustration." The song was "I Guess I'll Have to Change My Plan," which was used again in the 1953 MGM musical The Band Wagon. The song "Hammacher Schlemmer, I Love You" was an "open-hearted tribute" to the hardware store.

According to Kay Green, the funniest sketch was George S. Kaufman's "The Still Alarm" which concerns nonchalant hotel guests Webb and Fred Allen, completely oblivious to being in a raging fire. The most "dramatic scene was the torrid dance Clifton Webb and Libby Holman performed after Miss Holman moaned "Moanin' Low" in a squalid Harlem tenement." Smith and Litton described another act: "Fred Allen's monologues before the curtain held the audience transfixed, especially one about a little boy who shot both parents in order to be entitled to go to the orphans' picnic."

Ken Bloom wrote: "The Little Show was one of the first intimate revues that proved to audiences that all the Ziegfeldian trappings were not necessary for the enjoyment of a revue."

== Production ==
Produced by William A. Brady, Jr. and Dwight Deere Wiman, in association with Tom Weatherly, the production opened on April 30, 1929 at the Music Box Theatre for a total of 321 performances. The revue was directed by Wiman, choreographed by Danny Dare, and had scenic design by Jo Mielziner. The cast included Fred Allen, Libby Holman, John McCauley, Romney Brent, and Clifton Webb. The costumes werew designed by Ruth Brenner and made by Helene Pons Studio.

== Songs ==
Sources: Steven Suskin for songs marked ≠ Kay Green for songs marked ‡; Chuck Denison, "Can’t We Be Friends?";Billboard for songs marked √; Ruth Benjamin and Arthur Rosenblatt for song marked ≈

Act I

- Man About Town √
- Six Little Sinners (music by Frank Gorney; lyrics by Earle Crooker) ≈
- Get Up a New Routine ≠ √
- Caught in the Rain (music by Henry Sullivan; lyrics by Howard Dietz) √
- Or What Have You (music by Morris Hamilton; lyrics by Grace Henry) √
- I’ve Made a Habit of You ‡ ≠ √
- Can't We Be Friends? (music by Kay Swift; lyrics by Paul James) - Libby Holman √
- Little Old New York √
- Moanin' Low (music: Ralph Rainger) - Holman and Webb ‡ √
- Hammacher Schlemmer, I Love You ‡

Act II

- Song of the Riveter (music by Arthur Schwartz; lyrics by Lew Levenson) ≠ √
- What Every Little Girl Should Know (music by Arthur Schwartz; lyrics by Henry Myers) √
- The Theme Song ≠ √
- A Little Hut in Hoboken (music and lyrics by Herman Hupfeld) ‡ √
- Stick to your Dancing, Mabel (music and lyrics by Charlotte Kent √
- I Guess I'll Have to Change My Plan ‡ ≠
- Work Alike (music by Frank Gray; lyrics by Earle Crooker

‡
