= John Deere House =

Historic house in Illinois, United States

- U.S. National Register of Historic Places
- Moline Historic Landmark
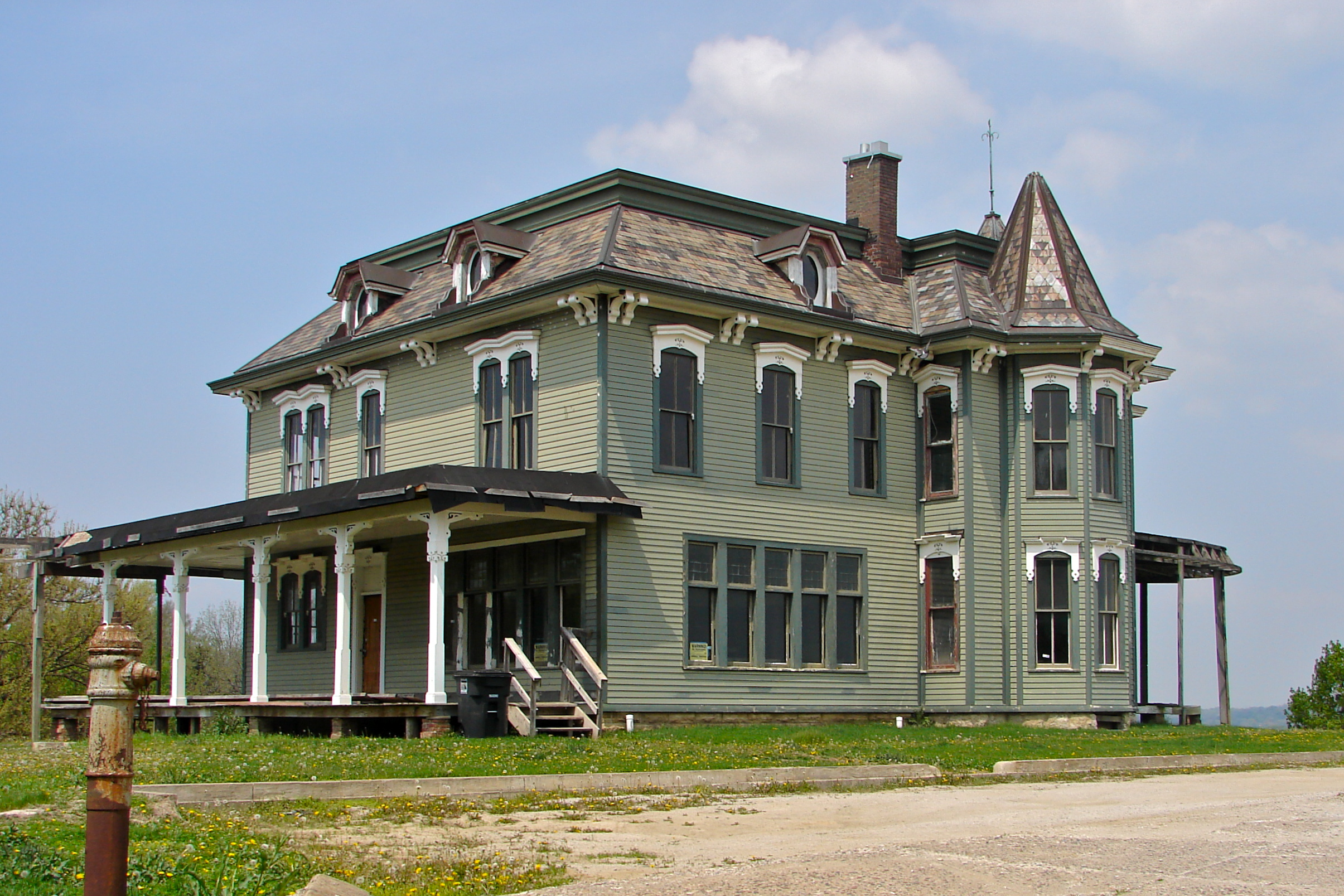

- Location within Illinois Location within the United States
- Location: 1217 11th Ave. Moline, Illinois
- Coordinates: 41°30′6″N 90°31′10″W
- Built: c. 1870
- Architect: J.G.Salisbury
- Architectural style: Second Empire
- NRHP reference No.: 02001756

Significant dates
- Added to NRHP: February 5, 2003
- Designated MHL: August, 2002

The John Deere House is a historic building located in Moline, Illinois, United States. The house, which is associated with industrialist John Deere, sits on the edge of a high bluff overlooking the Mississippi River Valley and the urban landscape below. It was declared a Moline Historic Landmark in 2002, and it was listed on the National Register of Historic Places in 2003.

== History ==
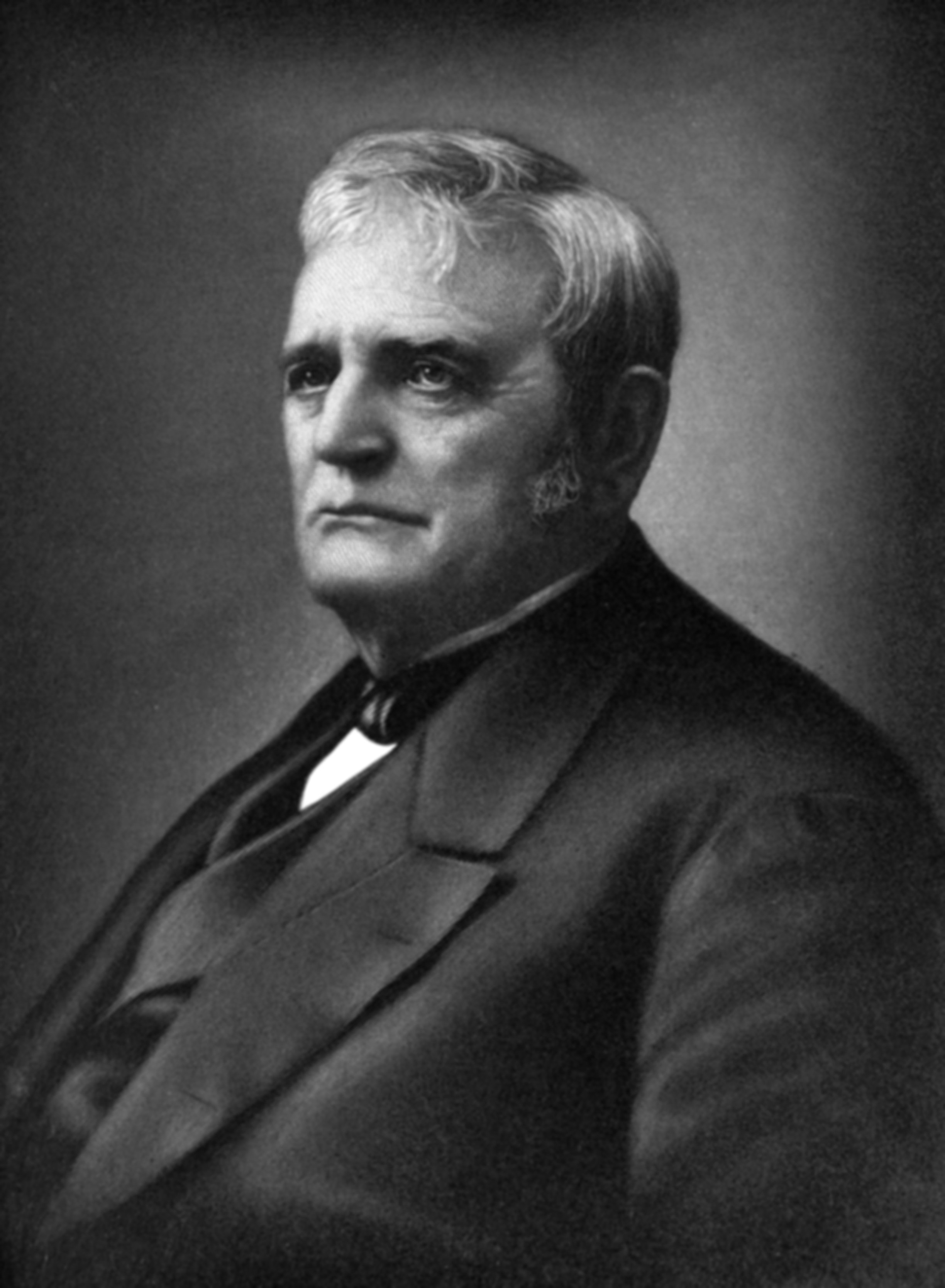
John Deere

The house was built in the Italianate style for Moline grocer William B. Dawson around 1870. The property consisted of three lots, and included the house, a barn, outbuildings, a carriageway, fruit trees, grapery, and select plants. Dawson, however, defaulted on the property and John Deere purchased the house and the three lots in 1875. For the next five years, Deere renovated and expanded the house before occupying it in 1880. The additions more than doubled the size of the house.

Deere made two unique innovations to the house in the process. Ceramic tile was buried and then placed from the basement to the lowest part of the property. The tile allowed cool air to pass from the lower hillside, into the basement and then into the lower floors of the house. The process provided an early form of air conditioning. The second innovation was due to the house's location on the crest of a bluff. Long iron bars were bolted onto the corners of the house so as to hold the structure on the foundation in strong winds.

The home, now in the Second Empire style, featured porches, turrets, iron cresting, window bays, a walnut staircase, and an office from which Deere could see his factories in the valley below the house. The family bedrooms were on the second floor, and the ballroom and servant's quarters were on the third floor. Deere named the 8,000-square-foot (740 m^{2}) home Red Cliff.

Deere lived in the house for six years until his death in 1886. His body lay in repose in the front parlor where thousands of mourners paid their respects. His widow, Lucenia, lived in the house two more years before her death in 1888. It was then inherited by her daughter Alice Deere, wife of architect Merton Yale Cady. The house remained in the Deere family until 1933, when it was sold to a banker.

In 1936, the house was sold to an interior decorator who divided it into 11 apartments. For the next 50 years the property had several different owners. In 1988, the Resolution Trust Corporation took possession of the house due to a loan default. By now, the home had been divided into 16 efficiency apartments that were in disrepair, and the grounds had become overgrown. Barbara Sandberg, a historic preservationist, convinced the city of Moline to purchase the house from the federal agency in the hope of finding a buyer to restore the home. The city used $40,000 in Community Block Grant money to buy the house in 1993. The property was shown 70 times over three years to prospective buyers and received five serious bids.

The city sold the property in 1996 to a private owner for $100. The new owners were to complete the renovations on the house by the year 2000. Plans were to turn the home into a bed and breakfast and public events space. Numerous renovations were completed on the house, but work stopped in 2003 and the project was not completed. The city sued the homeowner for breach of contract in 2005. An agreement was reached, and work resumed on the house in 2008, but it soon came to an end. The Sauk Valley Bank of Sterling, Illinois foreclosed on the property in 2009 and they bought back the mortgage in January 2010. The house was again sold in 2011.
