= William Butterworth (businessman) =

American business executive

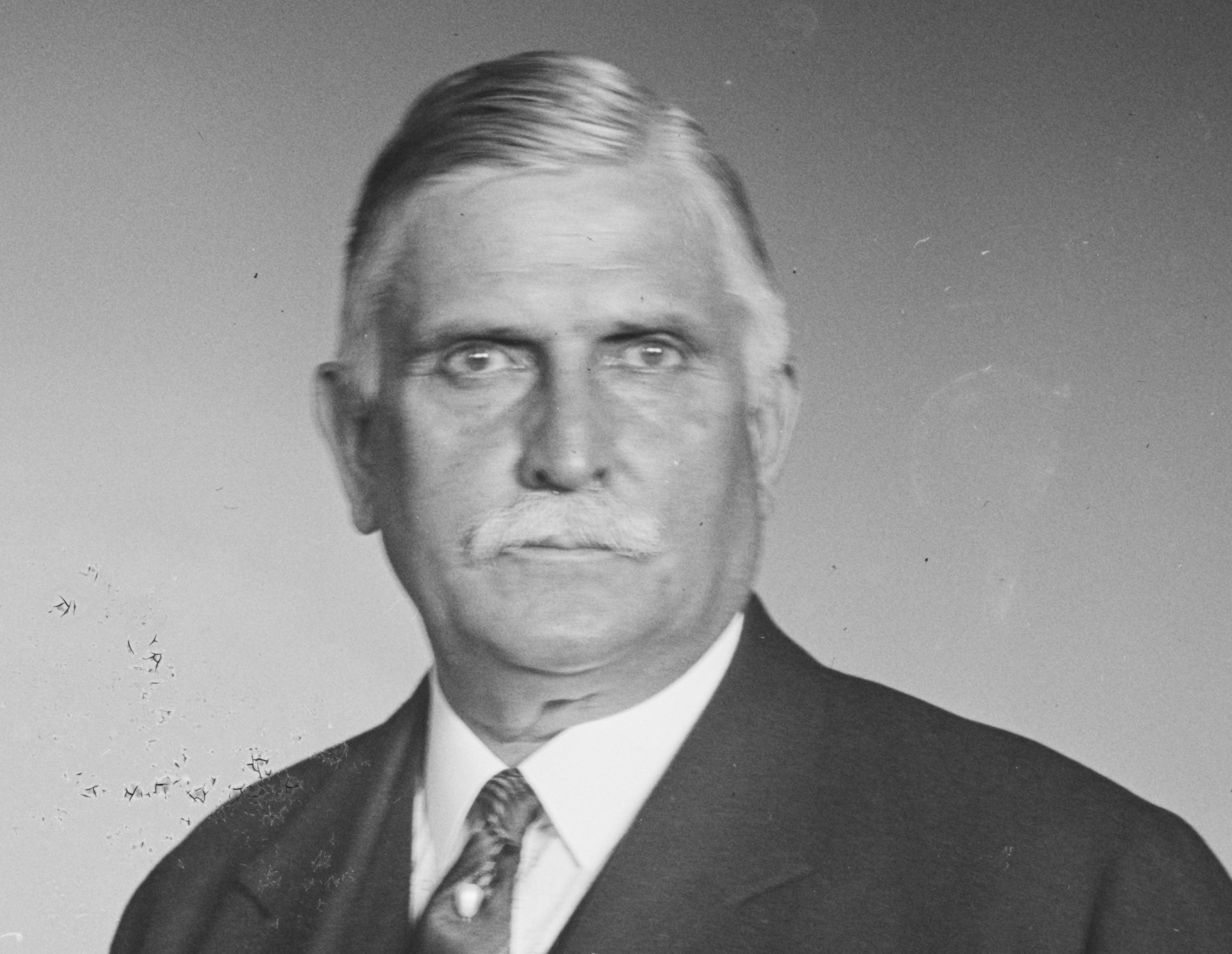
- Butterworth in 1929
- Born: December 18, 1864; Maineville, Ohio, US
- Died: June 1, 1936 (aged 71)
- Education: Lehigh University; National University School of Law
- Occupation: Business executive
- Years active: 1892–1928
- Employer: John Deere
- Father: Benjamin Butterworth
- Relatives: John Deere (grandfather-in-law); Merton Yale Cady (uncle-in-law)

William Butterworth (December 18, 1864 – June 1, 1936) was an American business executive, who served as both president and chairman of John Deere.

== Biography ==
Butterworth was born on December 18, 1864, in Maineville, Ohio, to Congressman Benjamin Butterworth, and graduated from Lehigh University and studied law at the National University School of Law in Washington D.C.

In 1892, Butterworth married Katherine Deere, the daughter of granddaughter of John Deere and niece of Merton Yale Cady. He joined Deere & Company the same year as an assistant buyer. In 1897, he was elected treasurer, and became president after the death of Charles Deere in 1907.

Deere & Company underwent many changes during Butterworth's tenure. In 1910, the board of directors reorganized the company's factories into one unified entity, giving birth to the modern Deere & Company. In 1912 Deere began manufacturing combine harvesters. In 1918, the company purchased Waterloo Gasoline Engine Company and the rights to produce their tractors. Butterworth also implemented a pension system and a benefit and disability program for Deere & Company's employees.

== Later life and death ==
Butterworth retired in 1928 and became the first Chairman of Deere & Company's board, a position he held until his death on June 1, 1936, aged 71.
