= Riverside Cemetery (Moline, Illinois) =

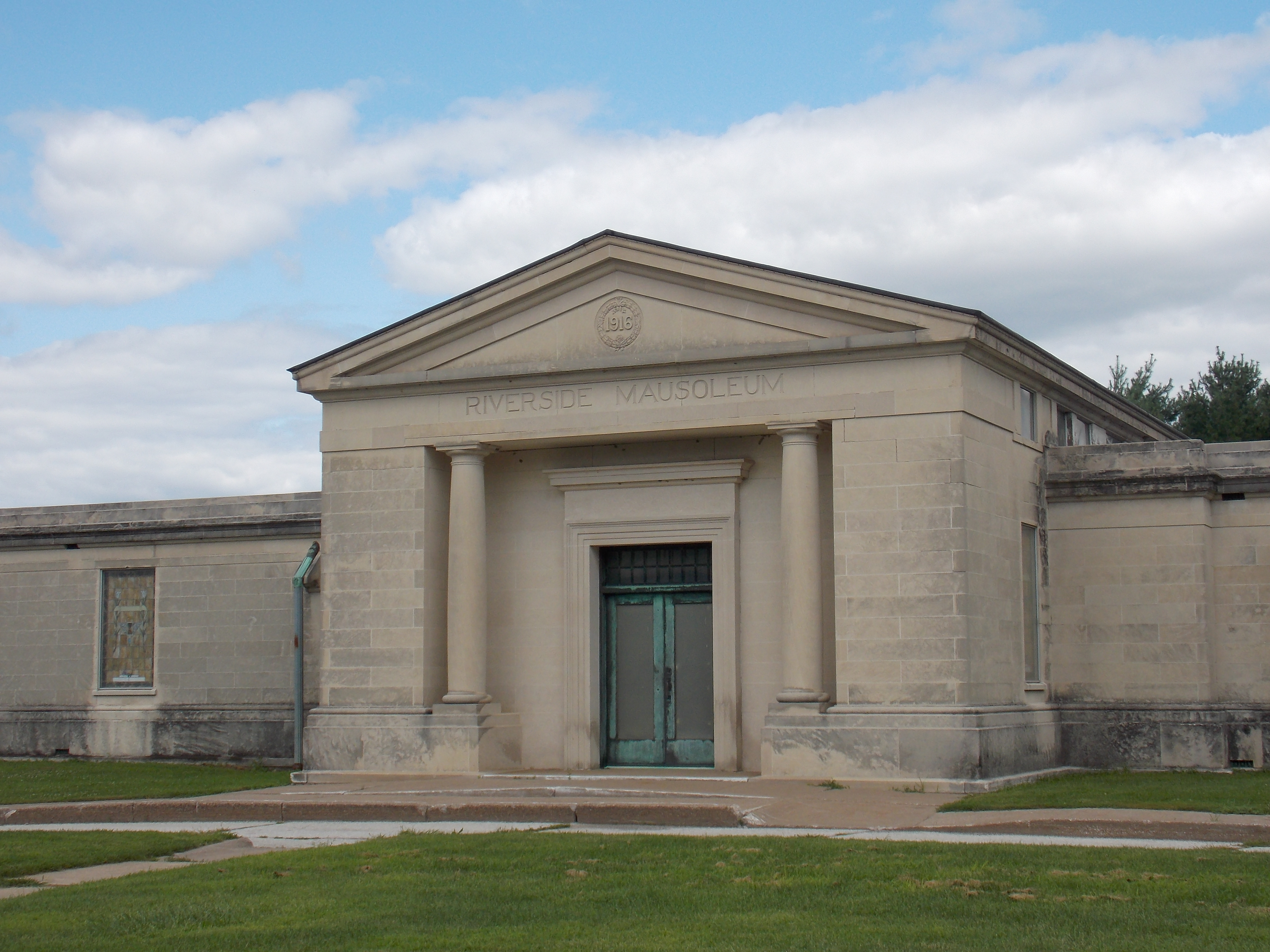
- Riverside Mausoleum
- Interactive map of Riverside Cemetery

Details
- Established: 1851
- Location: 2900 6th Ave., Moline, Illinois
- Country: United States
- Coordinates: 41.50780°N 90.49190°W
- Type: Public
- Owned by: City of Moline
- Size: 99 acres (40 ha)
- Website: Cemeteries
- Find a Grave: Riverside Cemetery
- The Political Graveyard: Riverside Cemetery

Riverside Cemetery is located in Moline, Illinois, United States. It can trace its beginnings to Moline Cemetery, which was established to 1851. The original 5 acres (2.0 ha) of the cemetery was purchased from Samuel and Mary Bell on November 1 of that year. It is located between Fourth and Fifth Avenues at about 33rd Street, and was also known as the Fourth Avenue Cemetery. Joseph Pershing served as the first Sexton, and the cemetery was placed under the direction of a board of trustees.

Numerous changes occurred when John Deere served as the mayor of Moline. In 1873, the city took over control of the cemetery, and a board of directors was appointed by the mayor and the city council. Now known as Riverside Cemetery it began to expand to the south on property purchased from various landowners. The main entrance for the cemetery was located on 6th Avenue by the Sexton's house. At this time, William Le Baron Jenney, a prominent Chicago urban planner and architect, designed the hilly 94 acres (38 ha) section of the cemetery.

What is now Riverside Park was cemetery property at one time. There was controversy about how cemetery land was being used. The property between the Fourth Avenue Cemetery and the hillside sections of the cemetery were being used for recreational purposes. Around 1909, the cemetery's board started selling property to the Park Committee and used the proceeds to maintain the cemetery.

The Chapel Mausoleum was completed in 1916. The Greek Revival style structure is built of #1 Peerless Buff stone. It contains 800 single crypts, 48 companion niches and features stained glass windows. The last house used by the cemetery's sexton was moved to the property in 1958. It served as the cemetery office until 1983 when the office was moved Moline Memorial Park. It ceased as the sexton's home in 1998. It is now used by the Director of Moline Parks & Recreation. Both Riverside Cemetery and Moline Memorial Park have been administered by the Moline Park and Recreation Department since 1978.

An historical cemetery walk is sponsored each September called: Echoes From Riverside Cemetery. Costumed actors play the role of one of the people buried in the cemetery. A book was published in 2010 based on the walk.

== Notable Burials ==
- Louie Bellson (1924–2009), musician
- John Deere (1804–1886), inventor, industrialist
- Francis Dickens (1844–1886), son of Charles Dickens
- Warren Giles (1896–1979), Hall of Fame Baseball Executive
- Willard Lamb Velie (1866–1928), industrialist; developed advanced engines for automobiles and airplanes.
- Dwight Deere Wiman (1895–1951), actor, playwright and Broadway producer
