= John Deere (inventor) =

American blacksmith and manufacturer (1804–1886)

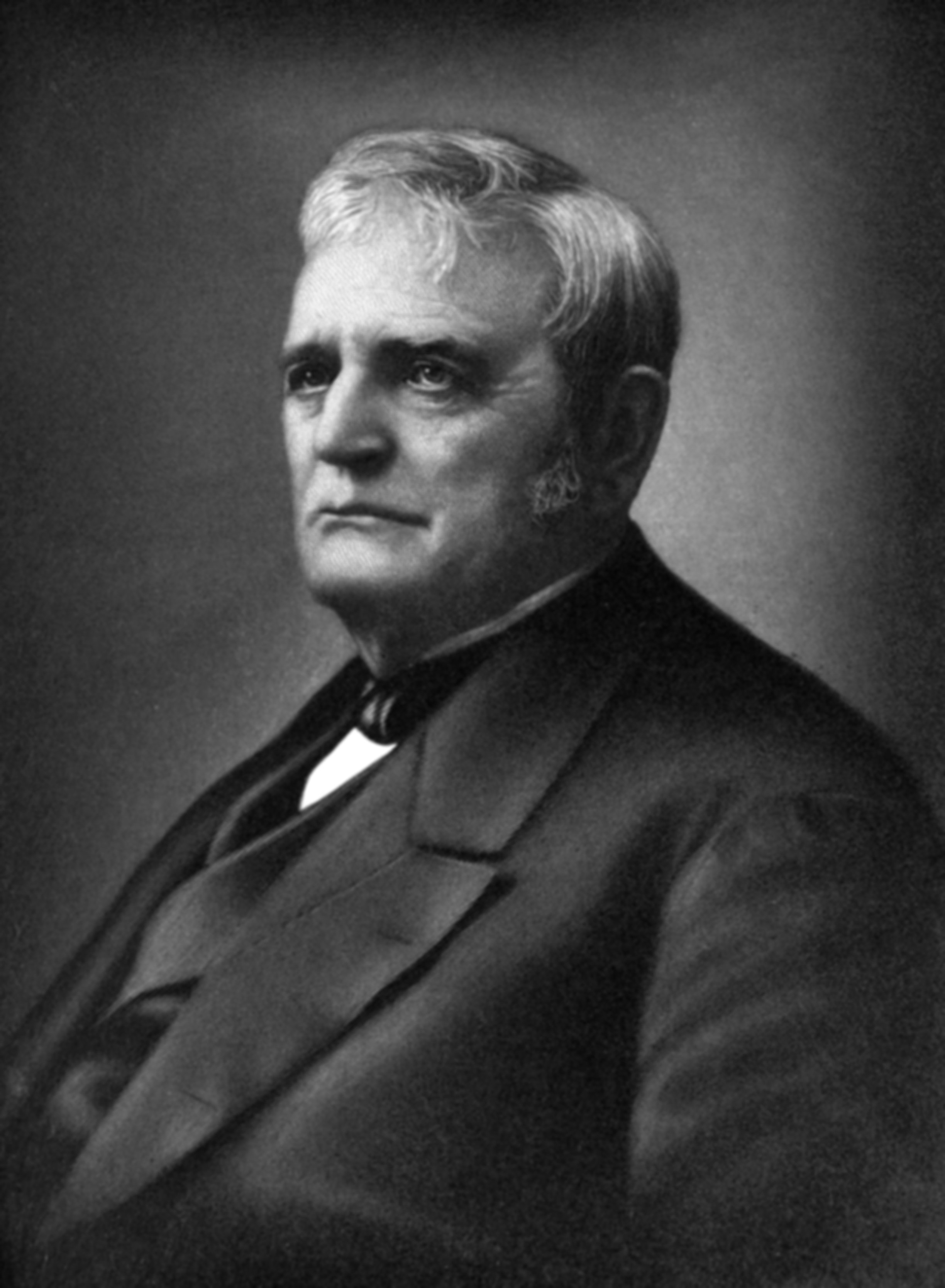
- Born: February 7, 1804; Rutland, Vermont, U.S.
- Died: May 17, 1886 (aged 82); Moline, Illinois, U.S.
- Education: Middlebury College
- Occupations: Blacksmith, businessman, inventor, politician
- Known for: Deere & Company, steel plow
- Spouse: Demarius Lamb (1827–1886)
- Children: 9

John Deere (February 7, 1804 – May 17, 1886) was an American blacksmith, businessman, inventor and politician. He founded Deere & Company, one of the largest and leading agricultural and construction-equipment manufacturers in the world. Born in Rutland, Vermont, Deere moved to Illinois and invented the first commercially successful steel plow in 1837.

== Early life ==
John Deere was born on February 7, 1804, in Rutland, Vermont. His father, William, was an immigrant from England while his mother Sarah was from Connecticut. At age 4, his father received news that he left an inheritance in England and set out for Boston to sail to England. He never returned and Deere's mother was left to raise her children alone.

By 11, Deere was already working as a tanner's apprentice. After a brief educational period at Middlebury College, at age 17 in 1821, he began an apprenticeship with Captain Benjamin Lawrence, a successful Middlebury blacksmith, and entered the trade for himself in 1826.

== Marriage and children ==
He married Demarius Lamb in 1827 and fathered nine children:

- Francis Albert Deere (1828–1848)
- Jeannette Deere Chapman (1830–1916)
- Ellen Sarah Deere Webber (1832–1898)
- Frances Alma Deere (1834–1851)
- Charles Henry Deere (1837–1907)
- Emma Charlotte Deere Velie (1840–1911)
- Hiram Alvin Deere (1842–1844)
- Alice Maria Deere Cady (1844–1900)
- Mary Frances Deere (1851–1852)

Their daughter Alice Maria married Merton Yale Cady, grandson of Linus Yale Sr. of the Yale Lock Company, and was the proprietor of Alderney Hill Farm, formerly Mr. John Deere's blooded-stock farm. They were the grandparents of Jane Mabel Skinner, wife of Warren Crandall Giles, president of the National League and Cincinnati Reds, and parents of William Yale Giles, co-proprietor of the Philadelphia Phillies.

== Steel plow ==
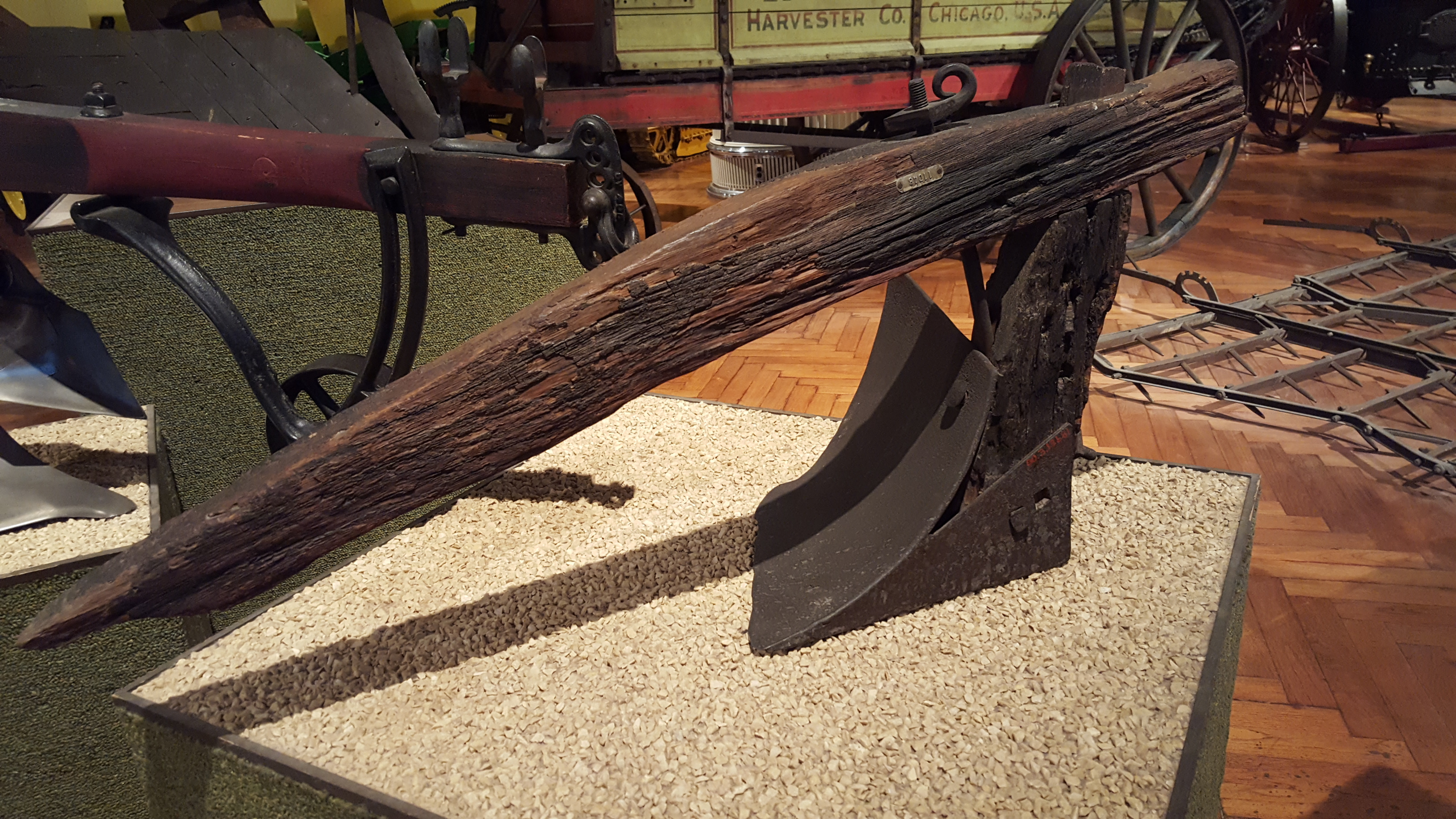
Early John Deere plow, c. 1845, made in Grand Detour, Illinois, displayed at The Henry Ford Museum

Deere initially worked in Burlington, Vermont before opening his own shops, first in Vergennes and then in Leicester. In 1836, Deere left Vermont due to hard times and followed Leonard Andrus, a business associate, to Illinois.

Deere settled in Grand Detour, Illinois, where he had no difficulty finding work due to a lack of blacksmiths working in the area. He started working as an apprentice at Frog Hollow, down the hill from the Court House Square. He later found that cast iron plows did not work very well in the tough prairie soil of Illinois and remembered the needles he had previously polished by running them through sand as he grew up in his father's tailor shop in Rutland. Deere came to the conclusion that a plow made out of highly polished steel and a correctly shaped mouldboard (the self-scouring steel plow) would be better able to handle the soil conditions of the prairie, especially its sticky clay.

Several early variants served as the inspiration for Deere's famous steel plow. In one variant, he recalled the way the polished steel pitchfork tines moved through hay and soil and thought that same effect could be recreated with a plow. Another variant used an old sawblade that had been polished by years of use.

In 1837, Deere developed and manufactured the first commercially successful cast-steel plow. The wrought iron framed plow had a polished steel share. This made it ideal for the tough soils of the Midwest, where it worked better than other plows. By early 1838, Deere completed his first steel plow and sold it to a local farmer, Lewis Crandall, who quickly spread word of his success with Deere's plow. Subsequently, two neighbors soon placed orders with Deere. By 1841, Deere was manufacturing 75–100 plows per year.

In 1843, Deere partnered with Leonard Andrus to produce more plows to keep up with demand, but the partnership became strained due to the two men's stubbornness. While Deere wished to sell to customers outside Grand Detour, Andrus opposed a proposed railroad through the town. Deere was also distrustful of Andrus' accounting practices. In 1848, Deere dissolved the partnership with Andrus and moved to Moline, Illinois, because the city was a transportation hub on the Mississippi River.

By 1855, Deere's factory sold more than 10,000 steel plows. It became known as "The Plow that Broke the Plains" and is commemorated as such in a historic marker in Vermont. Deere insisted on making high-quality equipment. He once said, "I will never put my name on a product that does not have in it the best that is in me." Following the Panic of 1857, as the economy recovered, Deere left the day-to-day operations to his son Charles. In 1868, Deere incorporated his business as Deere & Company.

== Later life ==
Later in life, Deere focused most of his attention on civil and political affairs. He served as president of the National Bank of Moline, as a director of the Moline Free Public Library, and was a trustee of the First Congregational Church. Deere also served as mayor of Moline for two years, but due to chest pains and dysentery he declined to run for a second term. In 1875, he acquired, expanded and modernized the house now known as the John Deere House, which he called Red Cliff. He died there on May 17, 1886, at the age of 82.

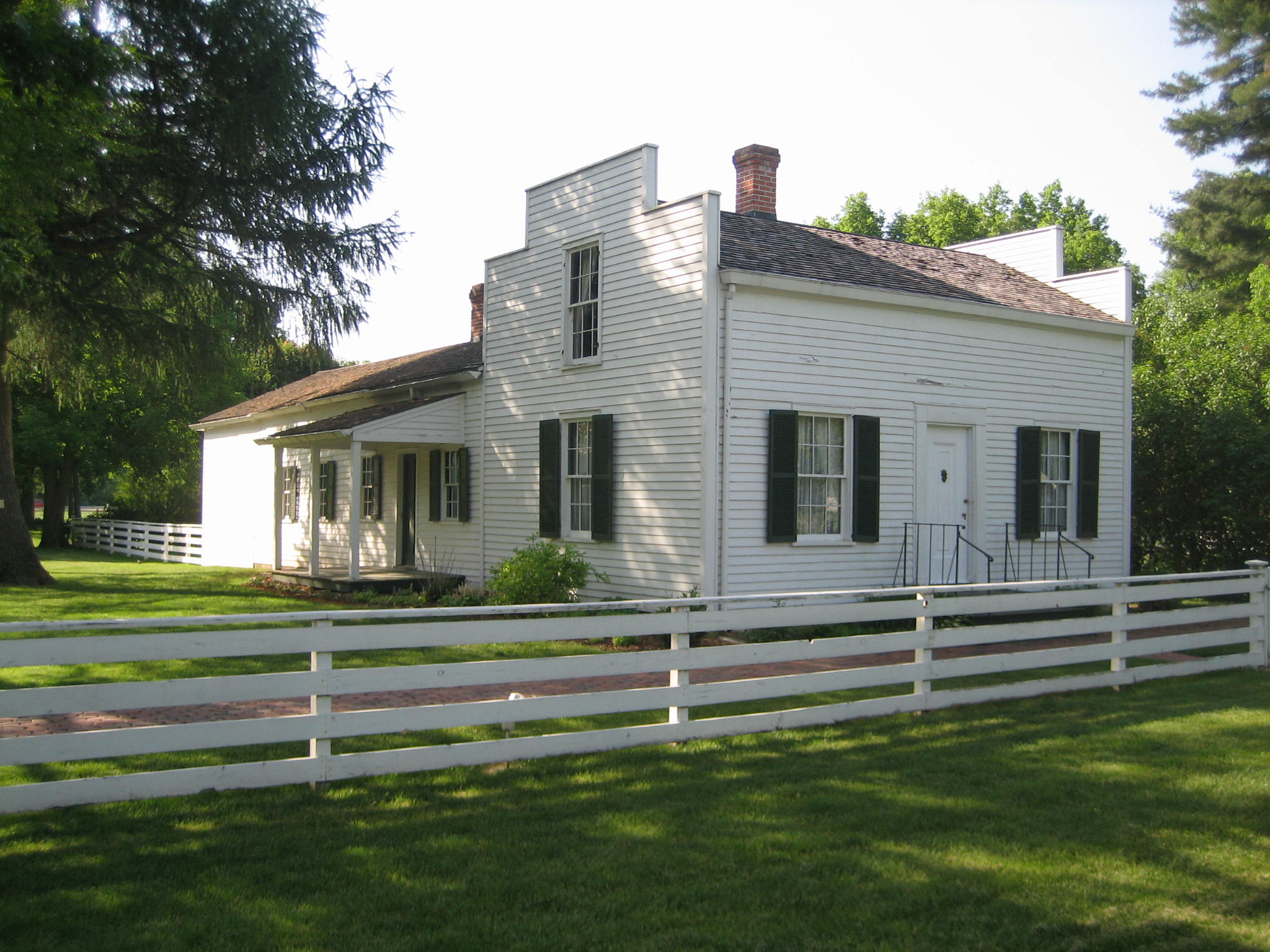
The John Deere House in Grand Detour, Illinois, built 1836

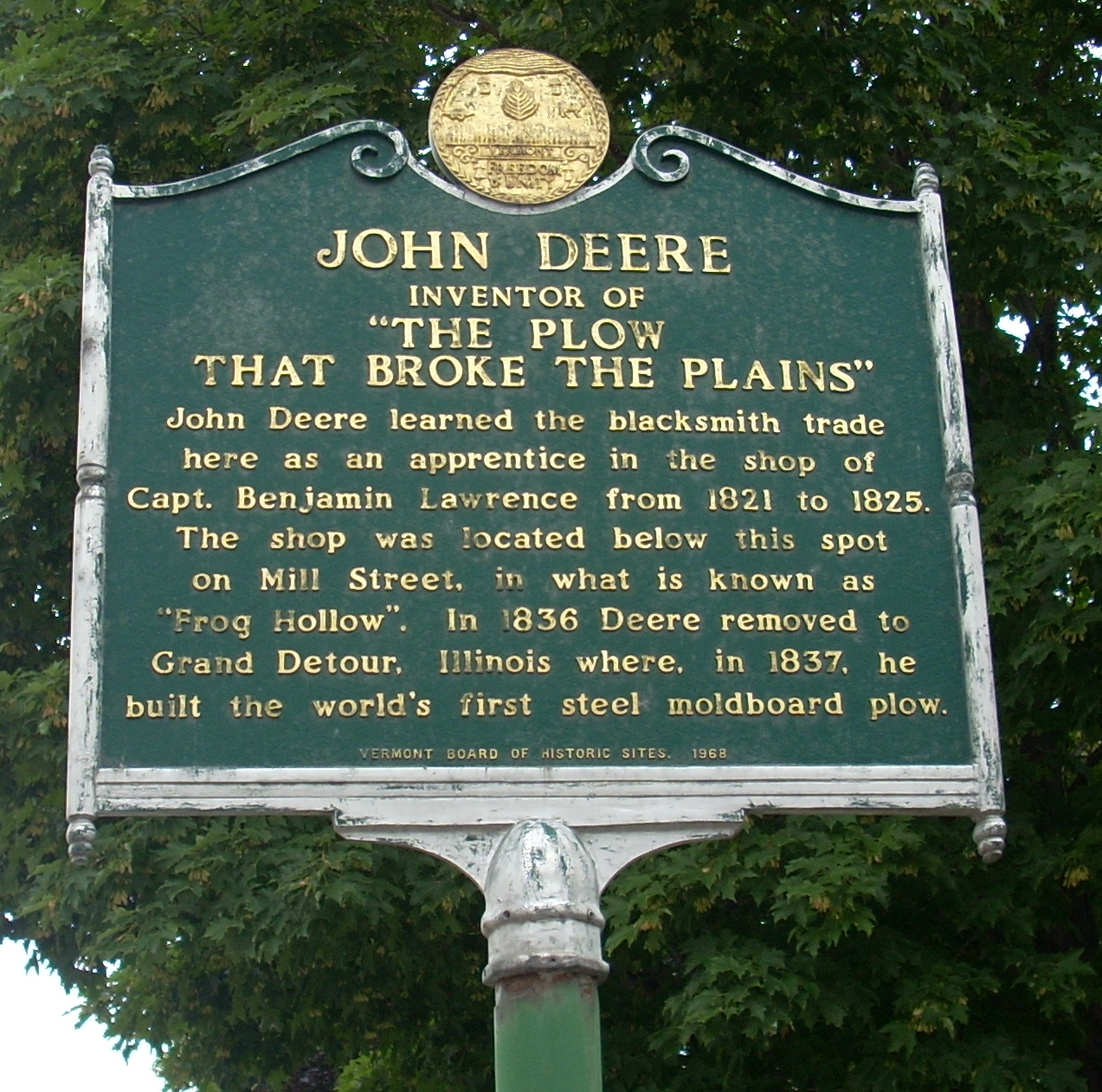
A monument in Middlebury, Vermont marking the shop in the town where Deere learned the blacksmith trade

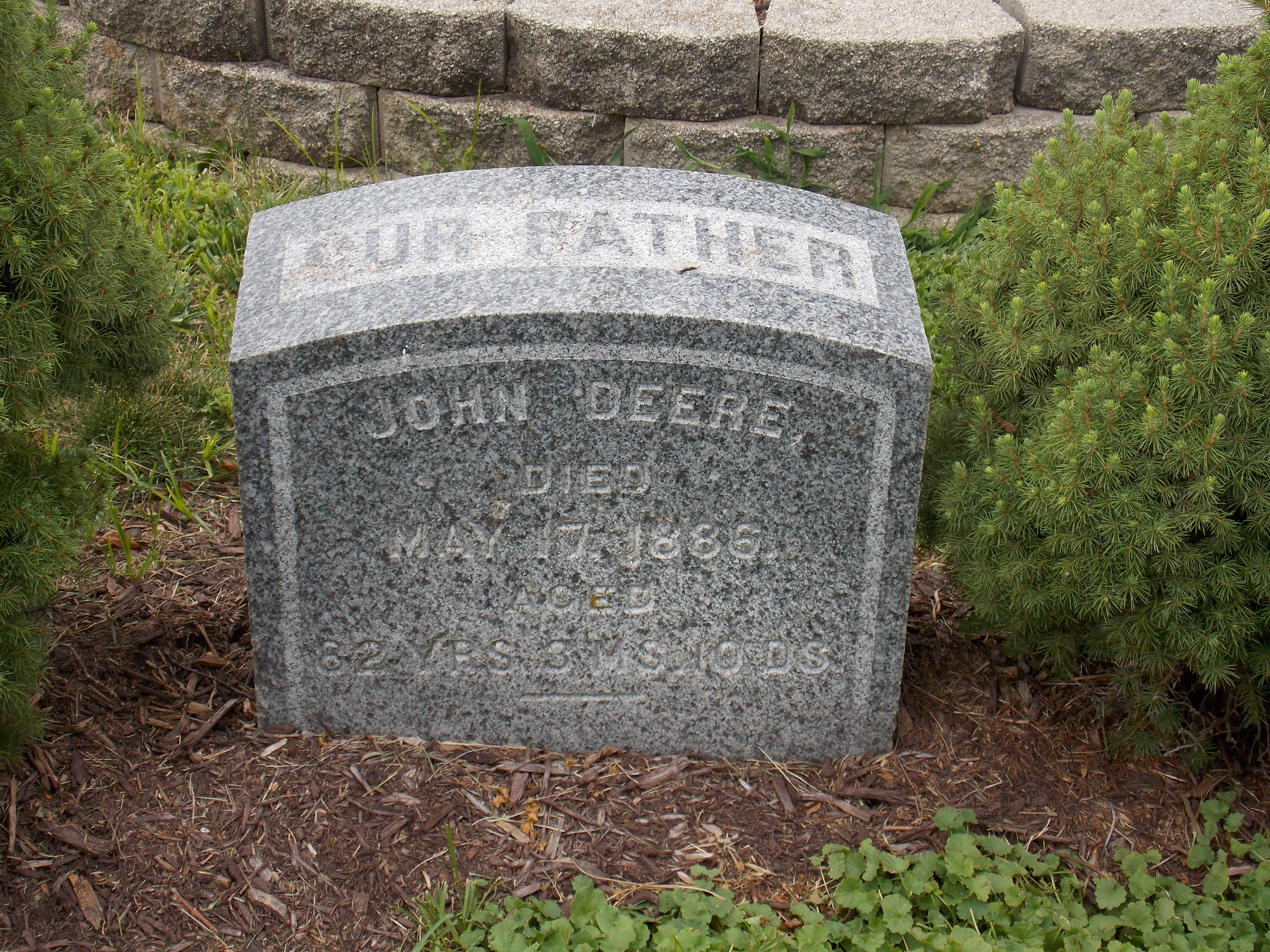
John Deere grave in Riverside Cemetery, Moline
