= Linus Yale =

Linus Yale is the name of:

- Linus Yale, Sr. (1797–1858), American inventor and manufacturer of pin-tumbler locks.
- Linus Yale, Jr. (1821–1868), innovator in cylinder lock technology, son and business partner of the above.
