= Linus Yale Sr. =

American manufacturer of locks (1797–1858)

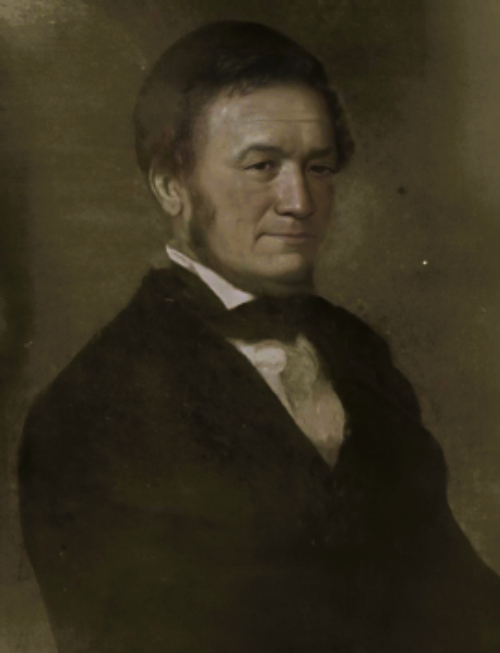
- Born: April 27, 1797; Middletown, Connecticut, U.S.
- Died: August 8, 1858 (aged 61); Newport, New York, U.S.
- Resting place: Newport Cemetery, Newport, Herkimer County, New York, U.S.
- Occupations: Businessman, inventor, metalsmith, politician
- Known for: Multiple patents including pin tumbler locks. Father of Linus Yale Jr
- Children: Linus Yale Jr.
- Relatives: John B. Yale, grandson Julian L. Yale, grandson Merton Yale Cady, grandson Madeline Yale, granddaughter John Deere Cady, great-grandson William Yale Giles, great-great-great-grandson
- Family: Yale

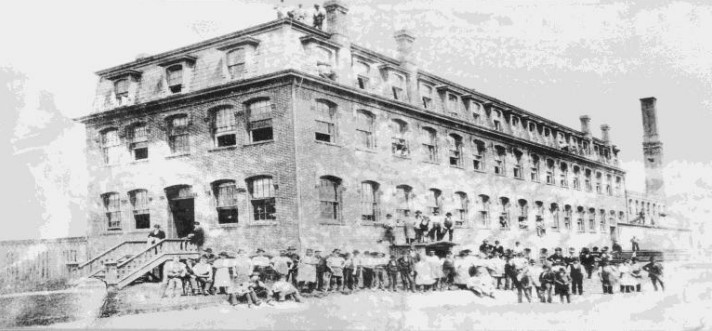
First plant of the Yale Lock Manufacturing Company, started by Linus Yale Jr. and Henry R. Towne

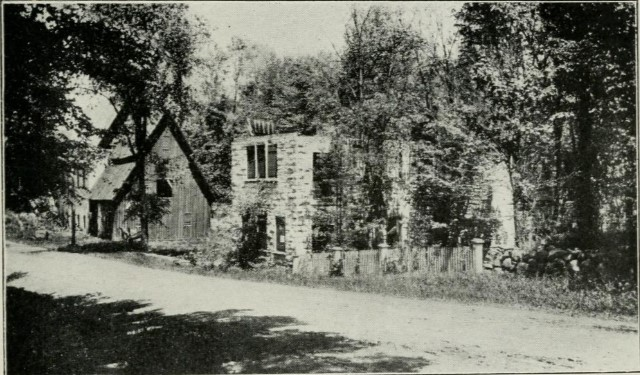
Old Yale Lock Shop, Newport, New York, first location of Linus Sr.'s bank lock shop

Linus Yale (April 27, 1797 – August 8, 1858) was an American businessman, inventor, metalsmith and politician. He was a founder with his son Linus Yale Jr. of the Yale Lock Company, an American manufacturer of bank locks, and served as the first Mayor of Newport, New York. His family were also notable gun-machine makers in Vermont and Massachusetts during the Civil War, supplying Lincoln's Union Army with muskets and interchangeable parts.

Toward the end of his life, Yale's enterprise obtained from the US Treasury Department the contract to become the sole supplier of all the new bank locks, mints, sub-treasuries and custom-houses in the United States.

== Early life ==
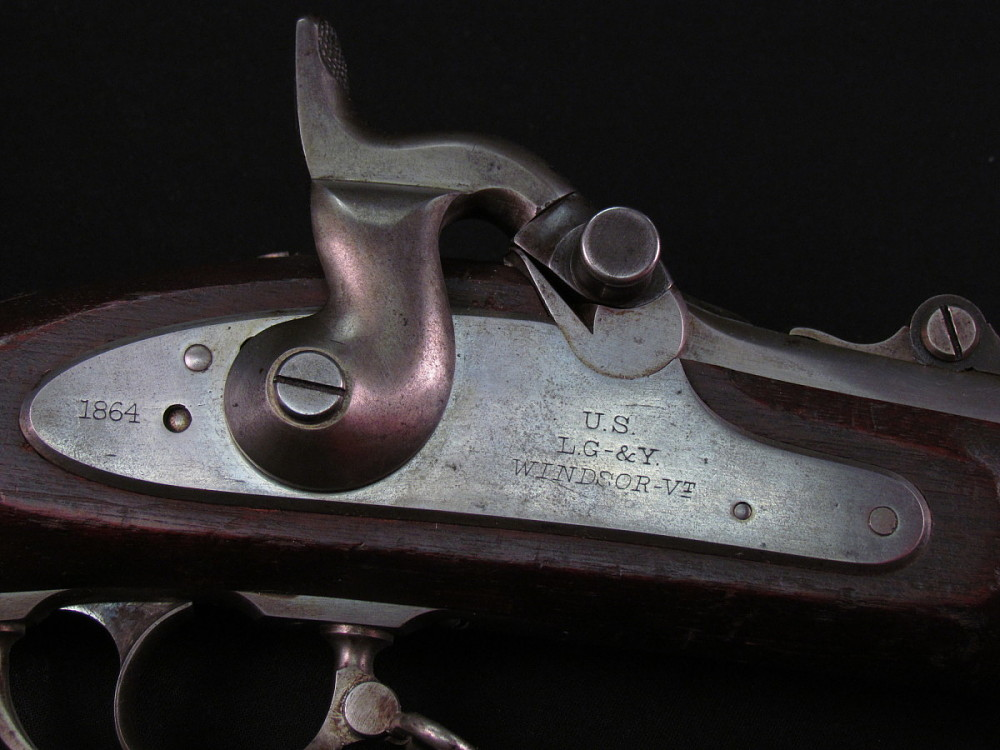
A Springfield Model 1861, built by Lamson, Goodnow & Yale for the Union Army, special government contract with Samuel Colt

Yale was born in Middletown, Connecticut, and later moved with his parents to Salisbury, New York. His parents were Rosetta Bronson and Divan Berry Yale, great-grandnephew of Capt. Theophilus Yale. He married Chlotilda Hopson, September 27, 1815, and they had four children. His brother was Allen Yale and his cousins were Dr. Leroy Milton Yale Jr. and Burrage Yale, who married the daughter of Col. Boardman.

Burrage was a manufacturer of cutlery and machinery with Silas Lamson in 1820, and by the 1850s, they cofounded Lamson, Goodnow & Yale, which evolved into a gun-making machine manufacturer based in Shelburne Falls, Massachusetts, and Windsor, Vermont, with Allen Yale being part of the venture. By 1861, Linus Yale Jr. had moved to Shelburne Falls to start manufacturing bank locks at his factory there with his brother-in-law, Gen. Halbert S. Greenleaf, under Yale & Greenleaf Company.

L. G. & Yale was behind the majority of the weapons manufactured to the Union Army of Abraham Lincoln during the American Civil War, and supplied companies such as the U.S. government, UK government, Springfield Armory, Colt's Manufacturing Company, Remington Arms, Amoskeag Manufacturing Company, and many others.

They were also one of the largest cutlery manufacturers in the U.S during that war, and supplied bayonets and muskets to previous wars, such as the American Revolutionary War, the Mexican-American War and the Crimean War of Napoleon III. Around 1858, they acquired the bankrupt Robbins and Lawrence Armory with Eli Whitney and Samuel Colt, a long time associate, and produced weapons such as the Springfield Model 1861.

Parts were interchangeable with these weapons and with the Colt musket parts. They had received a special government contract from the Lincoln administration for this model, and was accepted by the Senate, under the personal request of Secretary of War Simon Cameron and Edwin Stanton, and with the approval of Joseph Holt, Robert Dale Owen, Peter V. Hagner, and General James Wolfe Ripley.

LG & Yale was one of the companies that shaped the American Civil War itself, as they produced gun-making machinery to supply most of the factories making rifles, carbines, and pistols for the Union Army. Mr. Lamson, fervant abolitionist and head of the company, was one of the ten historical representative American manufacturers of the Civil War period. His home was a station on the Underground Railroad network, hosting many African Americans at his table on their way to Canada.

An exhibition named "Arming the Union" can be seen at the American Precision Museum, where the factory of Lamson, Goodnow & Yale was located.

== Career ==
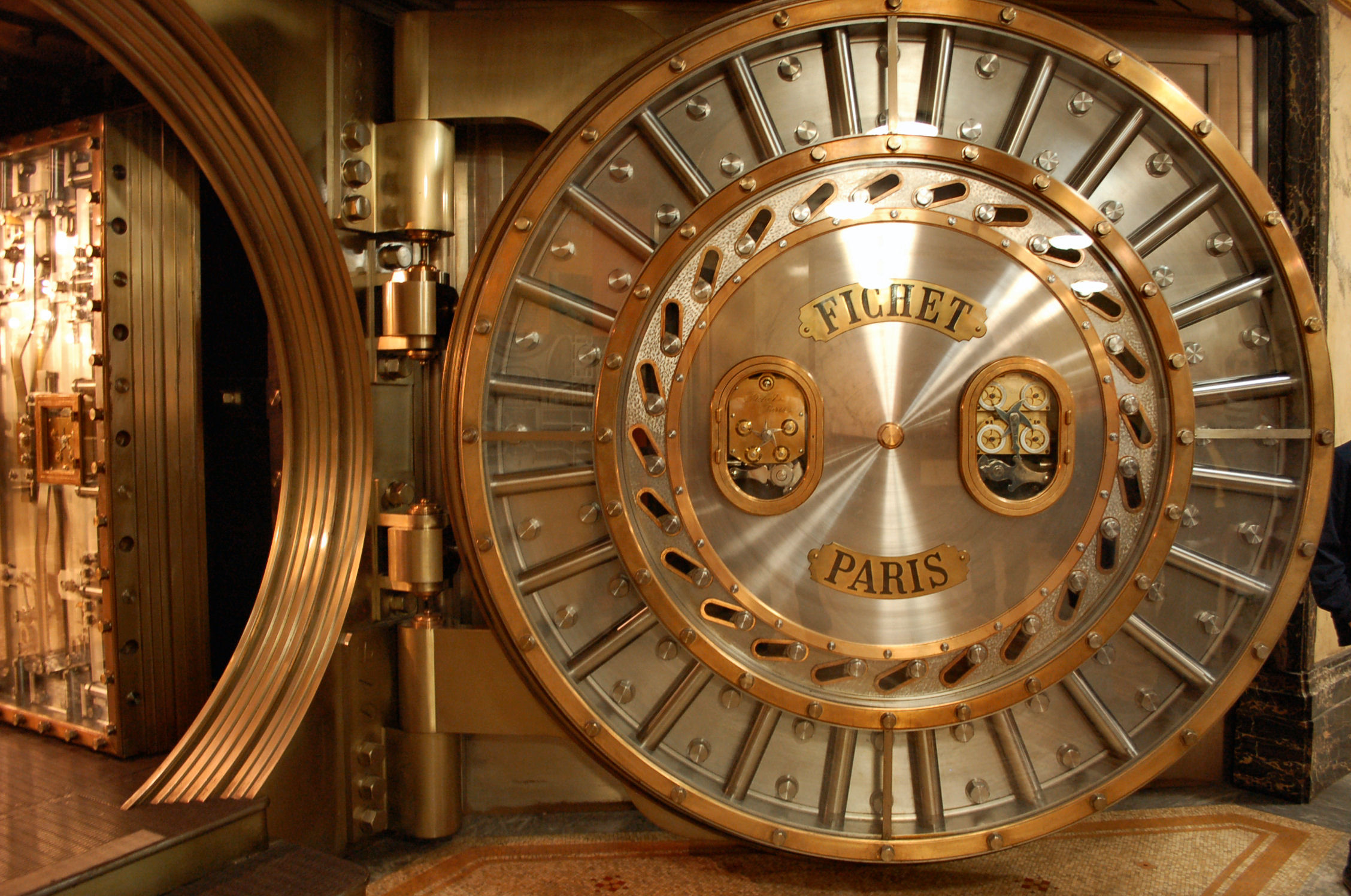
Bank vault, their manufacture will be continued by his son Linus Yale Jr. through the Yale Lock Company

In 1857 the village of Newport, New York, was incorporated and Linus Yale was elected its first President and Mayor. Yale opened a lock shop in the early 1840s in the village of Newport, New York, specializing in bank locks for bank vaults.

In 1850 his son, Linus Yale Jr. joined him at the lock shop and began working on improving his father's pin tumbler lock. Linus Yale Jr. would later found the Yale Lock Company with Henry R. Towne, which would end up becoming the premier lock manufacturer in the United States. They would later add the manufacturing of chain blocks, electric hoists, cranes and testing machines, and become the pioneer of crane builder.

In addition to bank locks, he produced a number of locks for use on doors and drawers.Through his career as an inventor, Linus Yale Sr. registered 14 patents under his name at the United States Patent and Trademark Office, and were signed by the President of the United States Andrew Jackson as early as 1837. These patents included innovations about a threshing machine, sawmill head block, combination lock, pin tumbler safe lock, bank lock, vault and safe door bolt, among others.

The innovations made in the gun-making industry were useful for the door lock industry, as gun locks and door locks were similar in design. After the civil war, the factories stopped manufacturing weapons and started using their capacities to manufacture others products such as sewing machines, bicycles, factory-canned foods, home appliances, and automobiles.

The knowledge gained through the war effort was very useful for the Yale Lock Company as each part of the lock system was designed to allow its manufacture with machine tools, just like the concept of the precise-machine tools of interchangeable parts used by his brother Allen Yale at LG & Yale during the war.

== Family ==
=== Marriage ===
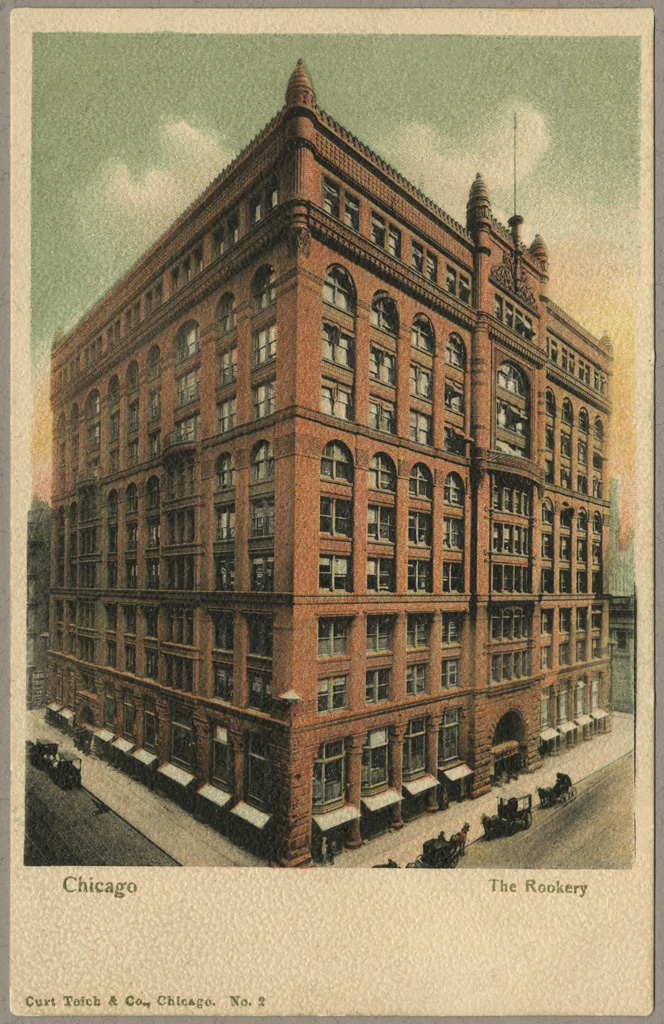
Rookery Building, Chicago, 1888, designed by Frank Lloyd Wright, offices of Julian L. Yale's railway supply business, son of Linus Yale Jr.

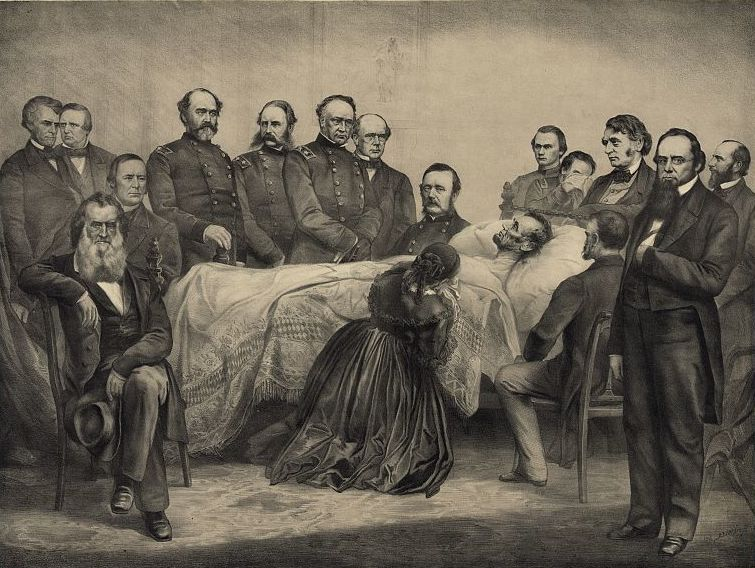
Last moments of Abraham Lincoln, April 15, 1865, John B. Yale's father-in-law, Hugh McCulloch, is at the bed's end on the left, with Mrs. Lincoln, Capt. Lincoln, Salmon P. Chase, surgeon Charles Leale, etc

Linus Yale Sr. married to Catherine Brooks, who was born into a prominent New England family, and was credited for her active work in the abolitionist cause in Philadelphia, where she worked as a teacher at the school of abolitionist architect Theodore Dwight Weld.

She was the daughter of John Brooks, a doctor and member of the Legislature. His grandson was the Governor of Wyoming Bryant Butler Brooks, and his cousin was the Bishop of Massachusetts Phillips Brooks. Catherine's favorite teacher was the famous Ralph Waldo Emerson, who was also from Massachusetts. Her half-sister, Jean Brooks Greenleaf, was married to Congressman Halbert S. Greenleaf, and was elected President of the New York State Women's Suffrage Association.

Around 1850, Linus Sr. built the Yale-Cady Octagon House for the marriage of his daughter Chlothilda to Ira L. Cady. The building is now listed on the National register of Historic Places.

They were the parents of architect Merton Yale Cady, who married to Alice Maria Deere, daughter of John Deere, founder of the John Deere conglomerate. Their granddaughter Jane Mabel Skinner married to Warren Crandall Giles, president of the National League of baseball and the Cincinnati Reds, and were the parents of William Yale Giles, co-proprietor of the Philadelphia Phillies.

=== Grandchildren ===
Just as his son Linus Yale Jr., Linus Sr.'s grandchildren would be part of the Industrial Revolution.

Madeline Yale Wynne became an artist and philanthropist. She married Senator Henry Winn, son of Senator Reuben Winn, and studied at the Art Students League of New York.

John B. Yale joined the Union League of New York, and married to Marie Louise McCulloch, daughter of U.S. Secretary of the Treasury Hugh McCulloch, who played a central role in financing the American Civil War under Abraham Lincoln. He was a millionaire in 1892, and was with President Lincoln the morning he was shot and at his death bed until his last moments.

Julian L. Yale (1848–1909) was the owner and President of Julian L. Yale & Co., a railway supply business from the Railway Exchange Building and the Rookery Building in Chicago. His notable customers were Carnegie Steel, Illinois Steel, Lackawanna Steel, and others. He also became a member of the Union Club and Union Leagues of New York and Chicago.

A great-grandson of Linus Sr. was golfer John Deere Cady, and another member of his family was merchant William Henry Yale, grandson of merchant William Yale. He was in the dry goods business, co-proprietor of Townsend & Yale, one of the oldest and largest commission house in the U.S., with offices on Fifth Avenue, New York, Boston, Chicago, and Philadelphia. The firm was the sole agent of the Boston Manufacturing Company, one of the first factories in America.

William Henry Yale was a Yale graduate, and a member of the Yale Club, Sons of the American Revolution, and the Union League Club of New York. His father, Henry Clay Yale (1829–1897), was also a member of the Union League Club of New York.

== Patents ==
Patents by Linus Yale Sr. from the United States Patent and Trademark Office, signed by the President of the United States, Andrew Jackson:

- January 20, 1830 U.S. patent x5,788 mill stone dresser — Salisbury, New York
- September 17, 1833 U.S. patent x7,767 horse power — Otsego, New York (with P.C. Curtis)
- September 17, 1833 U.S. patent x7,770 threshing machine — Utica, New York (with P.C. Curtis)
- September 11, 1835 U.S. patent 9,094x sawmill head block — Utica, New York
- May 17, 1838 U.S. patent 739 grain threshing machine — Little Falls, New York (with S.W. Stimson)
- July 29, 1841 U.S. patent 2,196 sawmill dog — Newport, New York
- October 20, 1843 U.S. patent 3,312 combination lock — Springfield, Massachusetts (with C. Wilson)
- June 13, 1844 U.S. patent 3,630 pin tumbler safe lock — Springfield, Massachusetts
- February 13, 1849 U.S. patent 6,111 safe — Newport, New York
- October 18, 1853 U.S. patent 10,144 a bank lock — Newport, New York
- February 28, 1854 U.S. patent 10,584a bank lock — Newport, New York
- May 22, 1855 U.S. patent 12,932 a bank lock — Newport, New York
- August 5, 1856 U.S. patent 15,500 vault and safe door bolt — Newport, New York
- September 8, 1857 U.S. patent 18,169 padlock — Newport, New York

== See also ==
- Linus Yale Jr.
- Yale-Cady Octagon House and Yale Lock Factory Site
- Yale

== Sources ==
- Yale, Elihu. The Yale Family. New Haven, Connecticut: Storer & Storer, 1850. LCCN: 09-18747
- Yale, Rodney Horace. Yale Genealogy and History of Wales. Beatrice, Nebraska: Milburn and Scott Co., 1908. LCCN: 09-9945
