= Julian L. Yale =

Railroad entrepreneur from Chicago

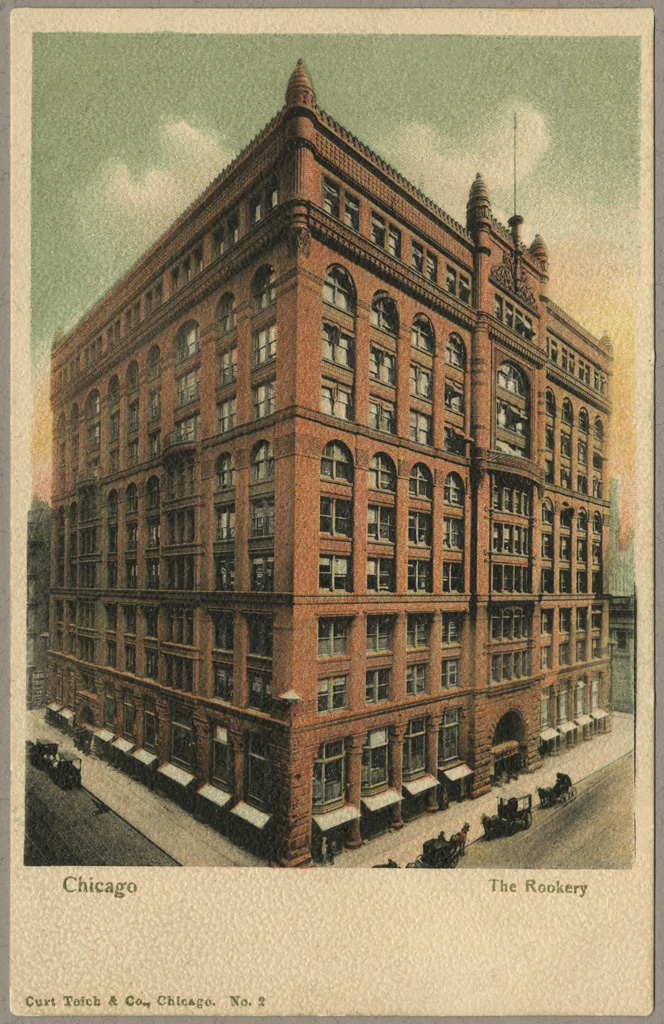
The Rookery Building, Chicago, 1898, headquarters of Julian L. Yale & Co., architect Frank Lloyd Wright worked on the project at the time

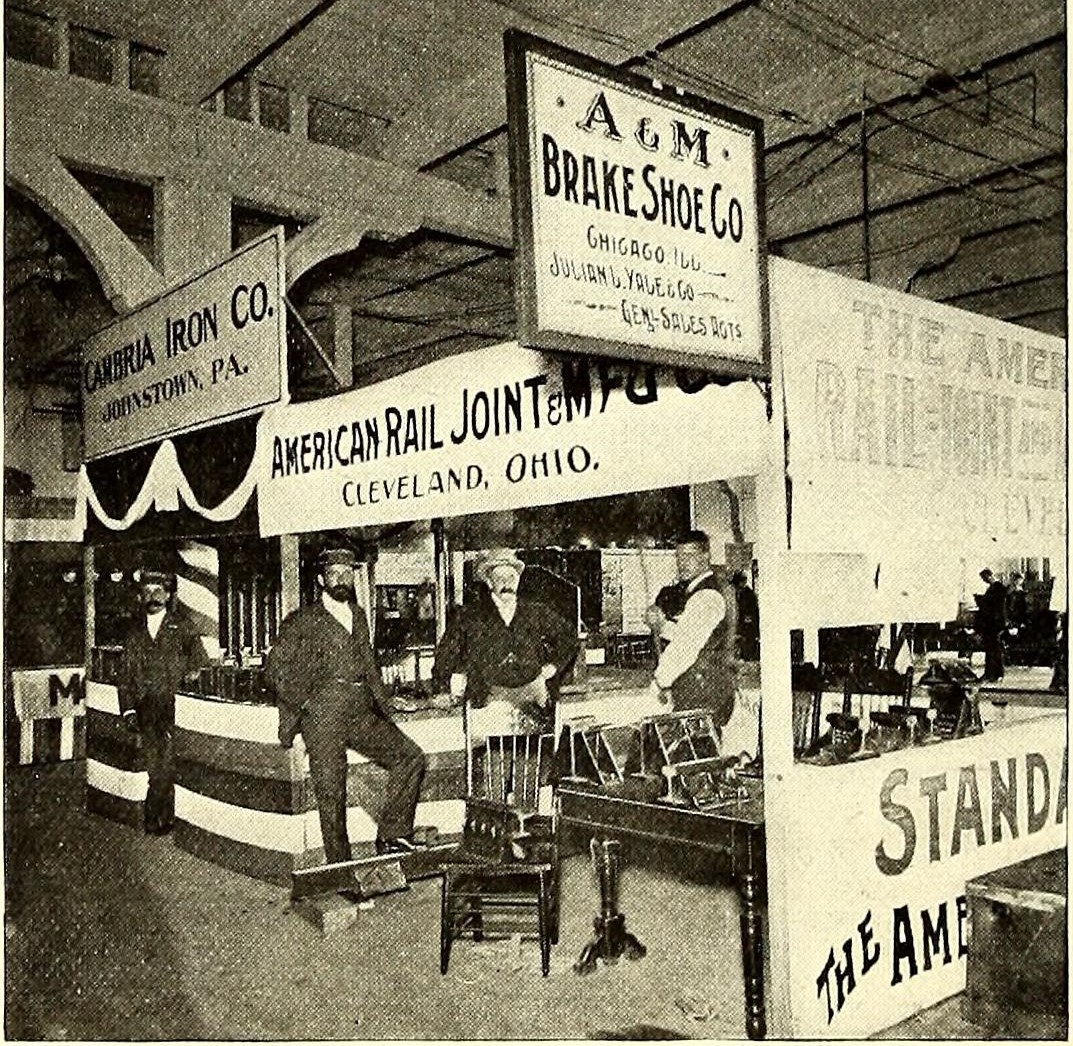
Exposition of Julian L. Yale's business named Julian L. Yale & Co. in Chicago

Julian Linus Yale (1850 – 1909) was an American railroad entrepreneur and president of Julian L. Yale & Co., later sold to Samuel P. Bush's company. He was Carnegie Steel's representative for their railway business, and purchasing representative of the Big Four for the Vanderbilts. He was also the son of Yale Lock inventor Linus Yale Jr., and a member of the Union League Club of New York.

Notably, he introduced the Shelby Steel Tube technology to the railway market, helping the growth of a new industry in America. He also founded an electric vehicle company in 1907, dealing in electric cars and other vehicles such as the Baker Motor Vehicle.

== Biography ==
Julian L. Yale was born on March 26, 1850, in Newport, New York to Linus Yale Jr., son of Linus Yale Sr., inventor and mayor of Newport. They were members of the Yale family who gave their name to Yale College. His cousin was architect Merton Yale Cady, and his uncle and aunt were Congressman Halbert S. Greenleaf and suffragist Jean Brooks Greenleaf. He was involved in his family enterprise, the Yale Lock Company, for number of years, while his brother, John B. Yale, would become its Treasurer. He worked with his father at the company's beginnings, receiving his training, and was involved with its first locks.

While initially starting his career in New York on the commercial side of the Yale Lock Co., working with various companies, he moved to the West, and worked in the railroad industry. He became the purchasing agent of the Cincinnati, Hamilton and Dayton Railway, Cincinnati and Richmond Railroad, and the Cleveland, Columbus, Cincinnati & Indianapolis, now part of the Cleveland, Cincinnati, Chicago & St. Louis, also known as the Big Four. The enterprise was at the time one of the railroads controlled by the Vanderbilt family. In 1883, Yale is recorded among the general officers of the Cincinnati and Springfield Railway, as their purchasing agent, along with board directors William H. Vanderbilt, Cornelius Vanderbilt II, financier William Bayard Cutting, Democratic chairman Augustus Schell and Congressman Amos Townsend. They were the Vanderbilts of the Triple Palace in New York and The Breakers in Newport.

Yale then founded with his brother, John B. Yale, and a few others, the Bankers and Merchants Telegraph Company, which would construct, maintain, and operate telegraph lines from Cleveland to Cincinnati, Toledo and others places in Ohio. The company had a capital stock of $3,000,000 in 1884, with his brother as its Secretary-Treasurer. In the same year, he is recorded as the purchasing agent of the Dayton and Union Railroad and the Indianapolis and St. Louis Railroad, at the time under president John H. Devereux. Devereux was a general and railroad builder during the American Civil War, business partner of John D. Rockefeller and Henry Flagler, and was also in charge of hosting the Grand Duke Alexei of Russia, son of Tsar Alexander II, during his official visit to Cleveland.

Yale then moved into the railway supply business at Cleveland, Ohio, and became one of Cleveland's prominent iron manufacturers with H. H. Brown. He represented the Carnegie Steel Co. of Andrew Carnegie for their railway supply business and became General Sales Agent for about 10 years of the Illinois Steel Company, the largest steel producer in the United States. He rose to that position at the incorporation of the company, having served under the various enterprises that were merged before the formation of the conglomerate.

A few years after Yale's departure, the company president Elbert Henry Gary worked with J.P. Morgan to acquire Carnegie Steel, and formed United States Steel Corporation, the first company with a 1 billion dollars market capitalization. The Illinois Steel Co., Yale's future customer, was in the business of the manufacture of Bessemer steel rails, iron and steel merchant bar, rail fastenings, light "T" and street rails, steel billets, wire rods, iron and steel car truck channels, steel "I" beams and structural shapes, with their New York office at 46 Wall Street. In 1896, he became a member of the Bessemer Steel Association at Hotel Manhattan, representing Illinois Steel Co., with various members of Carnegie Steel Co. and other manufacturers, and a year later, he became a member of the reception committee of the National Business League, with president Ferdinand Peck, mayor Carter Harrison Sr., Gen. John R. Brooke, and a few others.

== Later career ==
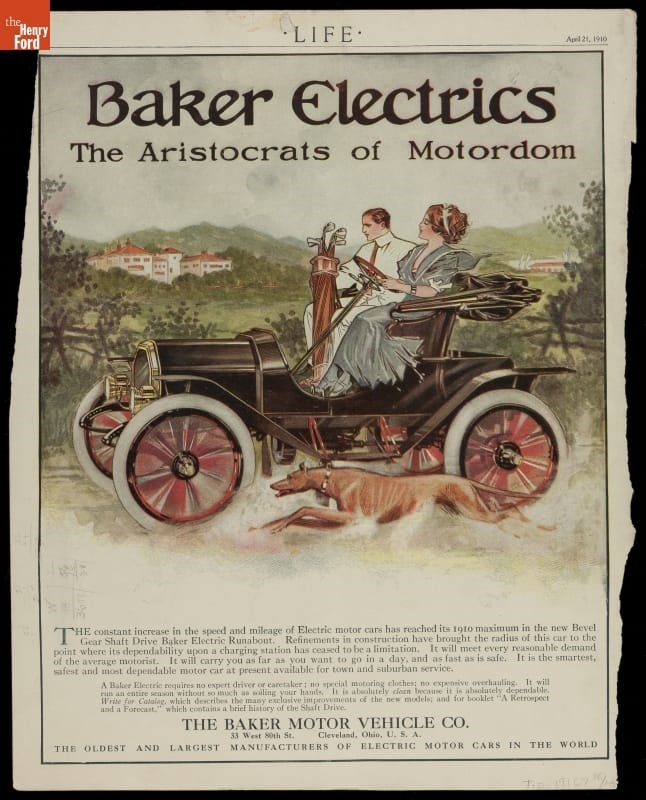
Advertisement of the main company of Cleveland, Baker-electrics, in 1910, named the Aristocrats of Motordom

After resigning from his position as General Sales Agent of the Illinois Steel Co. around 1897, he launched a partnership in the railroad supply business with chief chemist Townsend. V. Church, member of the American Institute of Mining Engineers. They were also involved in the general iron and steel business, and started operating from the newly built Rookery Building in Chicago, partly designed by architect Frank Lloyd Wright. Their customers would be Carnegie Steel, Illinois Steel, Lackawanna Steel, among many others. They also founded Julian L. & Co, railway suppliers, and later operated from the Railway Exchange Building, also in Chicago.

Yale introduced the Shelby Steel tube innovation to the railway market in America, which helped launch the steel tubing manufacturing industry in the country, taking market shares away from the British. At a railroad industry exhibition, they representend, as selling agents, the Allen & Morrison Brake Shoe & Manufacturing Company, and the American Rail Joint & Manufacturing Company. He then became the representative of the Lackawanna Steel Company of New York, the second-largest steel producer in the country. Julian L. Yale & Co. was the West and Northwestern States selling agent of the American Rail Joint & Manufacting Co., whose company obtained at the exhibition the contract for supplying the badges of the entire NYC Police force of the New York metropolitan area, made of metal, aluminium, brass, silver, etc. A sample of the badges used by the New York police force was also shown.

In 1899, he cofounded the Clarendon Mining Company, an enterprise with a capital stock of $500,000 in Leadville, Colorado, with Congressman and Mayor George W. Cook, Senator William Grover Smith and Col. Joseph J. Slocum, a brother-in-law of millionaire Russell Sage, the cousin of Col. Ira Yale Sage. In 1900, Yale is recorded as the vice-president of the American Mckenna Process Company, a rail manufacturer with offices and plants in Illinois, Boston, and New Jersey. During about this time, his brother John. B. Yale and president Henry R. Towne were serving the railroad industry though the Yale Lock Company, manufacturing travelling locomotive, jib, pillar, and other cranes, trolleys, tram-rails, and other items. From another branch of the Yales, Gov. William H. Yale of Minnesota, became a board director of the Winona and Southwestern Railway Company.

Julien L. Yale & Co. is later selling renews rails, freight passengers, engine and tender couples, iron car roots, steam shovels, wrecking cars, victor rivers, soiler tubes, and equipment from the Buckeye Steel Castings Co. They also became Buckeye's representatives in Chicago. In 1907, he cofounded the Baker Electric Vehicle Company of Chicago, dealing in electric cars and other vehicles such as the Baker Motor Vehicles. These electric vehicles were built in Cleveland at the time, with Thomas Edison as one of the customers of the main company. One of Yale's electric cars would be involved in a car crash in 1909 by one of his chauffeurs.

== Personal life ==
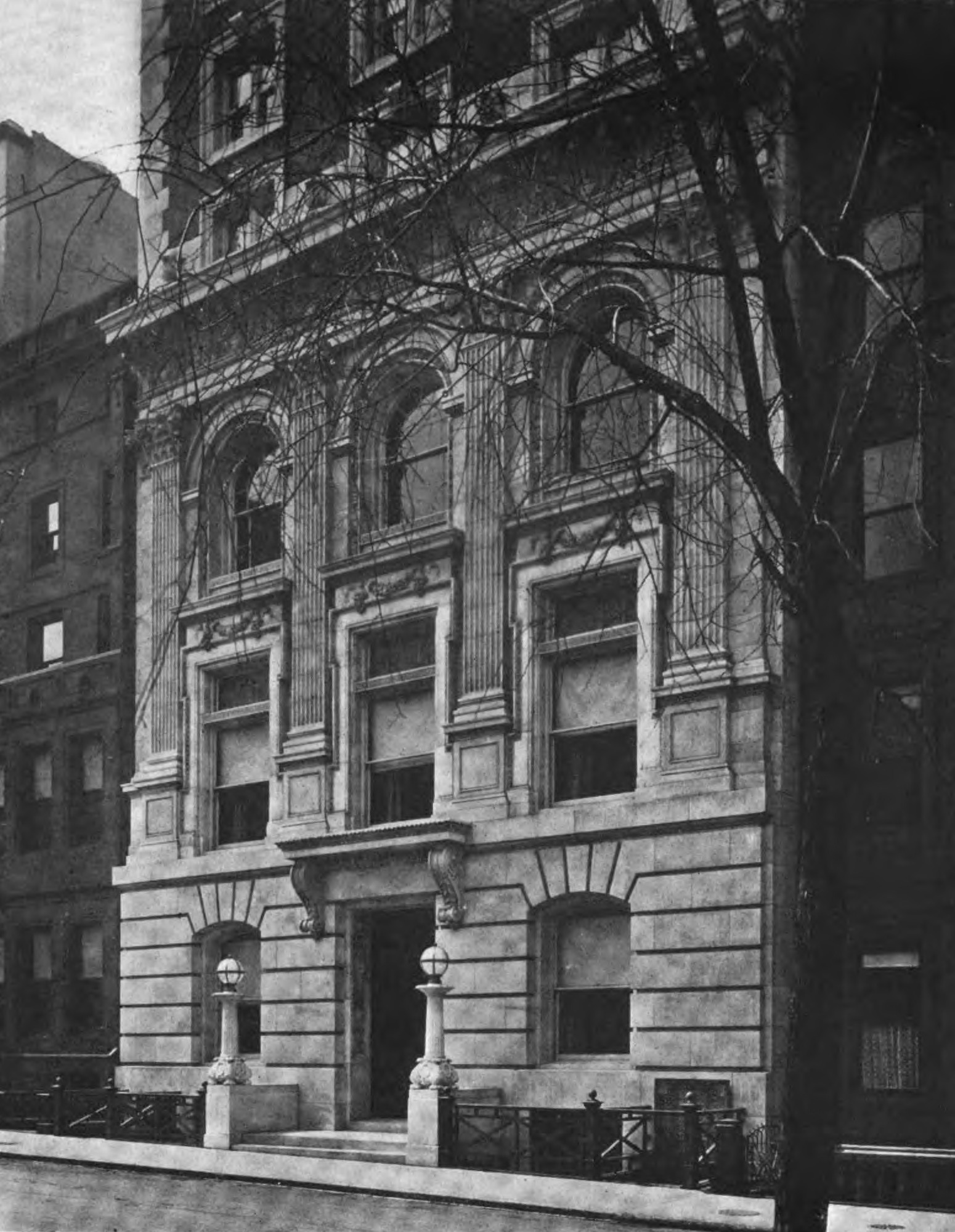
Engineers'Club, Manhattan, Julian L. Yale was a member in 1891 along with Andrew Carnegie, one of its benefactors

Yale was a member of the Blue Book and Social Register of Chicago, and was recorded living at 9 Ritchie Court with his sister Madeline Yale Wynne, wife of Senator Henry Winn. His other brother-in-law was Charles McCulloch, President of the Hamilton National Bank, and son of the U.S. Treasury Secretary of Abraham Lincoln, millionaire Hugh McCulloch of Fort Wayne. Yale was also the uncle of architect Merton Yale Cady, who married the daughter of John Deere, founder of the John Deere Company. His nephews were MIT engineer Philip Henry Wynne and Harvard doctor Sidney Yale Wynne.

Yale was a member of the Engineers' Club of New York in 1891, along with Andrew Carnegie, Henry R. Towne of the Yale Lock Co., Eli Whitney, Charles Campbell Worthington, Gov. Hobart B. Bigelow, and many others. The club was funded in part by Carnegie. During his lifetime, Yale also became a member of the Union League Club of New York, the Union League Club of Chicago, the Chicago Club, the Chicago Athletic Association, the Cliff Dwellers Club, the Union Club and the St. Louis Club.

Julian L. Yale died of apoplexy on March 3, 1909, at his home in Chicago, without children.

After his death, Julian L. Yale & Co. was sold to Buckeye Steel Castings Co., under president Samuel P. Bush, patriarch of U.S. presidents George W. Bush and George H. W. Bush, and board director Frank Rockefeller, brother of John D. Rockefeller.

Buckeye Steel was previously under the control of the Rockefellers and railroad baron E. H. Harriman, cousin of Anne Harriman Vanderbilt, mother-in-law of Prince Charles M. Joachim Napoléon. The company opened an office in Yale's former offices in the Railway Exchange Building, and put in charge Charles B. Goodspeed and engineer Frank Miller, a former employee. Director Goodspeed would later be one of the National Finance Committeemen for the Republicans under Chairman Henry P. Fletcher, along with U.S. Navy Secretary Charles Francis Adams III and Standard Oil Chairman Herbert Lee Pratt.
