= Jean Brooks Greenleaf =

American woman suffragist (1832–1918)

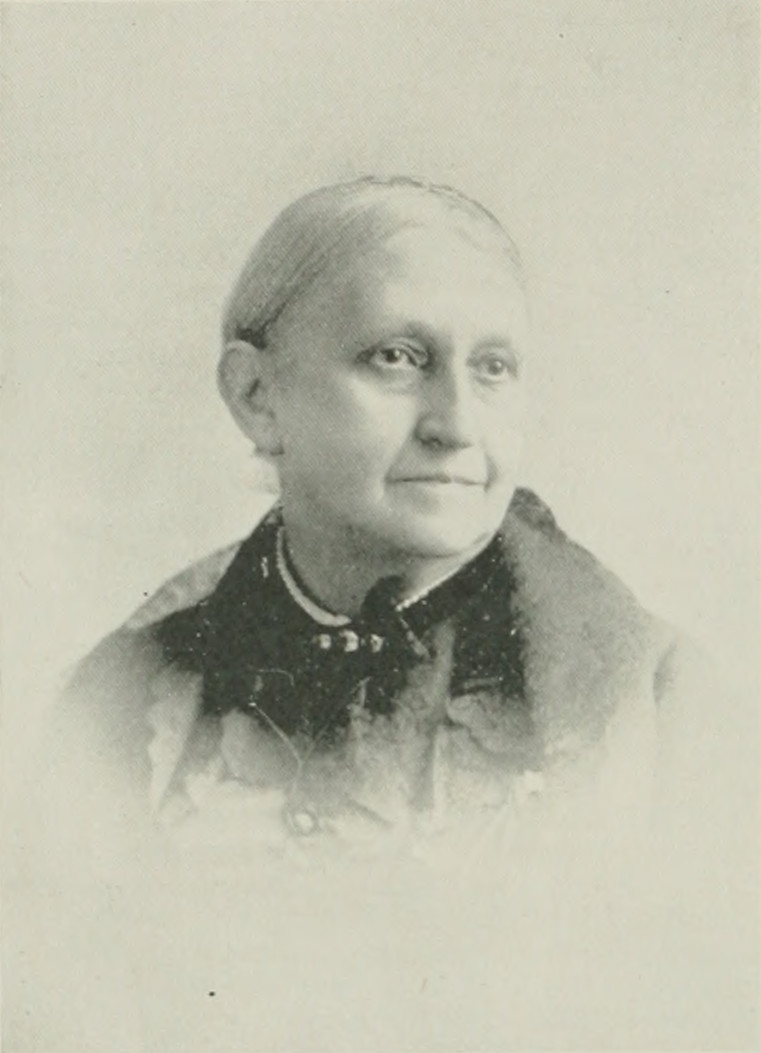
Jean Brooks Greenleaf, "A Woman of the Century"

Jean Brooks Greenleaf (October 1, 1831 – March 2, 1918) was an American woman suffragist. With her death in 1918, there passed the last of a small group of devoted suffragists who received their first inspiration from Susan B. and Mary Anthony. Greenleaf was the only one of three women who saw their goal come true in New York, the state where they had lived the greater share of their lives.

== Early life and education ==
Jean (nickname, "Jeannie" or Jane) F. Brooks was born in Bernardston, Massachusetts, October 1, 1832. She was the daughter of John Brooks, M.D. (1783-1866), and his second wife Mary Amelia nee Bascom Brooks (1796-1862). Her half-sister was Catherine Brooks, wife of Linus Yale Jr. of the Yale family. Her nephews were Julian L. Yale and John B. Yale. Dr. Brooks was a man of decided opinions, a liberal in both religion and politics, and had the courage of his convictions. His ideas were advanced, for his time, with regard to the training of his daughters for lives of usefulness and independence, and the cultivation of a habit of independent thought on matters of vital interest. Mrs. Brooks was domestic in her taste, caring well for her household, and, although disabled, actively involved in alleviating the wants of those less fortunate in life than herself. Greenleaf was the youngest of seven children.

Greenleaf's school life was limited to a few years in the public schools and academy of her native village, supplemented by two terms in Melrose Seminary, in West Brattleboro, Vermont. At the age of seventeen, the mother's disability necessitated the ending of school life, and from that time until her marriage, three years later, she assumed largely the duties of her father's household. Her interests in the rights and wrongs of woman was awakened early on while listening to the spirited remonstrance of a widowed aunt, Mrs. Willard, against paying taxes upon property that she had acquired by her own exertions, when she had no representation at the polls, while a miserable drunkard in the neighborhood, who was supported by his wife and daughters, and who owned no property, was allowed to vote in opposition to what both she and the wife and daughters of the drunkard believed to be for the best interests of the community.

== Career ==
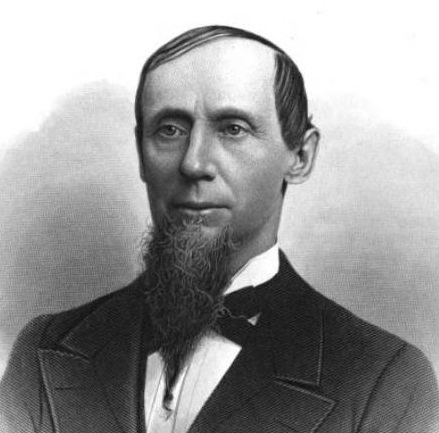
Halbert S. Greenleaf

She married Halbert S. Greenleaf in 1852. Her husband joined the Union Army in 1862, and commanded the 52nd Massachusetts Volunteers in the civil war on the side of the Union. He was in full sympathy with his wife in her views respecting the enfranchisement of women. The changes brought about by the civil war made a residence in Louisiana necessary for a few years, but the couple moved to Rochester, New York in 1867, and remained there, with the exception of time spent in Washington, D.C. when Mr. Greenleaf served as a member of Congress. He had been one of the directors of the Sargent & Greenleaf Company since its incorporation, and served as a trustee of St. Lawrence University for some years.

Greenleaf was a strong supporter of the cause of woman suffrage. For its sake, she was ready and happy to make all needful sacrifice. She was one of the first members of and served as president of the Woman's Political Club of Rochester, before becoming its honorary president for twenty years. In December, 1890, she was elected to succeed Lillie Devereux Blake as the president of the New York State Woman's Suffrage Association, and held the position till 1896. It was under her leadership that the petition was presented to the state constitutional convention in 1894. In 1893, Greenleaf was a Democratic candidate for delegate to that convention, and polled a large vote. At the state suffrage convention of November 1896, held in Rochester, Greenleaf felt obliged to decline a re-election and Mariana Wright Chapman was unanimously chosen for her place, while Greenleaf was appointed fraternal delegate to the annual meeting of the State Grange.

== Death and legacy ==
She died at her home, March 2, 1918, and was buried at Rochester's, Mount Hope Cemetery. With many bequests in her will, a large number of persons shared in Greenleaf's estate.
