= Halbert S. Greenleaf =

American politician

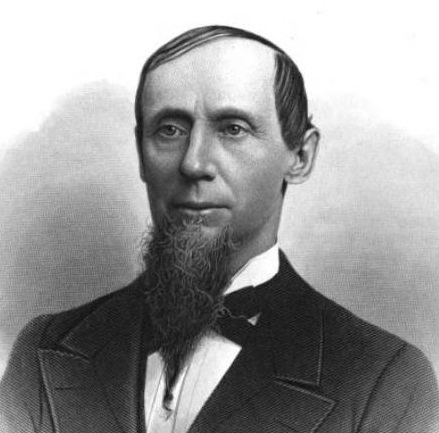
Halbert S. Greenleaf, Congressman from New York

General Halbert Stevens Greenleaf (April 12, 1827 – August 25, 1906) was an American Civil War military officer, Congressman, and manufacturer from Massachusetts. He became Brigadier General of the First New York Veteran Brigade.

== Biography ==
Born in Guilford, Vermont, Greenleaf attended the common schools and completed an academic course. He moved to Shelburne Falls, Massachusetts, and engaged in the manufacture of locks. He was appointed Justice of the Peace in 1856 by the Governor of Massachusetts. He served as captain of Massachusetts Militia in 1857, and in 1861, he cofounded with Linus Yale Jr., the Yale & Greenleaf Lock Company during the American Civil War in Shelburne Falls, Massachusetts.

=== Civil War ===
Enlisted as a private in the Union Army in August 1862. Commissioned captain of Company E, Fifty-second Regiment, Massachusetts Volunteers, September 12, 1862.

Greenleaf was elected Colonel and Commandant of the 52nd Massachusetts Infantry Regiment October 23, 1862. This regiment was one of the 18 state regiment formed in response to Abraham Lincoln's call. His superior was Major General Nathaniel P. Banks, one of the political major generals appointed by President Lincoln. Col. Greenleaf and his regiment was sent to Louisiana and fought on the flank at the Battle of Fort Bisland, and other battles.

== After the war ==
After the war, he was given the command of the government steamer named Col. Benedict, on the lower Mississippi, and he was employed in a salt works near New Orleans, Louisiana, for several years. He settled in Rochester, New York, in 1867 and resumed the manufacture of locks.

In the presidential campaign of 1880 Col. Greenleaf devoted himself to support of General Hancock as the Democratic candidate, and organized and commanded the "Hancock Brigade". The brigade was a political military organization opposed to the Republicans. His firm Sargent & Greenleaf manufacture had patents for magnetic, automatic, chronometer, and other burglar locks; combination safe locks, padlocks, drawer, trunk, house, chest, store, door, and other locks, and night-latches.

In 1882, he was given the Command of the First New York Veteran Brigade and received the rank of Brigadier General.

He was also a member of the board of trustees of the Rochester Savings Bank, the Rochester park commission, St. Lawrence University at Canton, N. Y., and of the Soldiers' and Sailors' Home at Bath, N. Y

== Congress ==
Greenleaf was elected as a Democrat to the Forty-eighth Congress (March 4, 1883 – March 3, 1885). He was an unsuccessful candidate for reelection in 1884 to the Forty-ninth Congress.

Greenleaf was elected to the 52nd United States Congress (March 4, 1891 – March 3, 1893). He was not a candidate for renomination in 1892.

=== Later career and death ===
He resumed his former business activities until retirement in 1896. He died at his summer home in the town of Greece, near Charlotte, New York, on August 25, 1906. He and his wife Jean Brooks Greenleaf, a noted suffragist, were interred in Mount Hope Cemetery, Rochester, New York.

He was the brother-in-law of Linus Yale Jr. of the Yale Lock Company, who was married to his wife's half sister. His nephews were Julian L. Yale and John B. Yale.

U.S. House of Representatives
Preceded by John Van Voorhis	Member of the U.S. House of Representatives from New York's 30th congressional district 1883–1885	Succeeded by Charles S. Baker
Preceded by Charles S. Baker	Member of the U.S. House of Representatives from New York's 30th congressional district 1891–1893	Succeeded by James W. Wadsworth, Sr.
