= John B. Yale =

Telegraph and railroad entrepreneur from New York

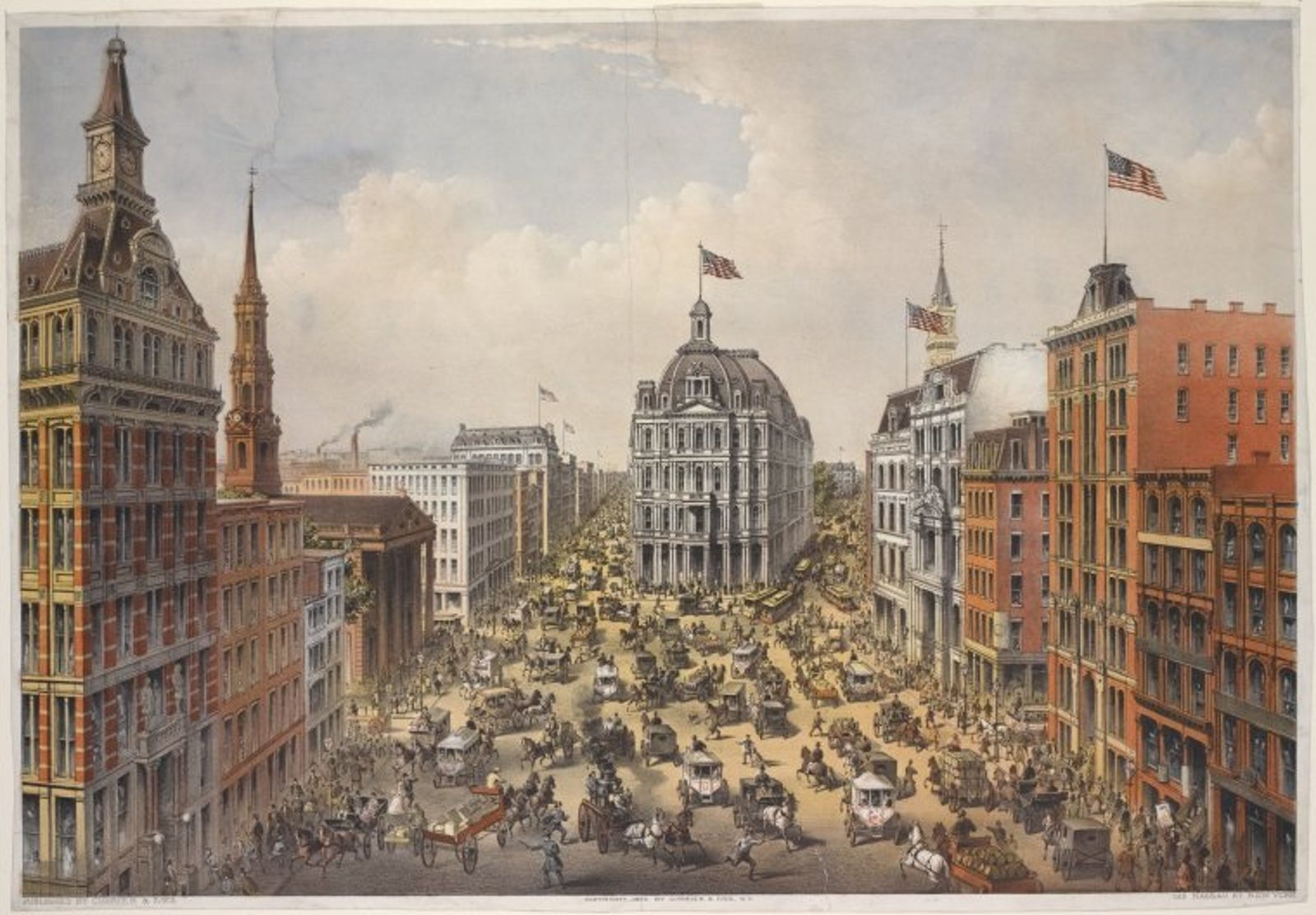
An 1875 illustration of Broadway in Manhattan, where Yale's Bankers and Merchants Telegraph Co.'s office is visible on the left next to the Western Union Telegraph Building

John Brooks Yale (October 26, 1845 – August 28, 1904) was an American telegraph and railroad entrepreneur, treasurer of the Yale Lock Company. He was an early founder and secretary-treasurer of the Bankers and Merchants Telegraph Company, competing against financier Jay Gould, the robber baron of the Western Union. They operated over 400 offices, and controlled about 100,000 miles of wiring across the country, including lines of the Chicago Board of Trade and the New York Stock Exchange.

Yale's company would be bankrupted by Gould's schemes, and be acquired by industrialist John W. Mackay, one of the Bonanza Kings, and be merged with the Postcal Telegraph Co.. Yale was also the son of Yale lock inventor Linus Yale Jr., and the son-in-law of millionaire Hugh McCulloch, the last U.S. Treasury Secretary of Abraham Lincoln.

== Early life and education ==
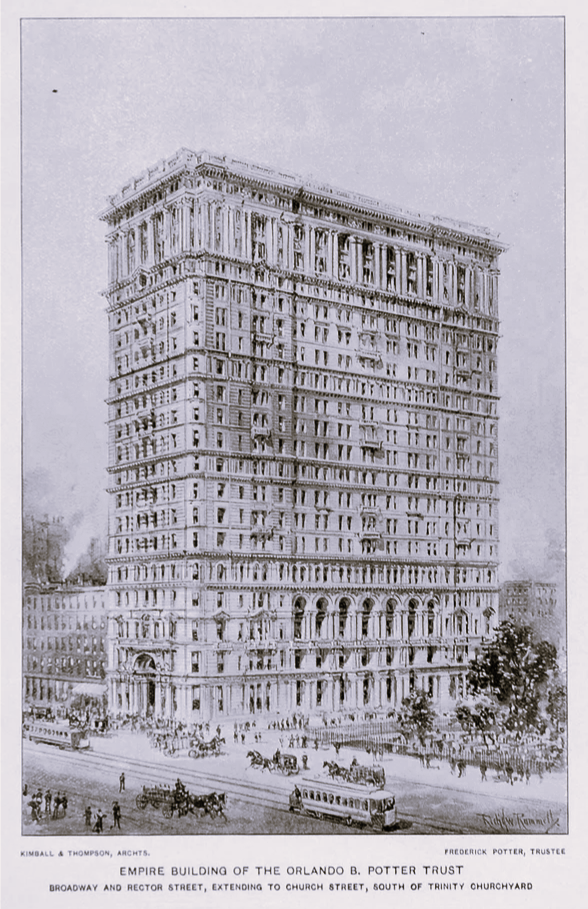
The Empire Building in Manhattan, the seat of the Illinois Steel Company, where Yale was their New York representative

Yale was born on October 26, 1845, in Newport, New York, to Linus Yale Jr. and Catherine Brooks, members of the Yale family. He was the brother of railroad entrepreneur Julian L. Yale, and craft artist Madeline Yale Wynne, who married to Senator Henry Winn. His uncle was Congressman and General Halbert S. Greenleaf, and his cousin, architect Merton Yale Cady, was the son-in-law of John Deere. Yale was also the cousin of Gov. Bryant Butler Brooks, and his mother was an abolitionist teacher, cousin of Bishop Phillips Brooks.

Yale was educated at Eagleswood Military Academy in Perth Amboy, New Jersey. He didn't attend college and started working early on in the steel industry. Yale was an expert mechanic, and was connected with number of steel and iron corporations. For number of years, he was the New York agent of the largest steel producer in the country, the Illinois Steel Company, seated at the Empire Building, an enterprise that would later acquire Carnegie Steel with J.P. Morgan to form US Steel.

He was also assistant sales agent to his brother, Julian L. Yale, who was general sales agent of the company, and purchasing representative of the Big Four Railroad and Carnegie Steel Co., serving the Vanderbilts and Andrew Carnegie. Yale became Treasurer of the Yale Lock Company from 1867 to 1873, founded by his grandfather Linus Yale Sr., and father Linus Yale Jr.. Under the presidency of Henry R. Towne, Yale and Towne would build and scale the company into a global conglomerate, with thousands of employees.

In 1871, Yale is named of the trustees of the Rensselaer and Saratoga Railroad, with Congressman Joseph M. Warren, and Congressman John A. Griswold, of the Griswold family. In 1874, he cofounded and was made board director of the Timber Brook Railroad Company, along with his brother Julian L. Yale, and Gen. Edward A. Wild. The railroad would be 12 miles long, connecting New Jersey to the iron mines, and used to transport coal and iron ore. About 10 years later, Yale would be involved in the telegraph industry, mainly through the Bankers and Merchants Telegraph Company, by founding number of branches, and becoming board director, secretary, treasurer and shareholder.

== Bankers and Merchants Telegraph Co. ==
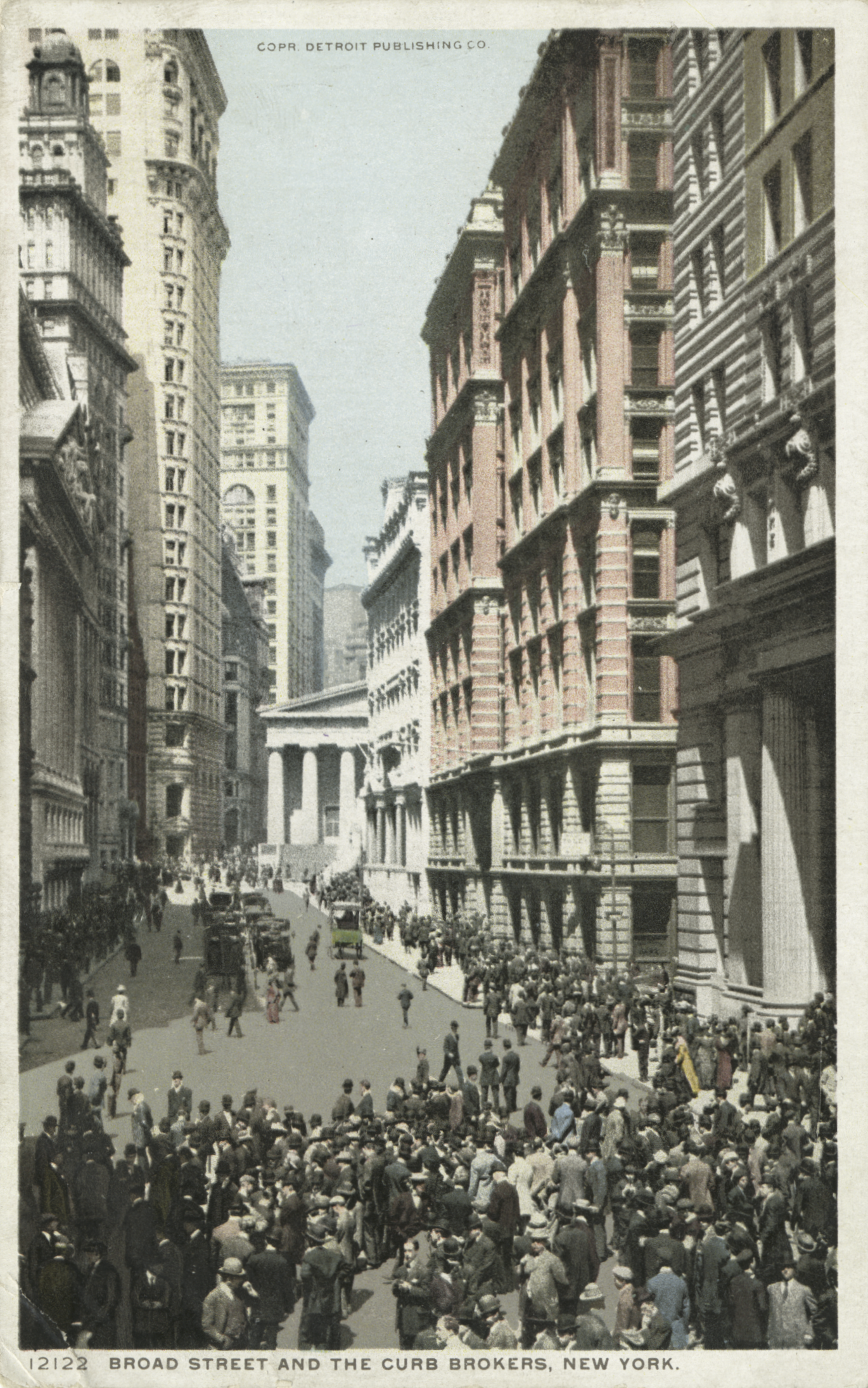
Broad Street, where the Bankers and Merchants Co. had their first office, including one inside the New York Stock Exchange

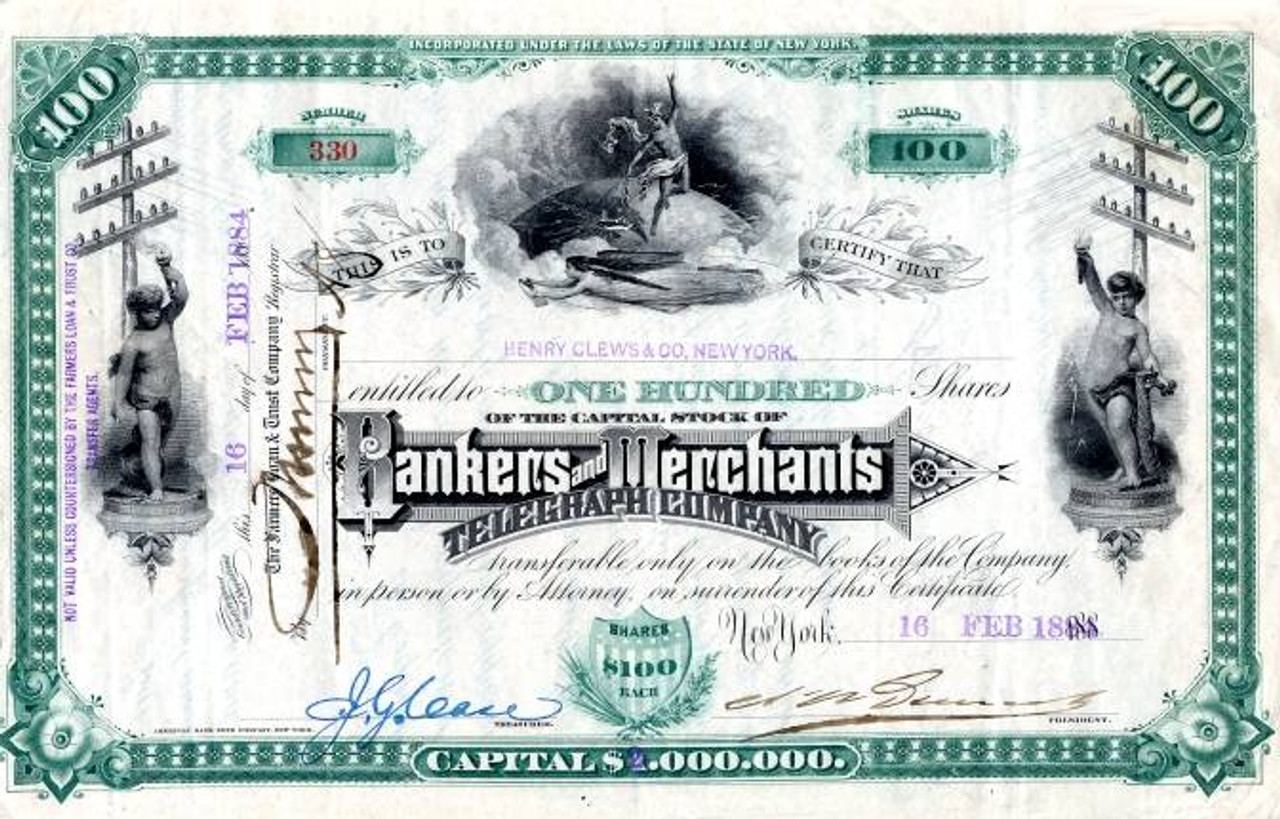
Certificate of 100 shares of Yale's Bankers and Merchants Telegraph Co., to financier Henry Clews, with 2 million dollars in capital stock under the American Bank Note Co.

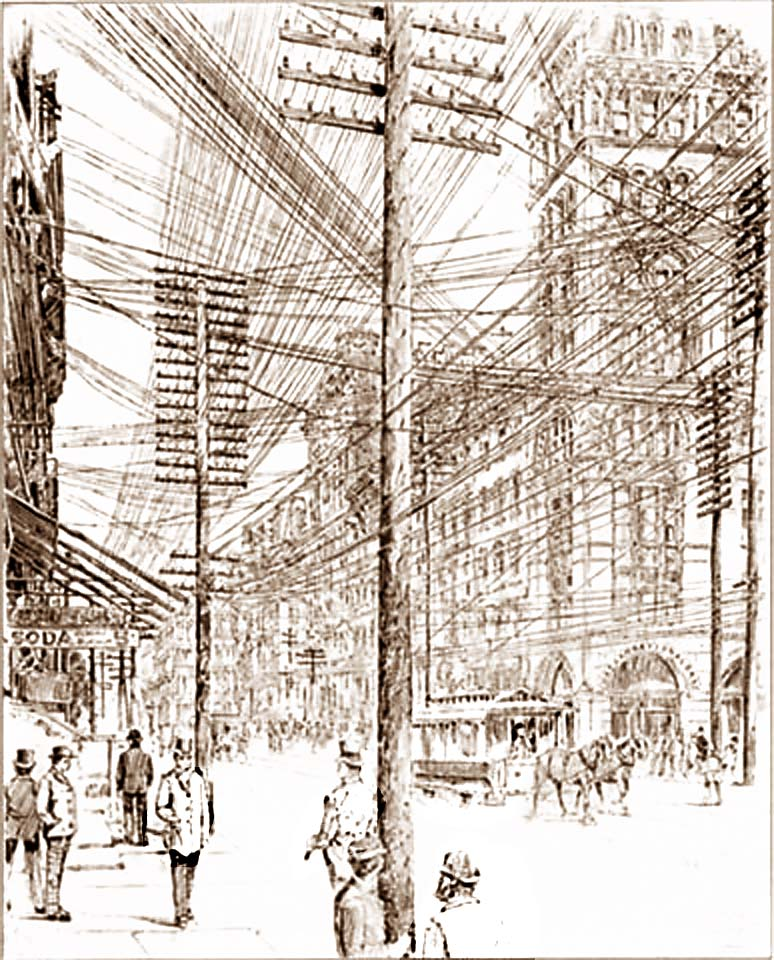
The telegraph lines on Broadway, connecting the buildings in 1890

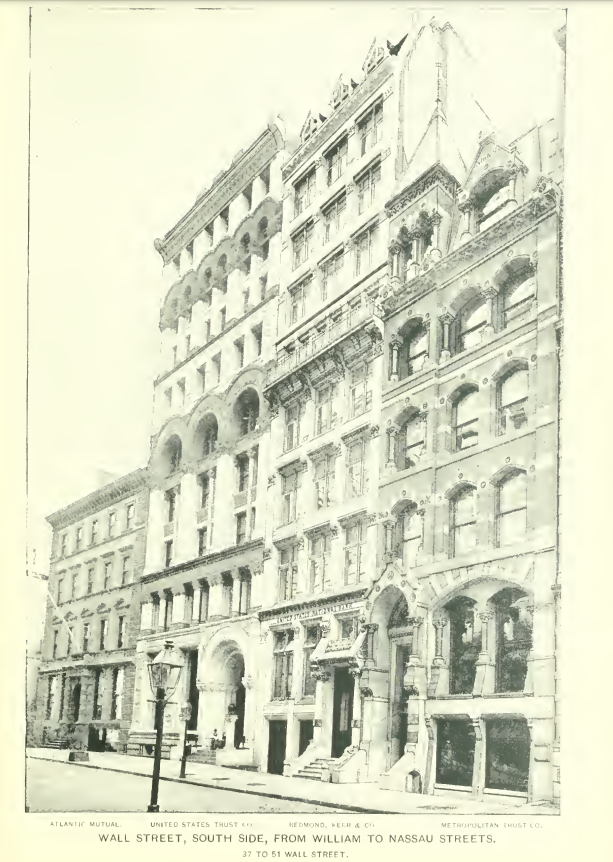
American Rapid Telegraph Co. building at 41-43 Wall Street, previous U.S. National Bank, between the two tall buildings toward the right

The Bankers and Merchants Telegraph Co. was incorporated in April 1881, with a capital stock of $1,000,000, and started operating 12 wires from Boston to Washington, D.C. through New York City, Philadelphia and Baltimore, with additional charters for New Jersey and Pennsylvania. Their line between New York and Washington would make them very successful for a time, and have them acquire and control the American Rapid Telegraph Company, who had lines between New York and Boston, Hartford, New Haven, Providence, Buffalo, as well as in the oil region in Pennsylvania, Pittsburgh, New Castle and Cleveland.

They kept both companies as separated entities, but under the same president and general manager, with Yale being the companies's treasurer and board director. The Rapid Co. had about 3 million dollars in capital stock, and the scheme allowed them to not pay in double the rents to the cities and towns where they operated. The company was created to allow businessmen to communicate between major cities, with most shareholders coming from New York and Philadelphia. While the business was mostly owned and operated by bankers and merchants, it could also be used by the public.

They initially had their office at 26 Broad Street, Manhattan, next to the New York Stock Exchange, where they also had an office inside the building, seated at 18 Broad Street. At the time, America was ahead of Britain, having twice as many telegraph offices and twice the amount of mileage in railroads. In 1882, they received the exclusive rights to build, maintain, repair and operate wire lines for the south of Chicago, using the underground conduits of the Chicago Sectional Electric Underground Co. of president Elisha Gray. The company used wires from the Kerite Company in their iron pipes. They later sold their rights to the Postal Telegraph Company. They then acquired the Southern Telegraph Co., adding lines between Washington, New Orleans and Atlanta.

In 1883, Yale founded with his brother, Julian L. Yale, and others, the Bankers and Merchants Telegraph Company of Cleveland, and filed the papers with the Secretary of State, James W. Newman. They will construct, maintain and operate telegraph lines from Cleveland to Cincinnati, Toledo and others places in Ohio. In the same year, Yale founded with four others the Bankers and Merchants Telegraph Co. of Detroit, building lines through Michigan, Columbus, Indianapolis, Chicago, Detroit, and other places. He then cofounded the Bankers and Merchants Telegraph Co. of Chicago, operating telegraph and telephone lines in Illinois and other places.

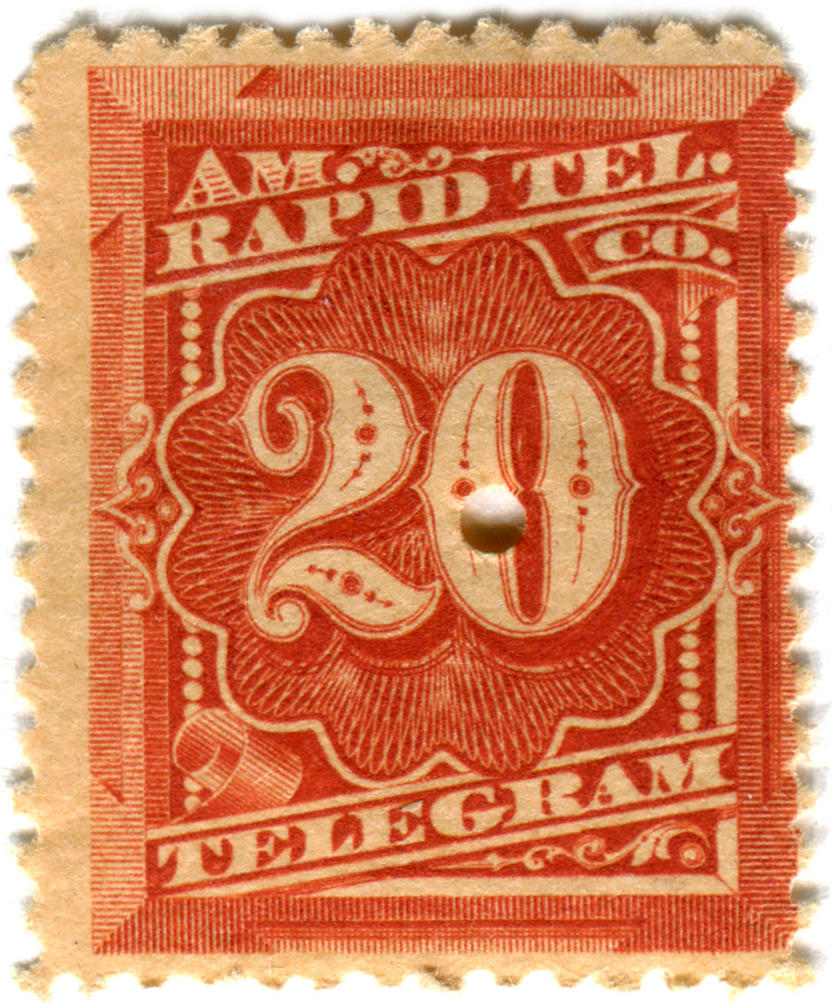
Stamp of the American Rapid Telegraph Co., used for the payment on delivery

In 1884, Yale joined the retail business Nave & McCord Mercantile Company of millionaire Nave McCord. He then became board director, secretary and treasurer of the Bankers and Merchants Telegraph Company, along with vice president John Rogers Hegeman, who was also president of MetLife Co., seated at the Metropolitan Life Insurance Company Tower in Manhattan. They added various lines connecting to Detroit, Indianapolis, Cincinnati and St. Louis, and in 1884, they acquired and took control of the telegraph lines of the Chicago Board of Trade, operating in the landmarked Chicago Board of Trade Building.

== Commercial Telegram Co. ==
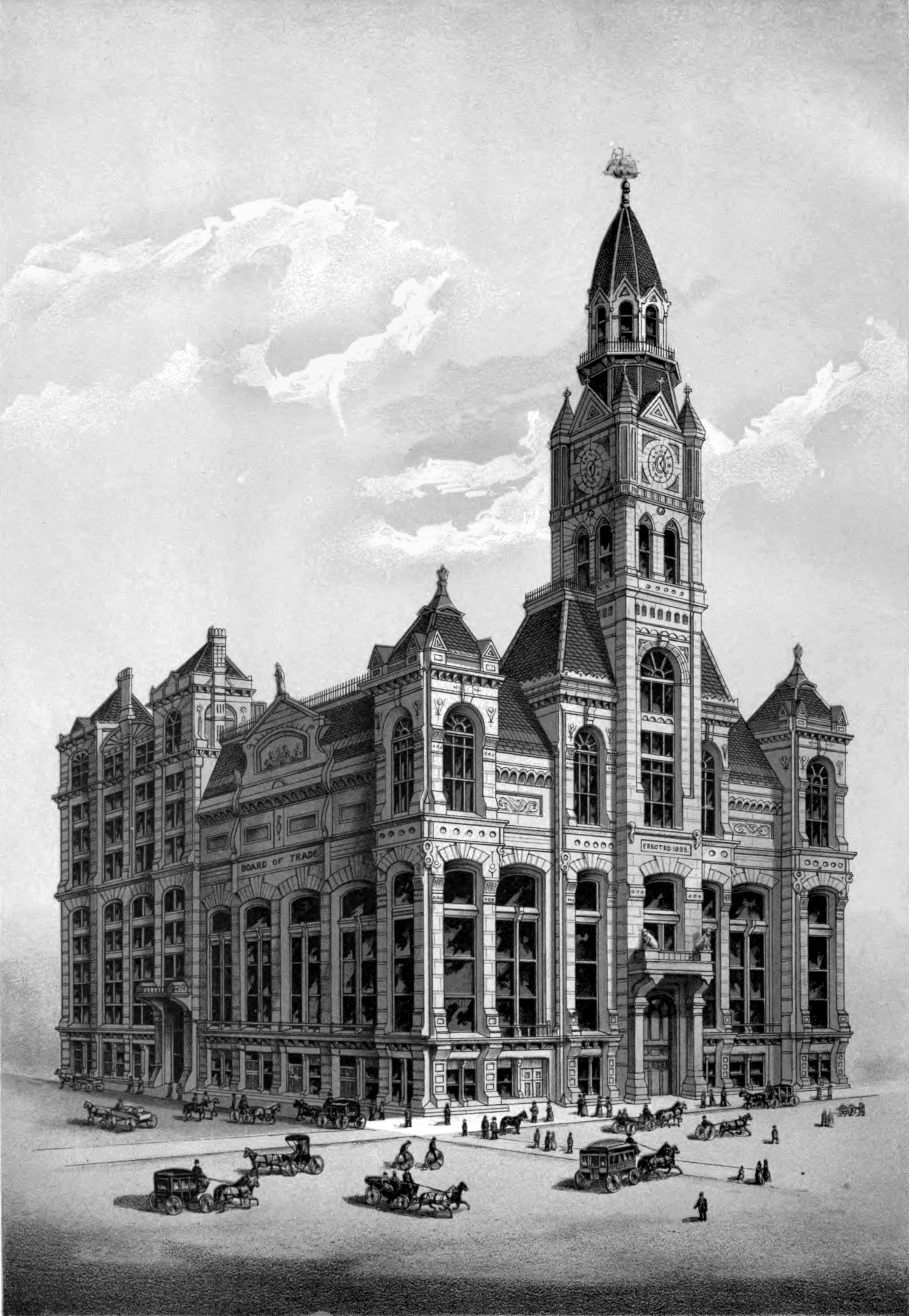
Chicago Board of Trade around 1885, the Bankers and Merchants Co. controlled some of their telegraph lines for stock quotations

In February 1884, they acquired the Lehigh Telegraph line, adding 300 miles and 90 new offices in Eastern Pennsylvania. They acquired control of the Commercial Telegram Company, and established branches for the stock quotations of the Boston Stock Exchange and Philadelphia Stock Exchange. Yale was elected a board director of the Commercial Telegraph Co. in January, along with the president of Bankers and Merchants Co., A. W. Dimock, and the president of the Chicago Board of Trade Telegraph Co., Charles W. Brega. Another board director with Yale was inventor Stephen D. Field, nephew of pioneer Cyrus W. Field, and founder of the first electric railroad operated as a business. Field also challenged Thomas Edison's monopoly on stock exchange quotations.

In April 1884, Yale was elected Secretary of the Bankers and Merchants Telegraph Co., and the company had now 6,697 miles of poles, and 46,347 miles of wire, connecting New York all the way to the Gulf of Mexico, the Atlantic and the Missouri River. Yale was a friend and assistant of president Dimock, and would introduce, with other board directors, the second stock indicator of the Chicago Board of Trade, adding new telegraph lines, and challenging the monopoly of the Western Union. The Commercial Telegram Co. used the ticker tape technology, and broke the monopoly of the Gold and Stock Telegraph Co. of inventor Edward A. Calahan, on the New York Stock Exchange.

The stock ticker was a telegraph whose message was only securities prices. By having exclusivity, the Gold & Stock Co. was the only company who had the rights to have clerks on the NYSE trading floor to record and communicate the latest quotes to their private customers. They grew their business and technology with the young Thomas Edison as partner, who would later invent the phonograph and light bulb. In 1890, the Commercial Co. was acquired by the New York Stock Exchange, which they renamed the New York Quotation Company, and used it to supply exclusive ticker tape services to its official members. The Bankers and Merchants Co. became quoted on the New York Stock Exchange, and in June 1884, the Panic of 1884 on Wall Street caused their stock price to fall from 119 to 45, bringing financial difficulties.

The company then issued, with the Farmers' Loan and Trust Company, about 10 million dollars in bonds to finance their Western expansion, building thousand of miles of telegraph lines, which would later cause legal problems with its bondholders, including General John G. Farnsworth, appointed Adjutant General of New York by Gov. Cleveland, and the Western Union Telegraph Company. The case would involve Attorney General of Illinois, Col. Robert G. Ingersoll, and the company would be reorganized. The reorganization caught the attention of the Western Union Telegraph Co. of robber baron Jay Gould, who would see the Bankers and Merchants Trust as potential rivals, scheming for the company's downfall, which was also part of the lawsuit with Col. Ingersoll and Senator Roscoe Conkling.

Yale's company was defended by lawyer Edward Lauterbach, the notable defence attorney of the Wolf of Wall Street, David Lamar. The Bankers and Merchants Telegraph Co. was seated at 187 Broadway, Manhattan, at the past headquarters of the Postal Telegraph Company next to the Western Union Telegraph Building, while the company they acquired, the American Rapid Telegraph Co., was seated at the United States Bank Building, at 41-43 Wall Street, next to the Bank of Manhattan Trust Building.

== Bankers and Merchants vs Western Union ==
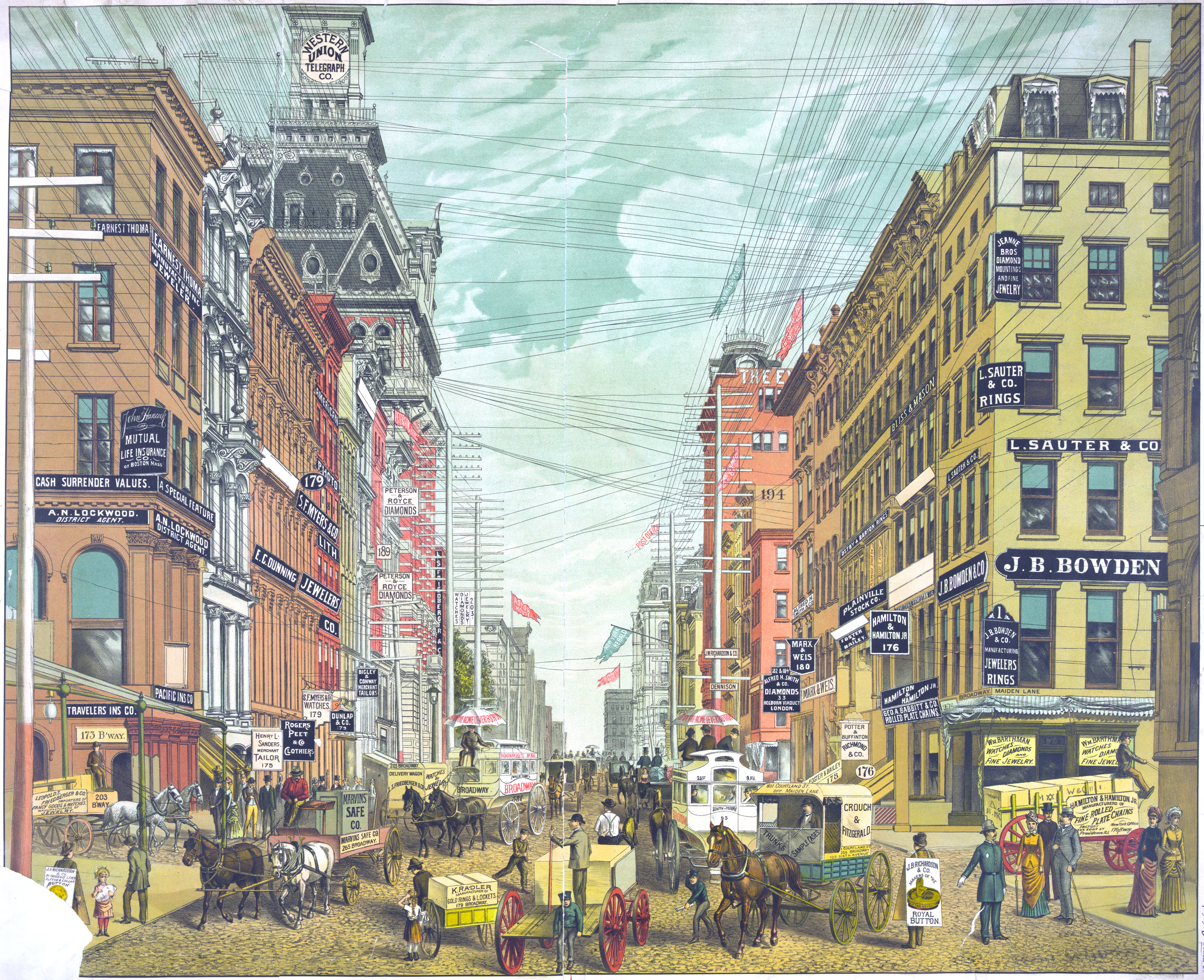
Broadway, Manhattan, Bankers and Merchants Co. was on the left, white stone building with 189 sign, before the Western Union Telegraph Building

During the night of July 10, 1885, General Eckert of the Western Union organized a raid with 40 men with axes under the orders of Jay Gould, and entered Yale's company headquarters at Broadway and cut all the wires belonging to the American Rapid Company on the building's cupola, and carried them out to the Western Union Telegraph Building, disrupting Yale's business and bringing hundreds of telegraph operators out of employment, having lost many of their customers. The Western Union was also cutting the company's lines in various parts of the country at the same time.

This unlawful act broke the communication lines of their everyday customers between Kansas City, St. Louis, Chicago, Pittsburgh, Cleveland, Boston, Washington, D.C. and Philadelphia. At that time, the Bankers and Merchants company had 24,000 miles of wire, and 400 offices across the country, making all of them useless as a result. Along with the Baltimore and Ohio Company, and the Postal Telegraph Company, they were the only remaining business rivals of the Western Union. The Western Union was previously led by William Henry Vanderbilt, having resigned in 1881, and had been mostly financed by Cornelius Vanderbilt's money. A main advantage of the Western Union was that its lines followed the railroads, which allowed them to reach all the minor cities.

The Bankers and Merchants Co. had 2 million dollars invested in the American Rapid Company, and the company's receiver would be General Edward Harland. One of the Bankers and Merchants's largest bondholder during the trial with Ingersoll was industrialist Edward Stiles Stokes, past convicted murderer of his robber baron business rival, financier James Fisk. Stokes described the act of Gould's Western Union to a New York World reporter as "one of the most high-handed outrages that has ever been perpetrated upon the public", and denounced the past Western Union manipulation of President Cleveland's election. According to Stokes, the Western Union acted to get rid of all remaining competition, and to frighten the people from putting any money into the telegraph business.

The Western Union had been involved in a similar case years before, when they sent 100 men to destroy 75 miles of lines of the Merchant's National Company, property of the Atlantic and Pacific Telegraph Company, bankrupting the former and using the legal system to their advantage. Judge William Davis Shipman ordered the Western Union to return all the Bankers and Merchants's wires and poles, including the 6,000 miles of wires stolen from the American Rapid Company between Cleveland and Boston. General Edward Harland supervised the restoration procedure. As the Western Union was a bondholder of the American Rapid Co., the Bankers and Merchants Co. then had to restore the lines to the latter's company, and were effectually cut off from any line connection west of Cleveland, and from most of the oil cities.

The Western Union received the American Rapid Company for about $500,000, less than its worth in poles and wires, and about a year before, Western Union's president said that he would have offered 1 million dollars for the company, or about 2.1 billion dollars in 2024 money in relation to GDP. In 1885, the bankrupt Bankers and Merchants Telegraph Company would be acquired by one of the four Bonanza Kings, being the industrialist John William Mackay, and be combined with the Postal Telegraph Company to form the United Lines of Telegraph. By combining the Baltimore and Ohio Telegraph Company, Bankers and Merchants Co. and the Postal Telegraph and Cable companies, Mackay now controlled over 16,000 miles of pole lines, and 120,000 miles of wire lines. Mackay would die in 1902 with a fortune of about 50 to 100 million dollars, and his son would build the Harbor Hill estate on Long Island.

== Later career ==
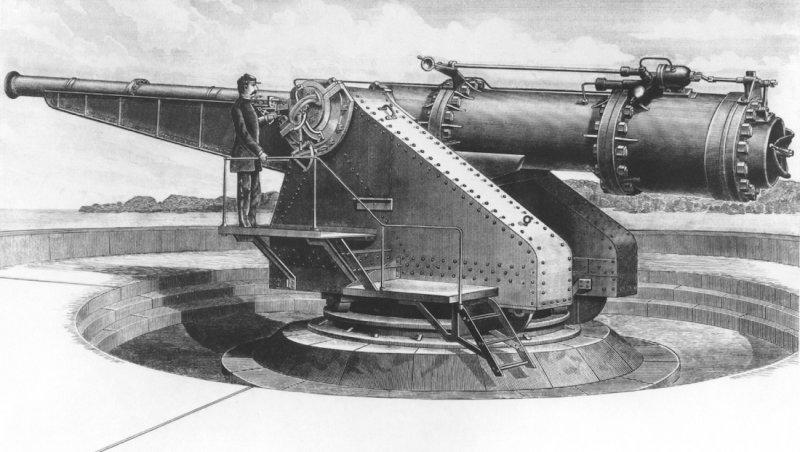
Capt. Edmund Zalinski's dynamite gun, used and sold by Yale's company, the Pneumatic Dynamite Gun Co.

The company owed Yale about $300,000 in 1885 as one of its trustees and shareholders, or about 650 million dollars in 2024 money in relation to GDP. The amount owed would raise to over $600,000 in 1900. The Bankers and Merchant's initial capital stock in 1881 was at 3 million, the American Rapid at 4, and the Postal Telegraph Co. at 21. Yale's company had initially 4,000 miles of lines and 23,200 miles of wires, with debt of about 7,5 million. By 1884, they had 5,000 miles of poles, 64,000 miles of wires, 400 offices, an interest in a stock exchange, the control of a telephone company, and had plans for ocean cable lines. The company eventually controlled about 10,000 miles of poles, and 100,000 miles of wire. The chairman of the company was Congressman Dwight Townsend, while Western Union's president was Norvin Green, serving under controlling shareholder Jay Gould, the robber baron of Lyndhurst Castle.

In 1890, Yale became a board director and trustee of the Pneumatic Dynamite Gun Company under president Spencer D. Schuyler, an acquaintance of J.P. Morgan, with the company seated at the Empire Building, and manufacturing war weapons for the British. The 50 feet Dynamite gun was built at the West Point Foundry in Cold Spring, and was used as an artillery weapon using air to propel projectiles made of dynamite. The dynamite explosive charge was at 500 pounds with a maximum range of 5,500 feet. Yale organized a private demonstration of the war weapon, where the dynamite flew 2 miles, with about 100 attendees, including Col. Rupert Ryan of the Royal Artillery, representing the English War Office, Maj. Gen. Wallace F. Randolph, Chief of Artillery, Commander Seaton Schroeder, family member of Benjamin Franklin, Maj. Gen. Daniel Butterfield, and others.

They had 1.1 million dollars in capital stock and obtained contracts from the US government to equip the USS Vesuvius, based on Capt. Edmund Zalinski's patents, as well as contracts to supply Fort Schuyler and Fort Warren in Boston Harbor. Around 1897, Yale cofounded the Hudson River and Berkshire Railroad Company, with the approval of Gov. Roger Wolcott, and with a capital stock of $100,000. The 65 miles railroad would run over New York Central to Poughkeepsie, Aneram, Hartford, Boston, Springfield, Maine, and other places. He would also become its vice president and one its board directors, and the firm would be seated at 40 Wall Street, with about 175 miles in total length.

== Personal life ==
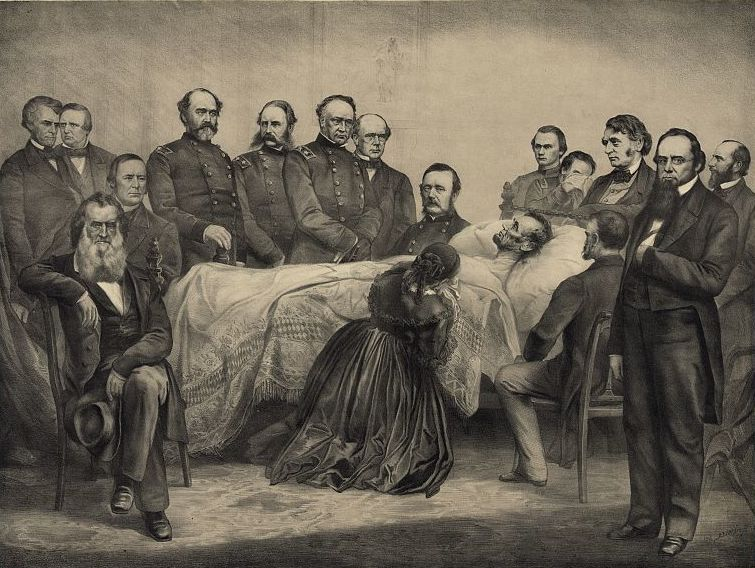
The last moments of Abraham Lincoln on April 15, 1865, with Yale's father-in-law, Hugh McCulloch, at the bed's end on the left, with Mary T. Lincoln, Capt. Robert T. Lincoln, Salmon P. Chase and surgeon Charles Leale

Yale married to Marie Louise McCulloch, daughter of millionaire banker Hugh McCulloch, the Secretary of the Treasury of Abraham Lincoln, and two other presidents. The wedding guests included U.S. President Chester A. Arthur, Gen. Tecumseh Sherman, Secretary of State Frederick T. Frelinghuysen, Navy Secretary William E. Chandler, Attorney General Robert G. Ingersoll, Gen. Philip Sheridan, Russian Minister Karl von Struve, and other senators, generals and ministers.

Hugh McCulloch was with Abraham Lincoln the morning and night of Lincoln's assassination, and assisted him at his death bed until his last moments. Yale's wife inherited the Holly Hills Farm from her father, with its 350 acres of land and $100,000 in improvements, near Hyattsville, Maryland. She was a correspondent of Assistant Secretary Alvey A. Adee. She was also a socialite with cabinet members of the White House, and with Miss Benjamin Odell, Governor of New York, as well as with other debutantes. In 1900, Yale accompanied her to the Grafton Hotel with Baron Louis Ambroz of the Austrian-Hungarian legation.

Yale's brother-in-law, banker Charles McCulloch, became president of the Hamilton National bank, and lived at the McColloch mansion in Fort Wayne. Yale's mother-in-law died at his home in Sparkill, New York, and he himself died at the same place on August 28, 1904, at 58 years old. Mrs. McCulloch was a grandniece of Naphtali Daggett, President of Yale College, and a family member of Gen. Moores, Gen. Melanchton Woolsey, Congressman Jonas Platt, and Alida Livingston, of the Schuyler and Livingston families.

Yale had one daughter named Mattiray Yale, and the family lived on Fifth Avenue in New York. Yale was also a member of the abolitionist Union League Club of New York, along with his brother Julian L. Yale and the Roosevelts, who were officers of the club, namely Theodore Roosevelt as a vice-president, and his uncle James A. Roosevelt as board director.
