= Linus Yale Jr. =

American mechanical engineer (1821–1868)

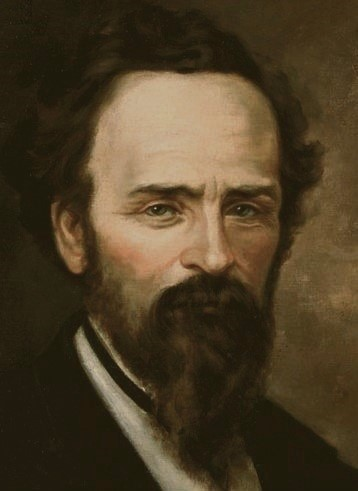
- Inventor of the Pin-Tumbler Lock and founder of Yale Lock Co.
- Born: April 4, 1821; Salisbury, New York, U.S.
- Died: December 25, 1868 (aged 47); New York City, U.S.
- Burial place: Arms Cemetery, Shelburne Falls, Massachusetts
- Occupations: Businessman, inventor, mechanical engineer, metalsmith
- Known for: Yale Lock; Yale Bank Lock; Yale Chilling Iron Safes and Vaults; Pin Tumbler Locks and Cylinder Locks
- Spouse: Catherine Brooks Yale
- Children: John B. Yale; Madeline Yale Wynne; Julian L. Yale
- Parent(s): Linus Yale Sr. Chlotilda Hopson Yale
- Family: Yale
- Awards: National Inventors Hall of Fame

Notes
- Yale Genealogy and History of Wales

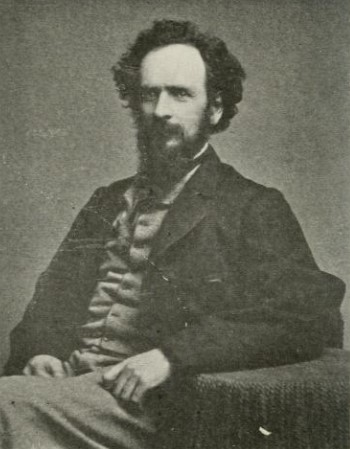
Linus Yale Jr., portrait

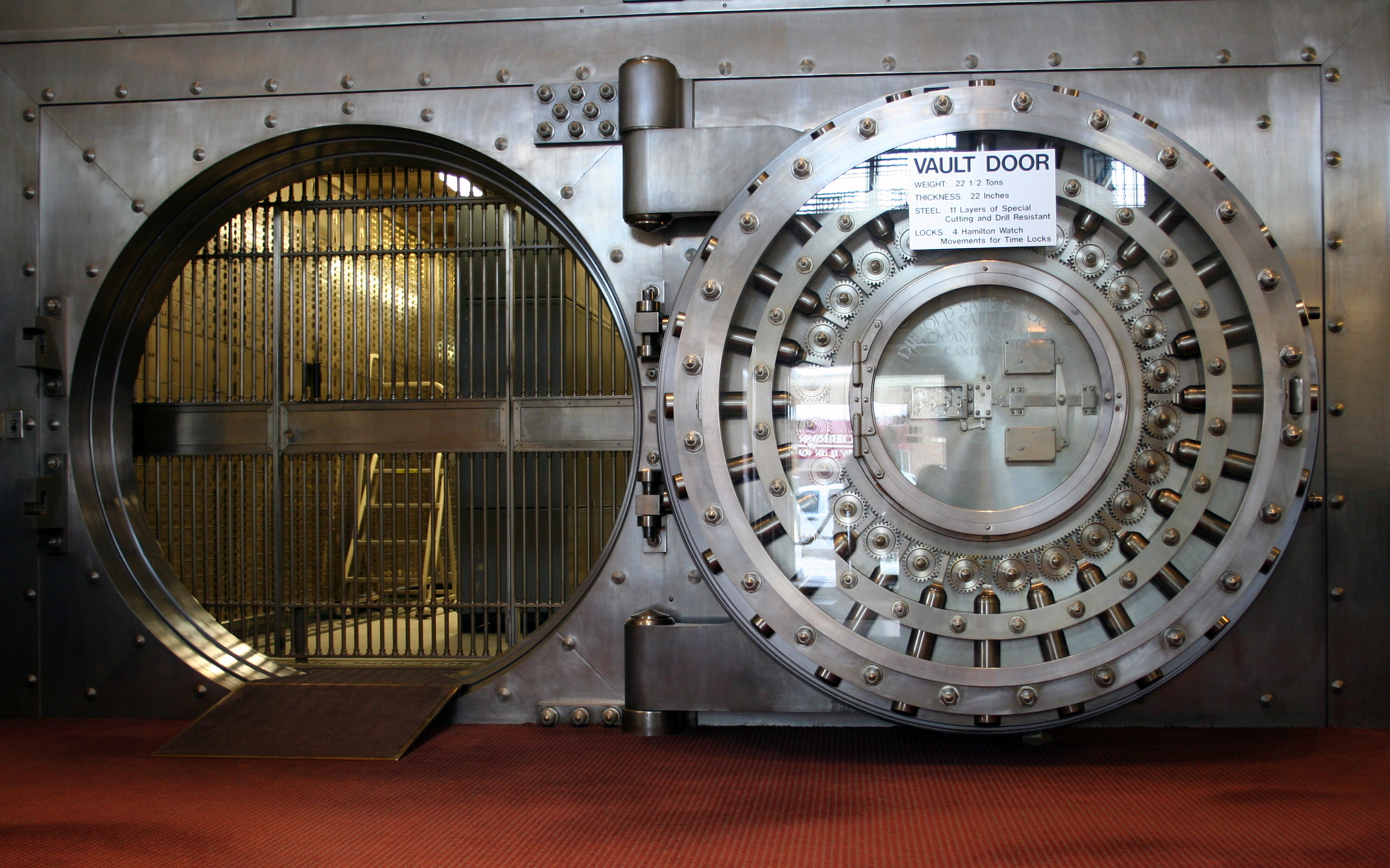
Example of a bank vault and vault door. Yale would receive orders from the United States Treasury Department in 1857.

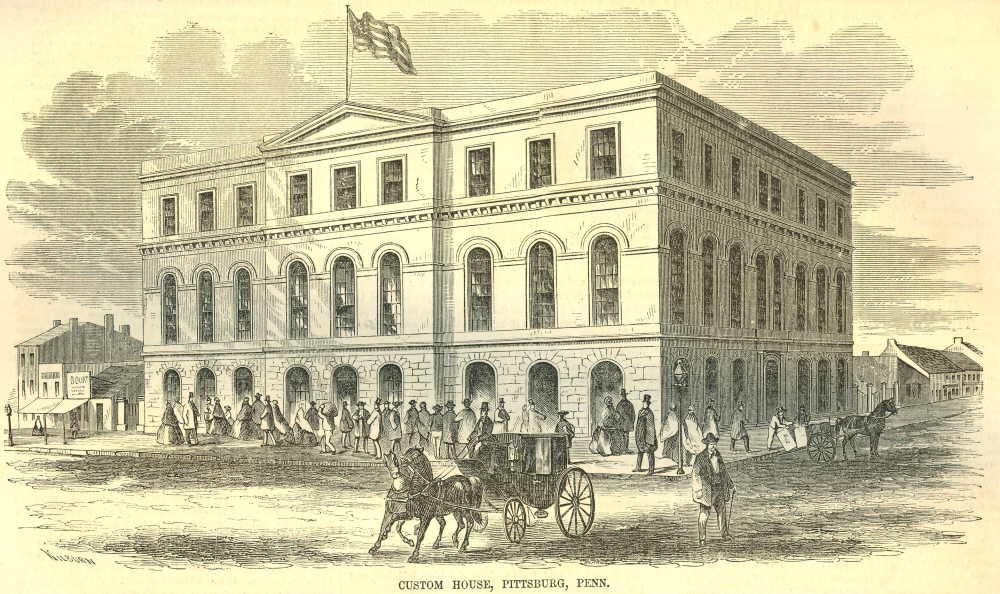
Custom house of Pittsburg 1857, a customer of Linus Yale

Linus Yale Jr. (April 4, 1821 – December 25, 1868) was an American businessman, inventor, mechanical engineer, and metalsmith. He was a co-founder with millionaire Henry R. Towne of the Yale Lock Company, which became the premier manufacturer of locks in the United States. He was the country's leading expert on bank locks and its most important maker. By the early 20th century, about three-quarters of all banks in America used his bank locks. He is best remembered for his inventions of locks, especially the cylinder lock, and his basic lock design is still widely distributed today, and constitutes a majority of personal locks and safes.

== Biography ==
=== Youth ===
Linus Yale Jr. was born in Salisbury, New York. His ancestors were of the same family as Elihu Yale, the benefactor to and namesake of the well known Yale University. The Yale family of America were all descended from the same ancestor, Thomas Yale, Elihu's only uncle with the Yale name. Thomas Yale was the stepson of Governor Theophilus Eaton.

Yale's father, Linus Yale Sr., opened a lock shop in the 1840s in Newport, New York, specializing in bank locks; he was a successful inventor who specialized in expensive, handmade bank locks and mechanical engineering, and who held eight patents for locks and another half dozen for threshing machines, sawmill head blocks, and millstone dressers.

=== Career ===
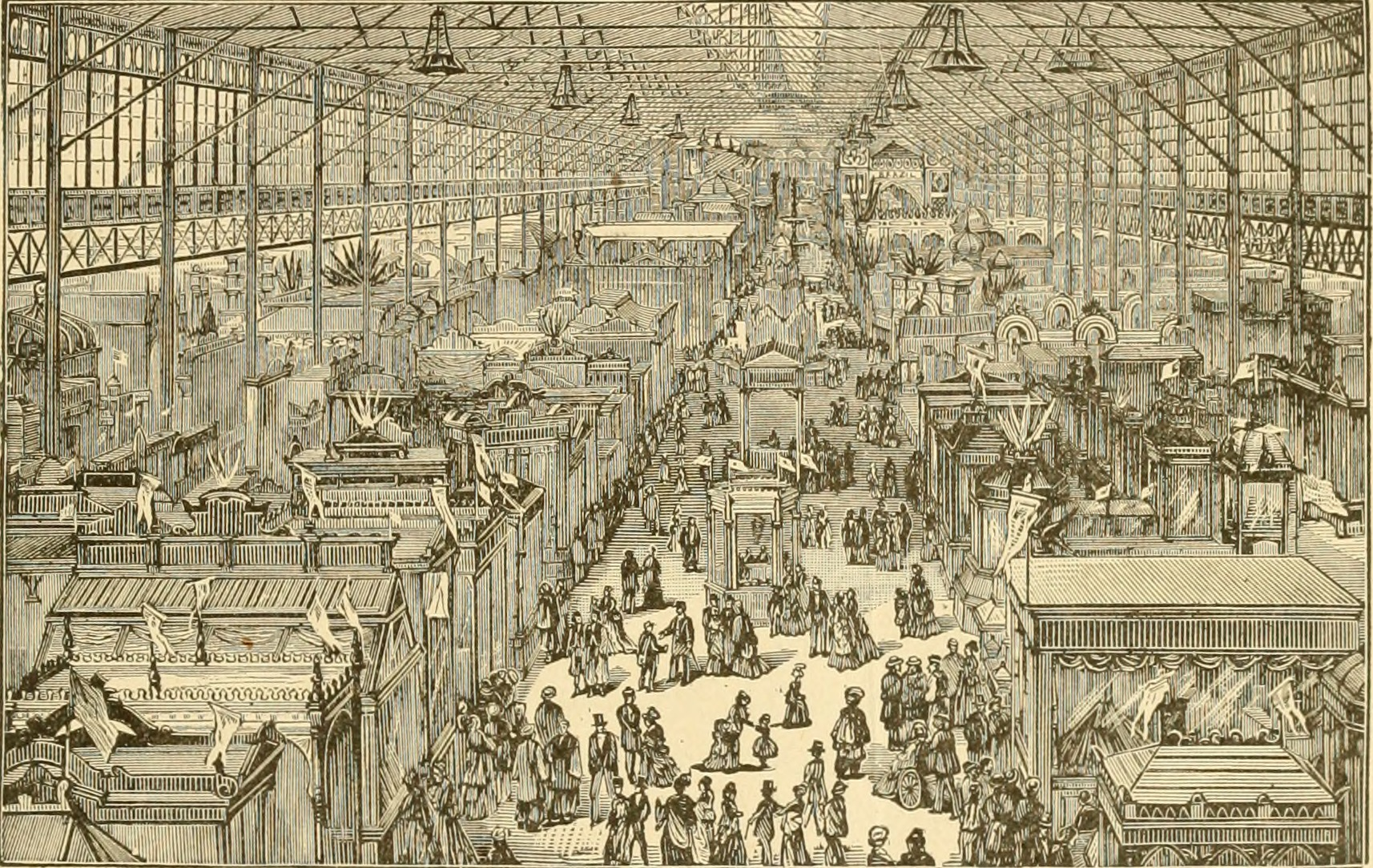
Yale Lock fair, showing the Yale exhibition on the west side, and the Waltham Company of Massachusetts

After some regular education, Yale Jr. joined his father's business and introduced some revolutionary locks that utilized permutations and cylinders. In 1857, he established the Yale & Greenleaf Lock Co. with his future brother-in-law, Congressman Halbert S. Greenleaf, who also financed the venture. In 1858, Yale's father died, and Linus Yale Jr. became more involved with his father's lock company. Yale Jr. was joined in the family business by his cousin, Charles Oscar Yale, who was also a prolific lock inventor with several patents.

Yale opened his own shop about 1860 in Shelburne Falls, Massachusetts, specializing in bank locks. He later founded a company with millionaire Henry Robinson Towne in the South End section of Stamford, Connecticut, called the Yale Lock Manufacturing Company. Throughout his career in lock manufacturing, Yale acquired numerous patents for his inventions and received widespread acclaim from clients regarding his products.

=== Personal life ===
Yale was personal friends and frequent correspondent with the abolitionist Congressman William Morris Davis.

== Work ==
=== Portrait painting ===
Young Yale developed an early affinity for portrait painting, but about 1850 switched interests to assist his father with improving bank locks and studying mechanical problems. However, his artistic expertise later proved useful, drafting clear and accurate diagrams for his later lock designs.

=== Locks and mechanisms ===
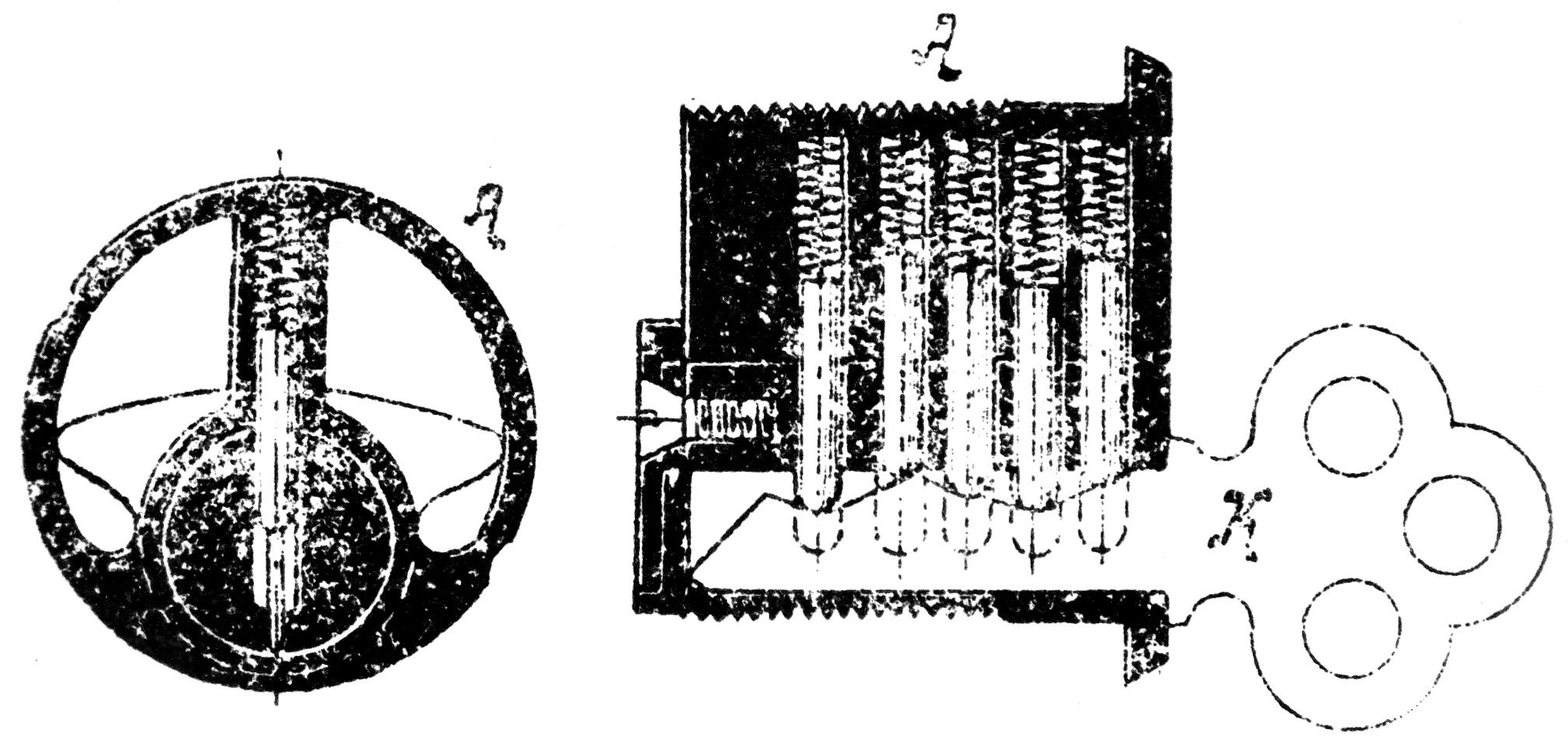
Yale lock system, Otto's Encyclopedia

In the 1860s, around the time he had opened his own shop in Shelburne Falls, Massachusetts, Yale specialized in bank locks. He introduced some combination safe locks and key-operated cylinder locks that were improvements on previously used locks. Possessing admirable skills in mechanics and lock making, Yale created one of the first modern locks that used a pin-tumbler design.

The pin-tumbler design is also known as the cylinder design, and plays significant roles in today's locks and safes. Yale had previously harbored the practical implementation of the tumbler lock for decades, and had sketched the idea in 1844. Yale was convinced that key holes in traditional locks made the locks susceptible to thieves who could use picks, gunpowder explosives, and heat to thwart the locks. This led him to employ permanent dial and shaft designs in his inventions, known as "combination locks" today. Yale's best-known lock design, the cylinder pin-tumbler lock, utilized a key-operated lock concept first conceived in ancient Egypt over 4,000 years ago.

Yale's inventions were so successful and received such critical acclaim that he exhibited several of his lock designs at world's fairs in the United States and overseas, winning a number of awards at these exhibitions.

Throughout his career Yale acquired many patents, mostly related to his inventions of locks and safes, but also including mechanical problems. In 1858, he patented a device for adjusting at a right angle the joiners' square. In 1865 he patented a tool for reversing the motion of screw-taps. In 1868 he received two patents for improvements in mechanics' vises.

=== Inventions ===
Yale had many inventions to his name throughout his career, thoroughly revolutionizing the locks industry and improving the security of financial institutions. Drawing on the principles first put to use in large wooden locks built by ancient Egyptians, Yale patented a pin tumbler lock for use in banks in 1851; he patented his pin tumbler lock for use in doors in 1863; in 1865 he patented the pin tumbler padlock, which are still widely used today. Yale's model of the padlock was smaller, sturdier, more reliable, and innovative, proving to be a distinction among locks of his day.

==== Yale Bank Lock ====
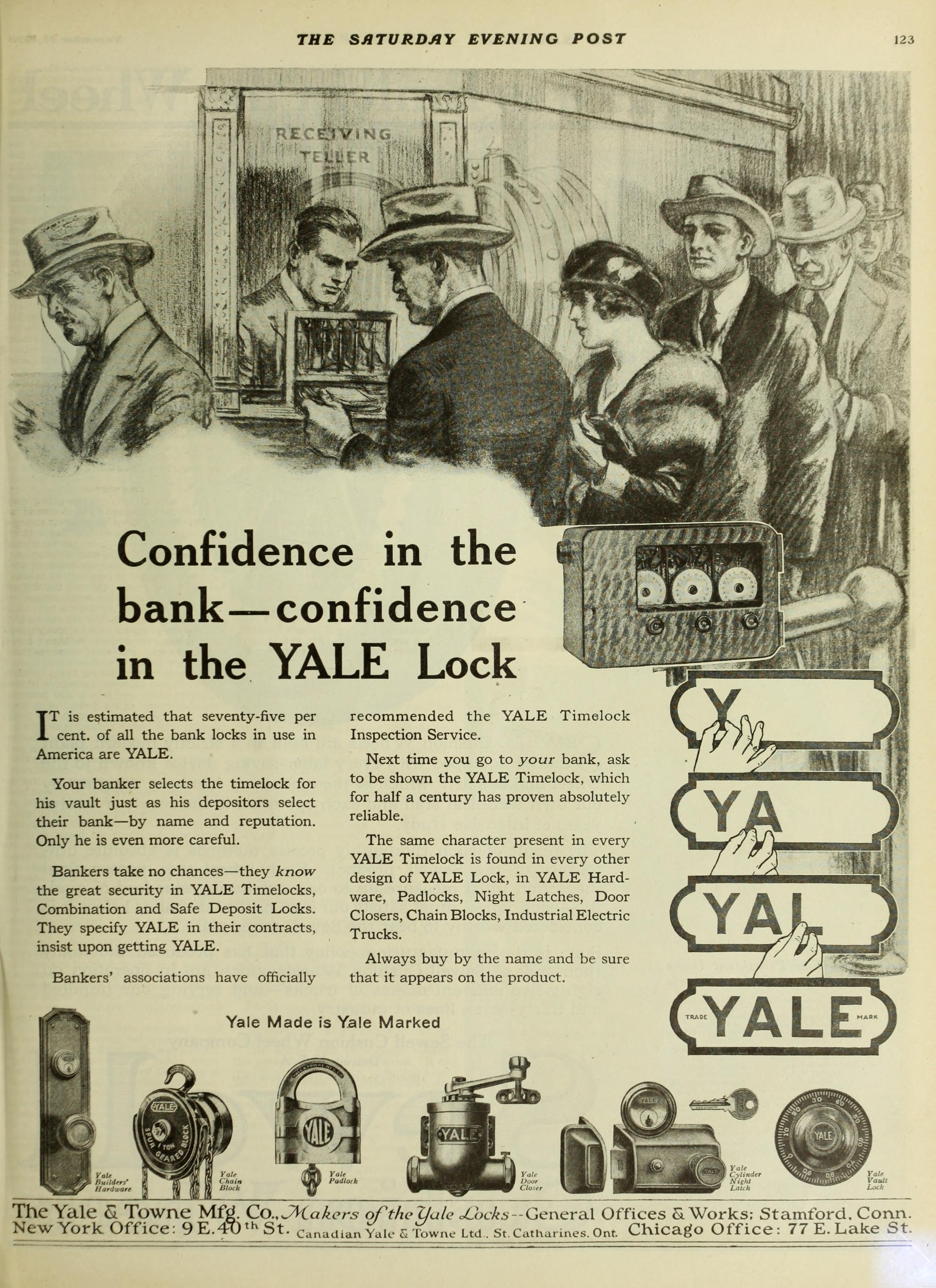
Yale Bank Lock advertising, referring to their use in around 3/4 of all banks in America

In 1851 Yale invented what he referred to as the "Yale Magic Infallible Bank Lock", for safes and bank vaults. This design allowed the owner to change its combination and would also allow the key to secure the lock while being hidden away from the exterior of the door by a hardened steel plate, which covered the keyhole behind it.

Yale stated nine peculiarities for his Yale Magic Infallible Bank Lock that separated it from its peers:

1. Being without springs, there are none to fail; it is impossible to damage by fire, dampness, or neglect. The design rid itself of the vices of the springs that become rusty or softening by heat or moisture.
2. The lock has a head that is detached from its key-bits, thus leaving a space between the head and the key-hole, making it virtually impossible to be picked.
3. When the key is withdrawn, all print or record of its action is obliterated, and no tell-tale left for duplicate keys to be made
4. Powder proof. No powder can possibly be introduced into the lock itself, which eliminates the threat of gunpowder explosions.
5. Permutation lock has the ability to rearrange new key combinations.
6. In the event of a lost key, a duplicate key can be set up to unlock the lock, and upon changing the arrangement of the lock, the lost key will be powerless to open the lock.
7. The portability of the key conveys a vast advantage over traditional bank locks.
8. Every motion of the lock is derived from movement of the hands rather than elements beyond the operator's control, such as dirt, rust, or memory.
9. The lock is not liable to get out of order, having been made by first class machinists.

==== Other locks ====
Yale Safe Lock

Yale's second great invention came around 1863, which he coined the name "Yale's Magic Infallible Safe/Door Lock". This lock has many of the scintillating qualities of the Yale Bank Lock, and is designed for fire-proof safes and cash doors, among other items. It does not utilize springs, and is powder, damp, fire, and thief proof. The lock is not, however, a permutation lock, but each lock is unique and two different locks can never be opened with the same key. In addition, the key must be withdrawn from the lock before the bolt can be unlocked, preventing the liability of carelessly leaving the key in the keyhole.

Yale Chilled Iron Vaults and Safes

Yale's other significant invention is the Chilled Iron Bank Doors and Vaults. Previous bank doors, vaults, and safes had plates of hard cast behind soft wrought iron, which can be easily broken using the right amount of leverage and skillful vault-picking. The hard casts are often rigid and fragile, and susceptible to heavy tinkering. Yale used a lattice screen, or basketwork of soft, tough wrought iron, instead of the hard cast, infused in the metal covering of the vaults, thus producing incomparably strong corners and surfaces that Yale presented to be unbreakable.

=== Yale Manufacturing Company ===
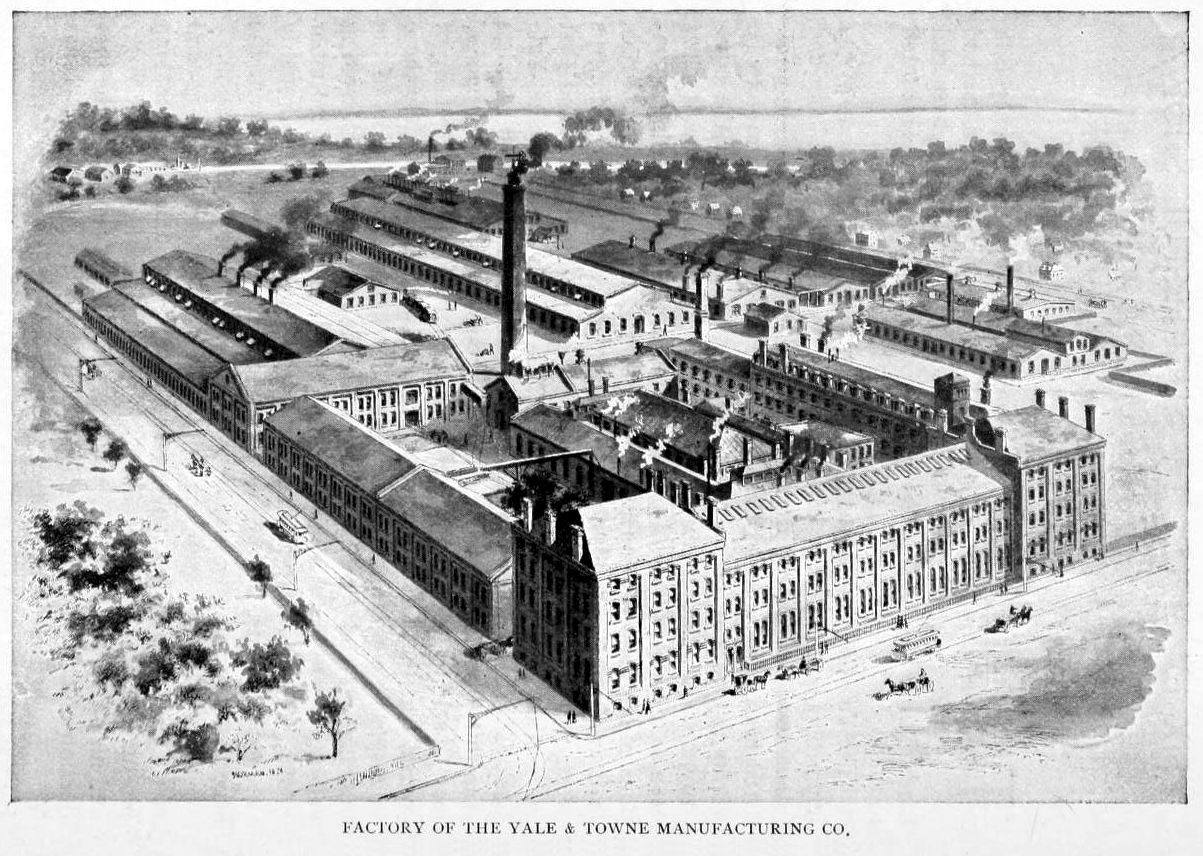
Yale & Towne Manufacturing Co., in 1897. By the early 20th century, the enterprise evolved into an international conglomerate, serving customers in over 120 countries, with a workforce of about 12,000 employees

In 1868, Yale and Henry R. Towne founded the Yale Lock Manufacturing Company in Stamford, Connecticut, to produce cylinder locks.

Under Yale's ingenuity and wide promotion of his inventions, Yale locks quickly spread around major corporations in the United States and were widely adopted. Among some of Yale's business tactics were exploiting the weaknesses in other locks and presenting how his were free of those vices; he did live demonstrations to corporate business executives and government officials that showed how he successfully picked the locks that were in operation. Due to these demonstrations and the sheer quality of Yale's locks, Yale Lock Manufacturing quickly gained business ground. The company's name was later changed to The Yale and Towne Manufacturing Company, which eventually became part of NACCO Industries.

Cracking the Hobbs Lock

The prominent bank locks of Yale's day were the Hobbs or Newell locks. In an effort to present his locks over the continued usage of the Hobbs Locks, Yale contacted notable bankers and set up a live demonstration in which he successfully picked a Hobbs Lock. As described by Samuel Hammond, one of the bankers present at Yale's demonstration, "[he] proved that the Hobbs lock is able to be picked and demonstrated it using a fake wooden key that he made". [1]

Challenge to the World

As part of Yale's business plan and effort to promote his bank locks, Yale presented a challenge to anyone who dared to pick his bank locks. He offered a $3000 (a hefty sum) reward to potential challengers, in the event that his locks were successfully picked.

== Reception ==
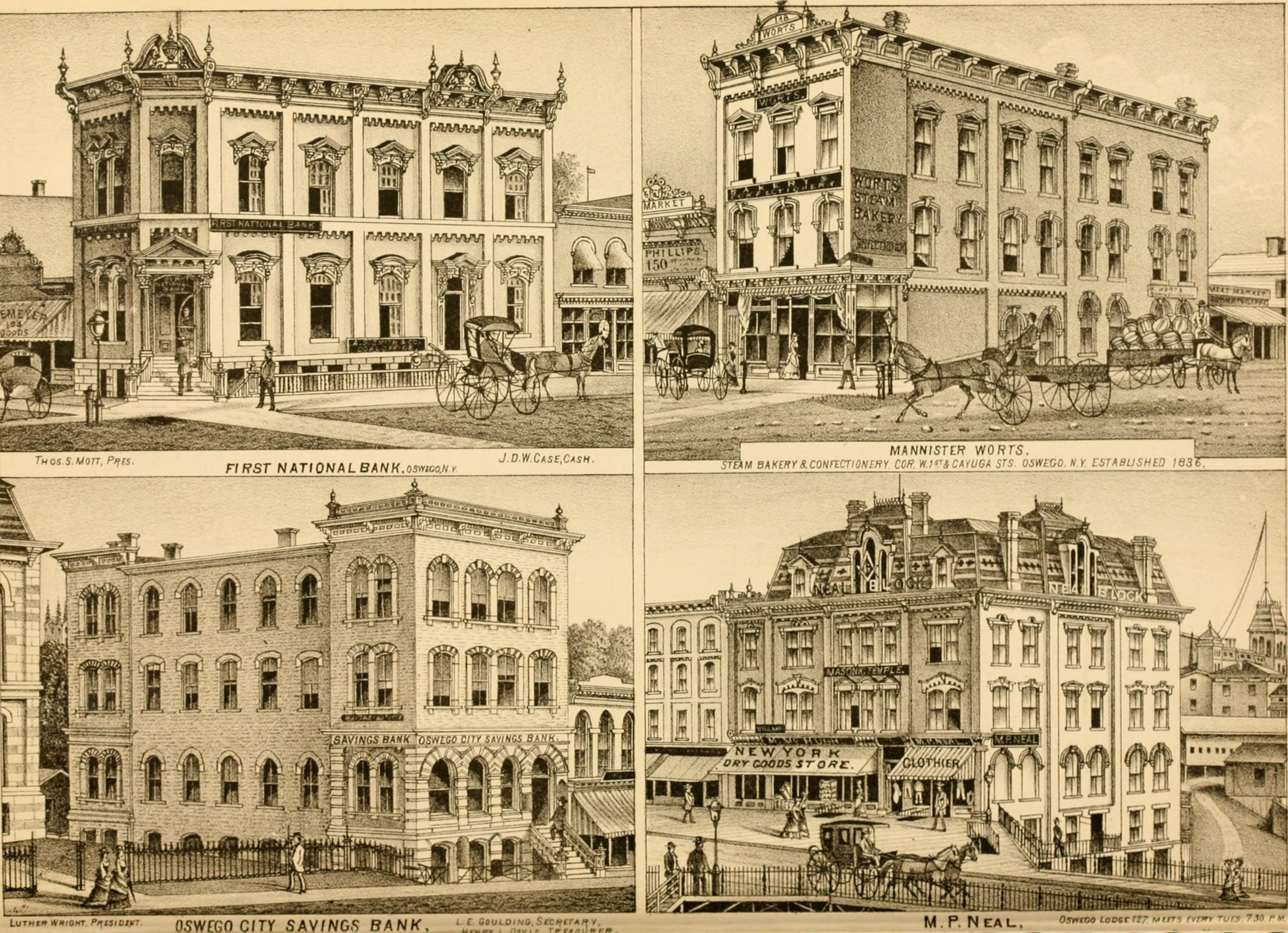
Early banks in Oswego County, New York, customers of Linus Yale Jr.

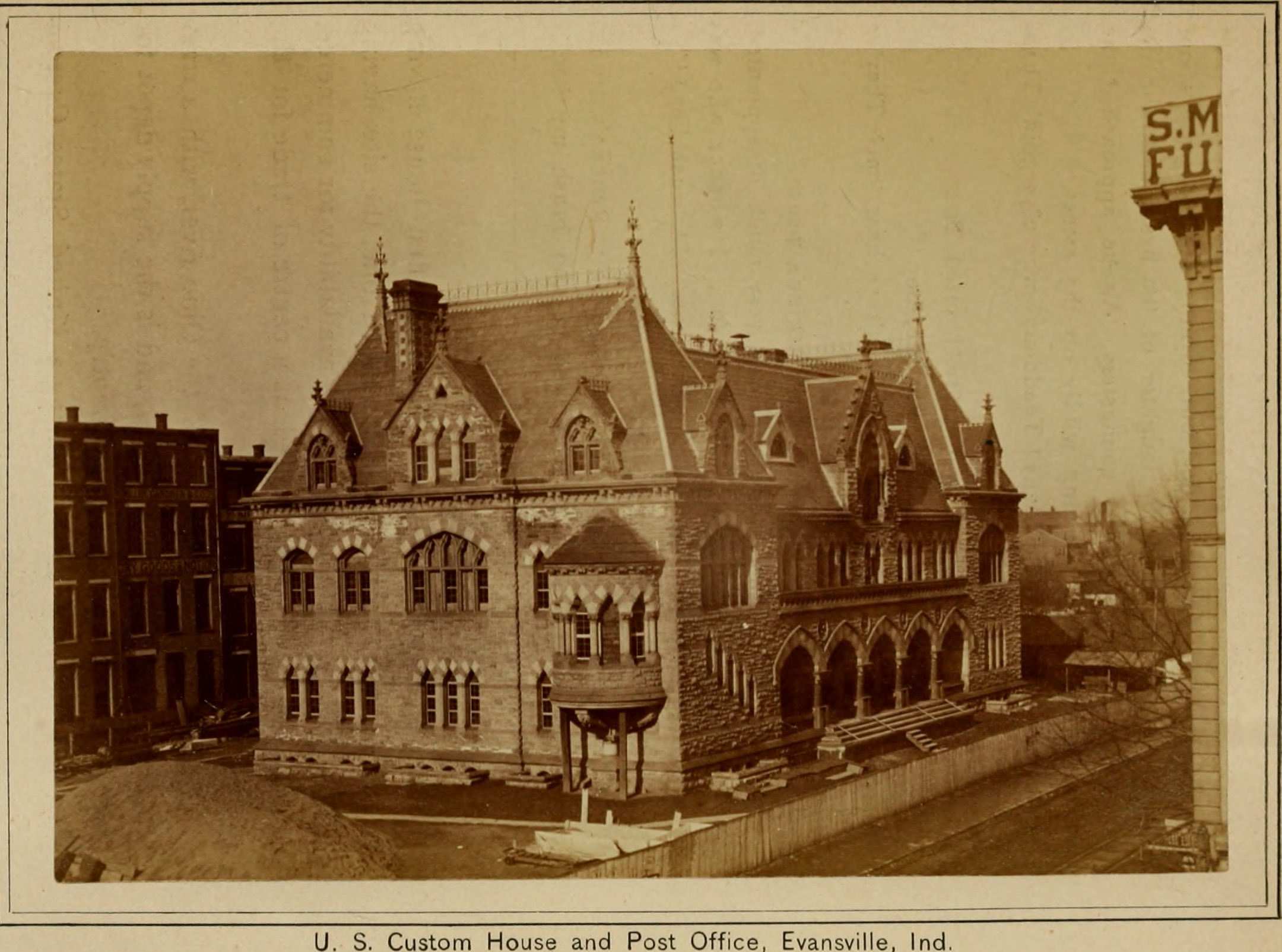
George P. Bissell and Co., bank dealers and customers of Yale Lock Company

During the mid 1850s, bank robberies were a problem for many bankers and the U.S Government. Having proved their Yale Bank Lock was infallible, they obtained contracts with the leading banks. In 1856, after a commission appointed by the Secretary of the Treasury, the US Treasury Department selected Yale's enterprise to become the sole supplier of bank locks, safe locks, burglar proof safes, and vault doors, for all the new Mint, Sub-Treasuries, and Custom-Houses in the United States, and received praised from U.S. Mint director, James Ross Snowden in correspondence letters. Customers included the Bank of New York, American Express, Knickerbocker bank, and dozens of other banks.

Leading banks and bankers of the era hired him as a consulting expert and engineer to design their safes and locks.

The clients' satisfaction in Yale's inventions was echoed in their appreciation letters addressed to Yale:

"Briggs Bank, Clyde, April 30, 1856
Linus Yale Jr.,
Dear Sir: *** About two months since, during a dark and stormy night, our bank was entered by burglars, through an adjoining cellar wall, and the vault, which was of brick, was pierced, which left us without any other protection than one of your highly approved chilled iron Burglar-Proof Safes, with your magic lock attached; these we deem sufficient, for they successfully resisted all the various devices and expedients known and practiced by burglars. We have the most implicit confidence in their strength and safety, and feel assured that when once locked, we are more secure than we should be with any other safe and lock ever yet invented.

Yours, respectfully,
WH. H. Coffin, Cashier".

"I am convinced to this knowledge of the true principles of locks has enabled [Yale], in his lock, to overcome not only this, but every other known method of picking; and, in fact, I consider it and all respects superior to any other lock in the market".

-Samuel Hammond. NY, January 12, 1856

=== Death and legacy ===
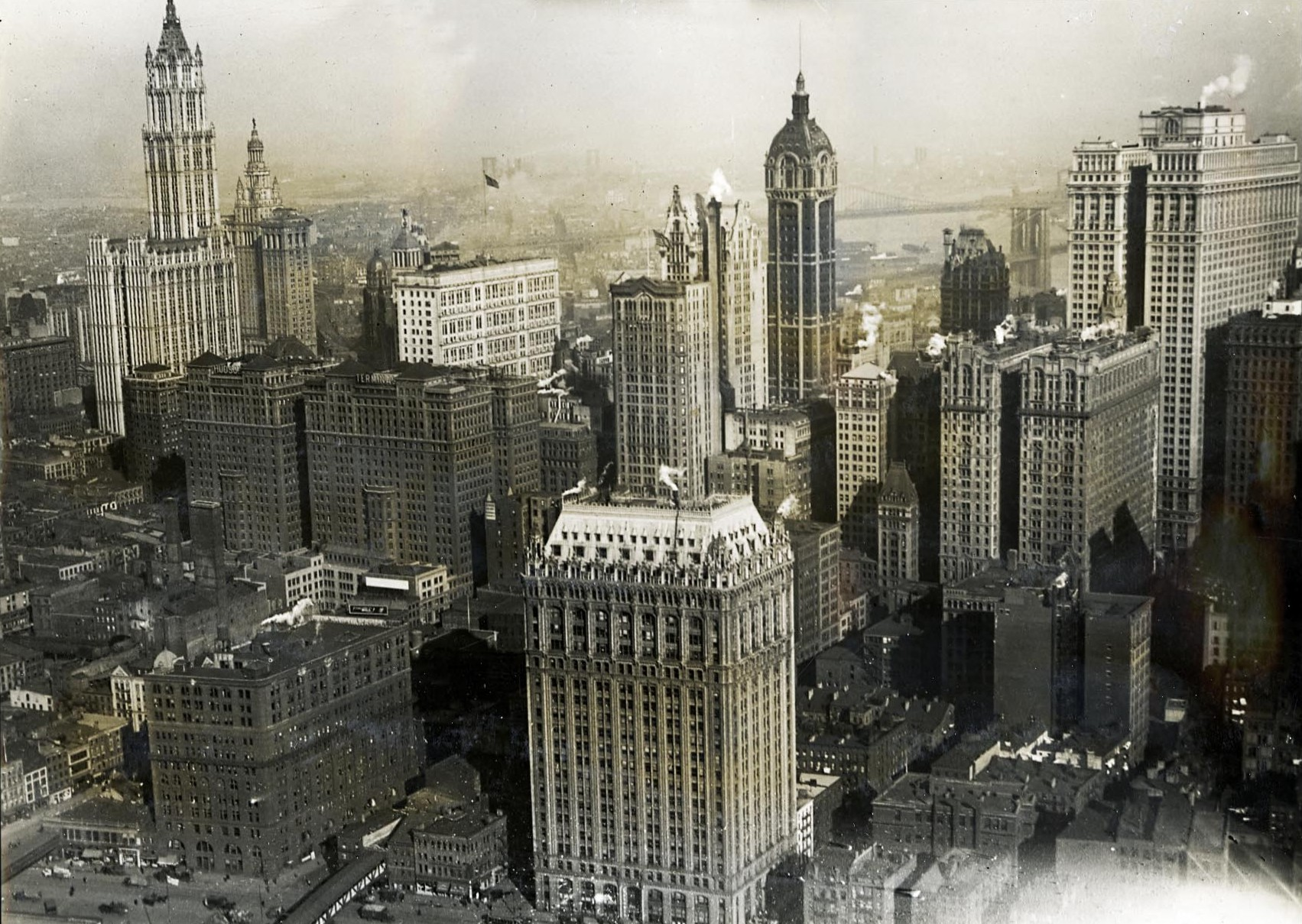
New York City, 1919, the Yale Lock Company will become the suppliers of many early skyscrapers in the city, such as the Chrysler Building

On a business trip to New York City in 1868, the same year that the Yale Manufacturing Company was founded, Yale died suddenly of a heart attack while negotiating to have his locks installed in a skyscraper, the Equitable Building. By that time, his locks were already selling well, and under Towne's management Yale Locks became the premier manufacturer of locks in the United States.

Yale's locks still play a major part in today's security systems. In his later years, Yale perfected the mechanism known as the "clock lock" and invented the double lock, which placed two locks within one case to be operated by the same or different combinations. His improvements in locks and boxes for the post-offices are of recognized utility and worldwide adoption. The commonly used combination locks omnipresent today also owe their existence to Linus Yale Jr.

Following his death, his son John B. Yale joined Henry R. Towne, became Treasurer, and helped grow the enterprise into a global giant manufacturing business, employing 12 000 people with customers in 125 countries.

In 2006 Yale was inducted into the National Inventors Hall of Fame.

== Family ==
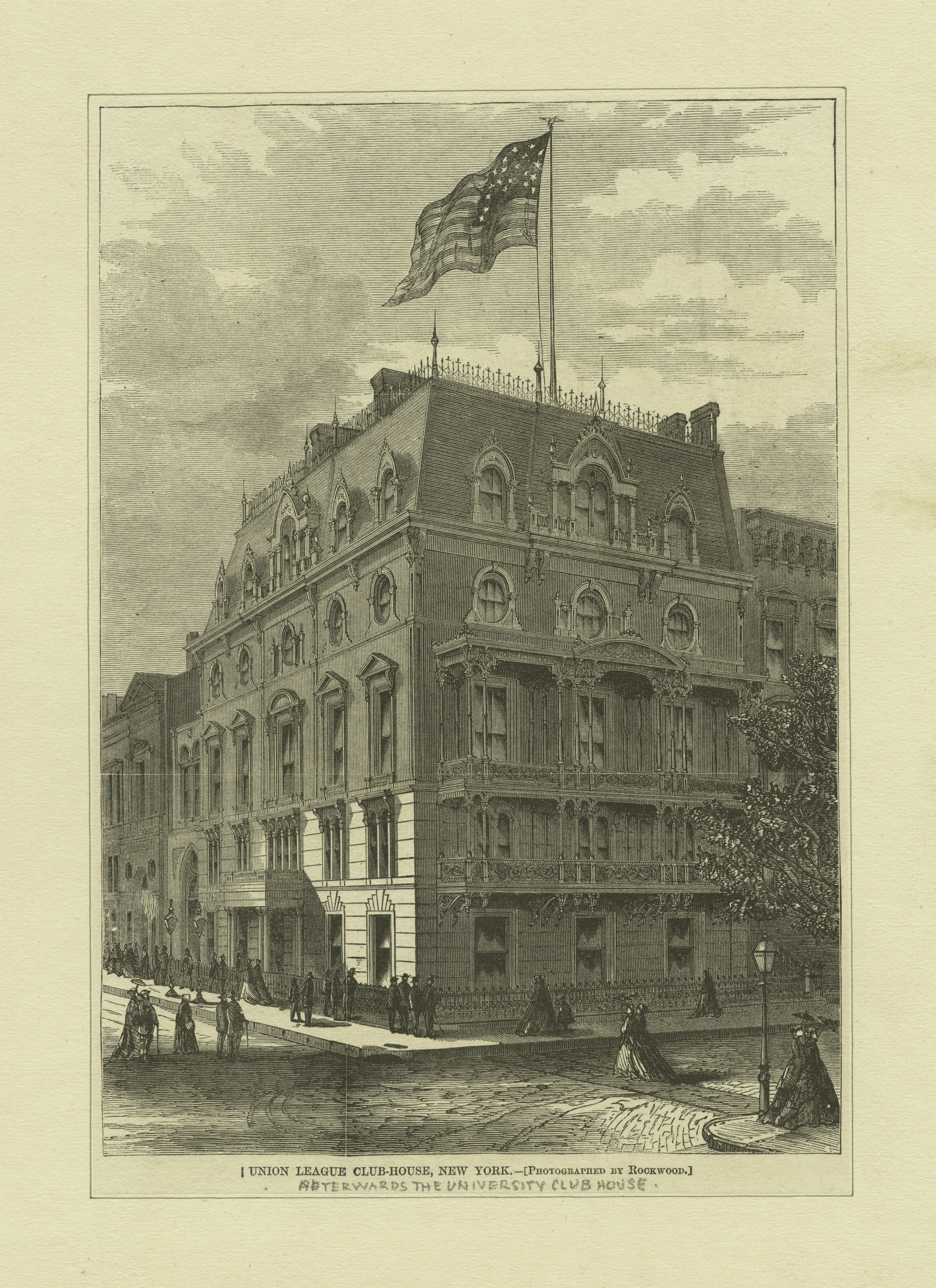
Union League, clubhouse of New York, his children were members at its beginning in 1870

Yale was married to Catherine Brooks, who was born into a prominent New England family, and was credited for her active work in the abolitionist cause in Philadelphia, where she worked as a teacher at the school of abolitionist architect Theodore Dwight Weld. She was the daughter of John Brooks, a doctor and member of the Legislature. His grandson was the Governor of Wyoming Bryant Butler Brooks, and his cousin was the Bishop of Massachusetts Phillips Brooks. Catherine's favorite teacher was the famous Ralph Waldo Emerson, who was from Massachusetts as well. Her half-sister, Jean Brooks Greenleaf, was also married to Congressman Halbert S. Greenleaf, and was elected President of the New York State Women's Suffrage Association. Together, they had three children.

- John B. Yale (1845−1904), who joined the Union League and married Marie Louise McCulloch, daughter of the U.S. Secretary of Treasury, Hugh McCulloch, who financed the American Civil War under Abraham Lincoln. He was also Treasurer of the Yale Lock Company, founded by his father, Representative of the Illinois Steel Company from N.Y. in the Empire Building, and scaled the Yale Lock Company with Henry R. Towne into a global company, with 12 000 workers and their products sold in more than 120 countries. The Illinois Steel Company was the largest steel producer in the United States and later acquired Carnegie Steel with J.P. Morgan.
- Madeline Yale (1847−1918), an artist and philanthropist who married Senator Henry Winn, son of Senator Reuben Winn.
- Julian L. Yale (1848−1909), the owner and President of Julian L. Yale & Co., a Railway supply business from the Railway Exchange Building and the Rookery Building in Chicago. He introduced the Shelby Steel Tube to the railway market and was previously Vice-President of American Mckenna Process Company, a rail manufacturer with offices and plants in Illinois, Boston, and New Jersey. His customers were Carnegie Steel, Illinois Steel, Lackawanna Steel, etc. He also became a member of the Union League Club of New York, the Union League Club of Chicago, the Chicago Club, the Chicago Athletic Association, the Cliff Dwellers Club, the Union Club, and the St. Louis Club.

Another member of his family was William Henry Yale (born 1859), dry goods merchant, owner of Townsend & Yale, one of the oldest and largest commission house in the U.S., with offices on Fifth Avenue, New York, Boston, Chicago, and Philadelphia. The firm was the sole agent of the Boston Manufacturing Company, one of the first factories in America. He was a Yale graduate, and a member of the Yale Club, Union League Club of New York, and Sons of the American Revolution. His father, Henry Clay Yale (1829–1897), was a member of the Union League Club of New York, and his great-grandfather, Broughton White, was Secretary of Founding Father Baron von Steuben, who also adopted Broughton after his father, Patriot Lt. White Jr., bankrupted himself financing the American War of Independence.

Linus was also a distant cousin of Gov. Elihu Yale of Yale University, media entrepreneur Moses Yale Beach, and Canadian fur trader James Murray Yale. His nephew was architect Merton Yale Cady.

== Listing of patents ==
- May 6, 1851 U.S. patent 8,071 — Newport, New York
- October 19, 1852 U.S. patent 9,350 — Newport, New York
- December 21, 1852 U.S. patent 9,497 — Newport, New York
- July 12, 1853 U.S. patent 9,850 — Newport, New York
- June 3, 1856 U.S. patent 15,031 — Newport, New York
- October 19, 1858 U.S. patent 21,861 — Philadelphia, Pennsylvania
- November 9, 1858 U.S. patent 22,048 — Philadelphia, Pennsylvania
- June 12, 1860 U.S. patent 28,710 — Philadelphia, Pennsylvania
- January 29, 1861 U.S. patent 31,278 — Philadelphia, Pennsylvania (Locks or fastenings for special use for drawers)
- May 14, 1861 U.S. patent 32,331 — Philadelphia, Pennsylvania (Locks for use with special keys or a plurality of keys; keys therefor the key being a card, e.g. perforated, or the like)
- June 27, 1865 U.S. patent 48,475 — Shelburne Falls, Massachusetts (Cylinder locks and other locks with tumbler pins which are set by pushing the key in)
- June 27, 1865 U.S. patent 48,476 — Shelburne Falls, Massachusetts (Driving main working members rotary shafts, e.g. working-spindles)
- February 6, 1866 U.S. patent 52,484 — Shelburne Falls, Massachusetts
- November 19, 1867 U.S. patent 71,110 — Shelburne Falls, Massachusetts
- January 7, 1868 U.S. patent 73,152 — Cooperstown, New York
- February 4, 1868 U.S. patent 74,025 — Shelburne Falls, Massachusetts
- September 15, 1868 U.S. patent 82,192 — Shelburne Falls, Massachusetts
- January 4, 1870 U.S. patent 98,536 — Shelburne Falls, Massachusetts
- September 19, 1871 U.S. patent 119,212 — Shelburne Falls, Massachusetts
- October 24, 1871 U.S. patent 120,177 — Shelburne Falls, Massachusetts
