= Folkerts =

Folkerts is a surname. Notable people with the surname include:

- Brian Folkerts (born 1990), American football center
- Clayton Folkerts (1897–1964), American aircraft designer, whose designs include:
  - Folkerts SK-1
  - Folkerts SK-2
  - Folkerts SK-3
  - Folkerts Henderson Highwing
- David Folkerts-Landau (born 1949), German economist
- Knut Folkerts (born 1952), German terrorist and member of the Red Army Faction
- Ulrike Folkerts (born 1961), German actress

== See also ==
- Folkert, given name
