= Velie Monocoupe =

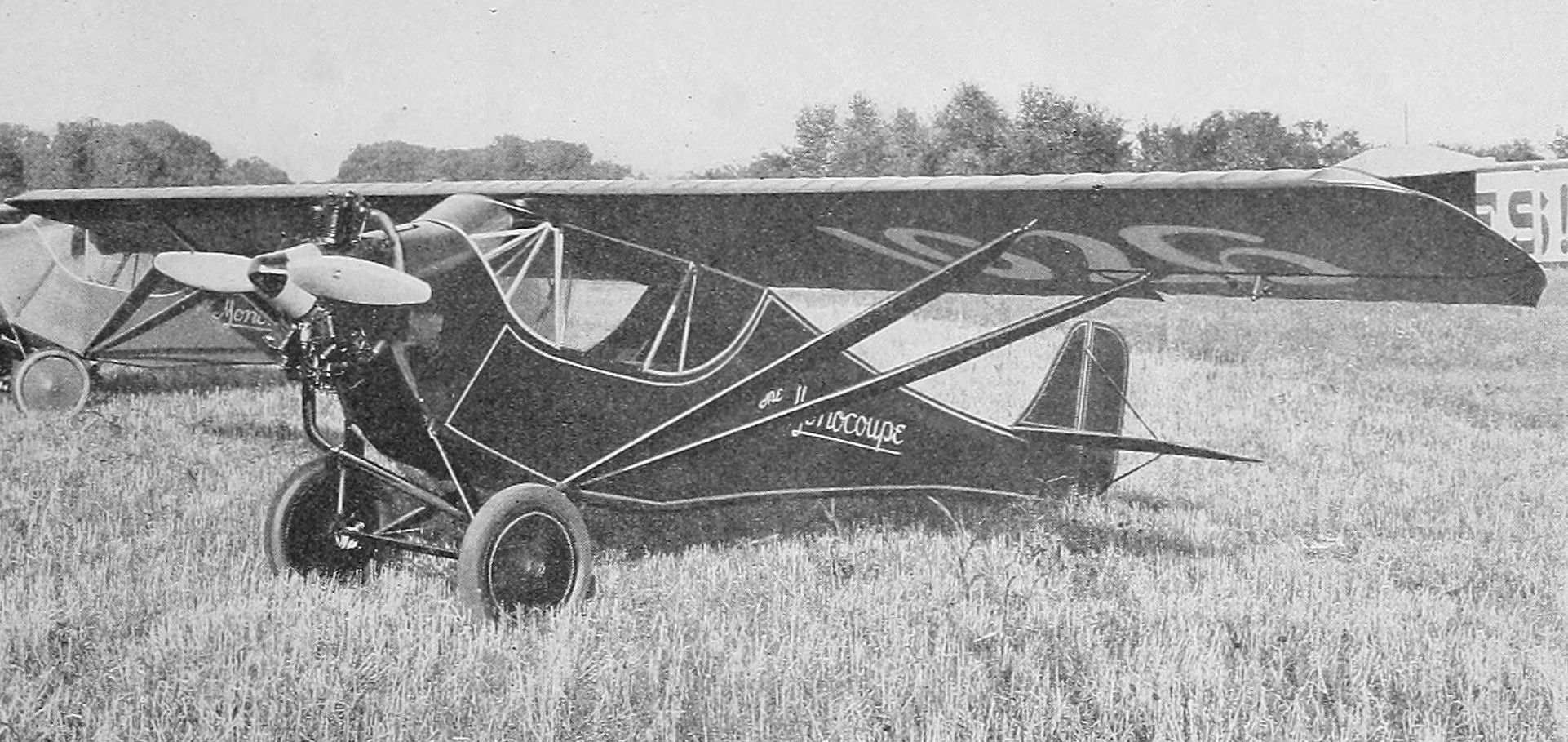

General information
- Type: Sport aircraft
- National origin: United States of America
- Manufacturer: Mono Aircraft Division of Velie Motor Corporation
- Designer: Clayton Folkerts, Don Luscombe, Jerome Lederer, Frederick Knack

History
- First flight: 1928
- Developed from: Monocoupe Model 22
- Developed into: Monocoupe Model 90

The Velie Monocoupe was an American general aviation aircraft manufactured from 1927 to 1929 by the Mono-Aircraft Corp, a division of Velie Motors Corporation (founded by Willard L. Velie, maternal grandson of John Deere).

== Design and development ==
The Velie Monocoupe was a wooden framed, doped fabric-covered monoplane, seating two people side-by-side in an enclosed cabin (hence the name).

This plane was conceived by pilot/businessman Don A. Luscombe, who developed a mock-up in 1926, and developed into a flying airplane by farmer-turned-plane-designer Clayton Folkerts. It was first produced by Central States Aircraft Corp in Davenport, Iowa, and was designed to be small, relatively inexpensive, quick and efficient (70-80 mph on 55 horsepower), and to have an enclosed cockpit for two people.

In all there were 350 Velie Monocoupes produced under the approved type certificate number 22. Upon W. L. Velie's death, his son had planned to continue production of the aircraft but he died within months of his father. The company, and design, survived, however.

== Company change ==
Upon the death of Velie's founder, in 1929 the Mono Aircraft Division was transferred to the holding company Allied Aircraft Co., which split the airplane division into Mono Aircraft Co. and Lambert Motors Co. Mono Aircraft would continue to produce the Monocoupe, in various versions—ultimately changing its name to Monocoupe Corp. The company producing the Monocoupe line changed ownership and location several times from 1926 to the early 1950s.

== Surviving aircraft ==
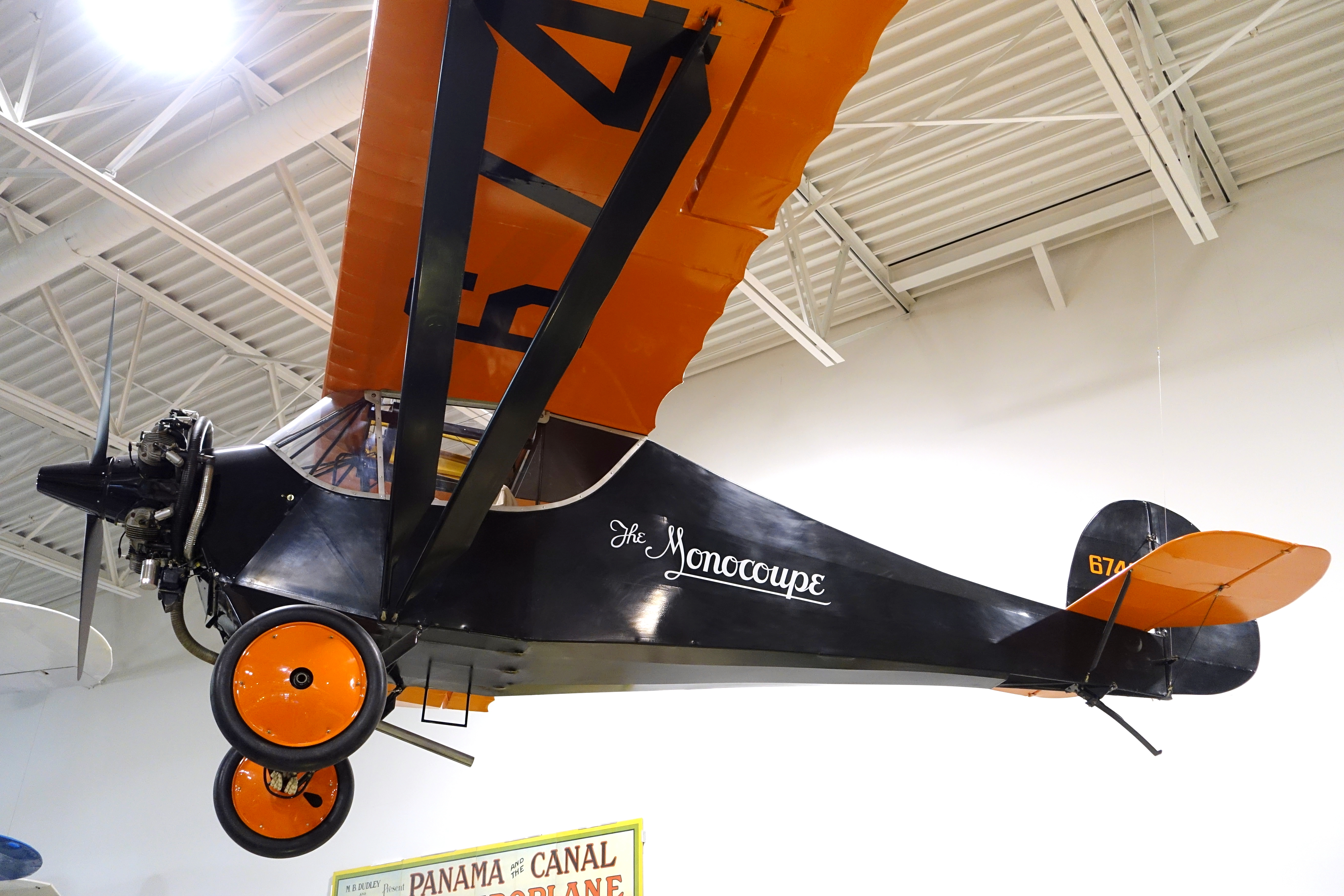
A Monocoupe 70 on display at the Hiller Aviation Museum

- 31 – Model 70 airworthy with the Kelch Aviation Museum in Brodhead, Wisconsin.
- 54 – Model 113 airworthy with T. D. Richards in Krum, Texas.
- 85 – Model 70 on static display at the Quad Cities International Airport in Moline, Illinois. It was flown in 1928 by female aviation pioneer Phoebe Omlie to set an altitude record at the airport.
- 132 – Model 70 airworthy with Kenneth R. Hetge of Tehachapi, California
- 133 – Model 70 on static display at the California Science Center in Los Angeles, California. It is on loan from the National Air and Space Museum.
- 134 – Model 70 airworthy at the Golden Age Air Museum in Bethel, Pennsylvania.
- 151 – Model 70 on static display at the Hiller Aviation Museum in San Carlos, California.
- 156 – Model 70 airworthy at the Western Antique Aeroplane & Automobile Museum in Hood River, Oregon.
- 247 – Model 113 on static display at the EAA Aviation Museum in Oshkosh, Wisconsin.
- 248 – Model 113 airworthy with Robert J. Coolbaugh of New Market, Virginia.
- 304 – Model 113 airworthy with Walter C. Bowe of Sonoma, California.
- 322 – Model 113 (original registration NC8955) under restoration to airworthiness at the Old Rhinebeck Aerodrome in Red Hook, New York.

== Specifications (Monocoupe Model 70) ==
General characteristics

- Crew: 2 (pilot, passenger)
- Length: 19 ft 9 in (6.0 m)
- Wingspan: 30 ft 0 in (9.1 m)
- Height: 6 ft 3 in (1.9 m)
- Powerplant: 1 × Velie five cylinder air-cooled radial

Performance

- Maximum speed: 100 mph (160 km/h, 87 kn)

== See also ==
- Monocoupe Aircraft
- Monocoupe Model 22
- Monocoupe 70
