= Velie Memorial Cup =

The Velie Memorial Cup, more commonly known as the Velie Cup, is an annual golf tournament held among several country clubs in the Quad-Cities area of Illinois and Iowa. The tournament derives its name from a silver loving cup offered to the Rock Island Arsenal Golf Club by members of the Velie family in memoriam to Willard L. Velie and son Willard L. Velie Jr. The senior Velie was founder and president of the Velie Motor Corporation and Willard Jr. was an executive. Both were members of the Arsenal Club; Willard Jr. was an accomplished golfer winning several amateur golf titles. Willard Sr. died in 1928 and Williard Jr. in March 1929 at the age of 32.

Velie Memorial Cup

The Velie Cup was to be awarded to the winner of a summer-long golf tournament featuring four private clubs of the tri-cities (as it was known then) in team competition. In a 7 June 1929 newspaper article, the Davenport Democrat and Leader commented that: “In serving as a memorial, the cup will incidentally be a stimulus to tri-city inter-club competition. Thus it will make for a more completely rounded season schedule of golf activities, heightening the interest and bringing the several clubs of the community into closer relationships.”

== Inaugural Tournament ==
The inaugural Velie Cup was played in 1929. Four competitions were held over the summer months with one played at each of the participating golf courses. Each contest consisted of two 18-hole rounds played on a single day. The four clubs separately fielded a roster of eight men. Two-ball Foursomes were played during the morning and singles competitions were held that afternoon. All matches were stroke play. The Velie Cup was awarded to the team that amassed the most points over the four competitions conducted under what was known as the intercollegiate system. (Note: Using the intercollegiate scoring format, each club ranked its players one through eight. For the two-ball matches, the number one and number two man of each club would be paired as would the three and four ranked and so on down through eight players. These pairing would compete against their counterparts on the other teams. For the singles matches, the number one player would compete against the number one player from each team, number two would compete against the 2nd ranked players and so on. The winner of each match received a point (or a half point for a tie) and a half point for each hole for which it had a lower score. For instance, if player group one scored as follows: Arsenal - 72, Davenport - 74, Short Hills – 74; and Black Hawk Hills – 76, the Arsenal Club player would receive one point for each player bested or three points. Davenport and Short Hills would each receive 1 ½ points for beating the Black Hawk Hills player and the tie. The Black Hawk Hills player would receive no points. For the second part of the scoring equation, if the Arsenal player bested the Davenport competitor on a total of four holes, Short Hills three holes and Black Hawk Hills five holes, he would receive a total of six points. The six points is added to the match win of three points for a total of nine points for the Arsenal player. The same calculations would apply to the Davenport, Short Hills and Black Hawk Hills players of that grouping.) The winner of the first Velie Cup event was Davenport Country Club. Dr. Paul Barton of the Davenport Club - an Iowa State Amateur Golf Champion and playing partner with tour stars Walter Hagen, Gene Sarazen and Horton Smith - captured medal honors shooting 73-75-70-77 (295) over four rounds of singles competition.

== Participating Clubs ==
The maiden tournament featured teams from four private country clubs – Rock Island Arsenal Golf Club, Davenport Country Club, Short Hills Country Club and Black Hawk Hills Country Club. The teams remained unchanged until 1943 when Oakwood Country Club replaced Black Hawk Hills. (Note: Black Hawk Hills Country Club was unable to field a team as a result of World War Two enlistments. In 1944, the course was acquired by the Rock Island County Forest Preserve and opened as a county-operated public golf course making it ineligible for play in Velie Cup competition. In 1948, Black Hawk Hills Golf Course was renamed Indian Bluff Golf Course.) In 1964, Mill Creek Country Club (now known as Pinnacle Country Club) was added to the tournament. Crow Valley Golf Club began participating in 1970. (Note: Heisman Trophy winner and Chicago Bears quarterback John Lujack was a founding director of Crow Valley Golf Club and played on many Davenport Country Club and Crow Valley Velie Cup teams.) The Rock Island Arsenal Golf Club – home to the Velie Cup; its name prominently engraved on the trophy's face – was taken over by the U.S. Army Family and Morale, Welfare and Recreation, Directorate in 2010 and became a public facility. No longer a private course, the renamed Arsenal Island Golf Course became ineligible to participate in the tournament. (Note: The Arsenal Island Golf Course closed in September of 2018 and its clubhouse contents were liquidated. Opened in 1897, the Arsenal Island Golf Course was the 2nd oldest golf course in Illinois and one of the oldest continually operating courses in the nation.) In 2016, Geneva Golf and Country Club joined the Velie Cup competition. Davenport Country Club - winner of the very first Velie Cup but not having won since 1948 - stopped competing in 2021 leaving Short Hills as the only remaining club from the inaugural tournament still participating. While more successful than Davenport, Crow Valley Golf Club stopped participating in 2022 having won the Velie Cup 23 times. The Velie Cup added Valley View Club from Cambridge IL, in 2025 to bring the number of clubs participating to five.

== The Quad-Cities Most Coveted Trophy ==
The Velie Cup quickly turned into the most sought-after prize by golfers of the Quad-Cities. During the 1940s and 1950s, the tournament attracted as many as 3,000 spectators with large galleries following the lead groups. Newspapers from as far away as Chicago reported on the tournament; local publications extensively covered each match. Prior to the appearance of the Quad Cities Open (now the John Deere Classic) in 1971, the Velie Cup was the biggest golf event of the year.

The clubs fielded top scratch and low handicap golfers (6-handicap and under) for the competition. Heated arguments would often accompany team selection. It wasn't unknown for a player to quit a club if not selected for the team. A source of pride, many former players’ obituaries include mention of their Velie Cup participation. Because of its success, the Velie Cup was used as a model for other interclub competitions around the country.

== Tournament Format ==
Over the years, the structure of the Velie Cup has changed dramatically. For the first 35 years, the tournament format remained relatively stable. Two significant changes were made during this period, the first occurring in 1948 when the two-ball foursome was dropped in favor of all single matches. The second occurred in 1958 when the clubs adapted the Nassau scoring system. It was thought that the intercollegiate system (referred to by the press at the time as the "Velie Cup scoring system") too often produced large (and uncompetitive) point spreads for matches between golfers of differing abilities causing the Arsenal and Davenport clubs to struggle against Oakwood and Short Hills.

The change to the Nassau system was well received at first by the clubs. However, by 1961, Velie Cup golfers were asked to complete a questionnaire designed to determine whether the golfers were satisfied with the series format including the scoring system. Apparently, there was enough agitation for change and, as a result, the 1964 competition featured a series of major format modifications. The Nassau system was replaced by stroke play. The number of rounds were reduced from four to three. Finally, each club would enter 15-man squads of which the low 12 scores would count towards the series total. Despite adapting the most consequential changes to the Velie Cup format since the beginning of the series 35 years earlier, 1964 marked only the beginning of a period of almost annual format modifications – eight substantial alterations over the next 16 years. Stroke play, Nassau, best ball, alternate ball, best-nine and variations of those formats were tried. (Note: 1964-1966 - medal; 1967 - Nassau; 1968-1970 - best ball; 1971 - round one best ball, round two best-nine, round three alternate ball; 1972-1974 eight players best ball and four players medal; 1975-1976 - best ball; 1977-1978 - eight players best ball and four players medal; and 1979 - best ball.) In 1976, each club's pro was allowed to play; this novelty only lasting one year. By the 52nd annual in 1980, the tournament had been jammed into one weekend a year with 18 holes of best-ball twosomes on Saturday and 18 holes of stroke play on Sunday. In subsequent years, further format changes, albeit less-frequent, were introduced to keep interest in the event.

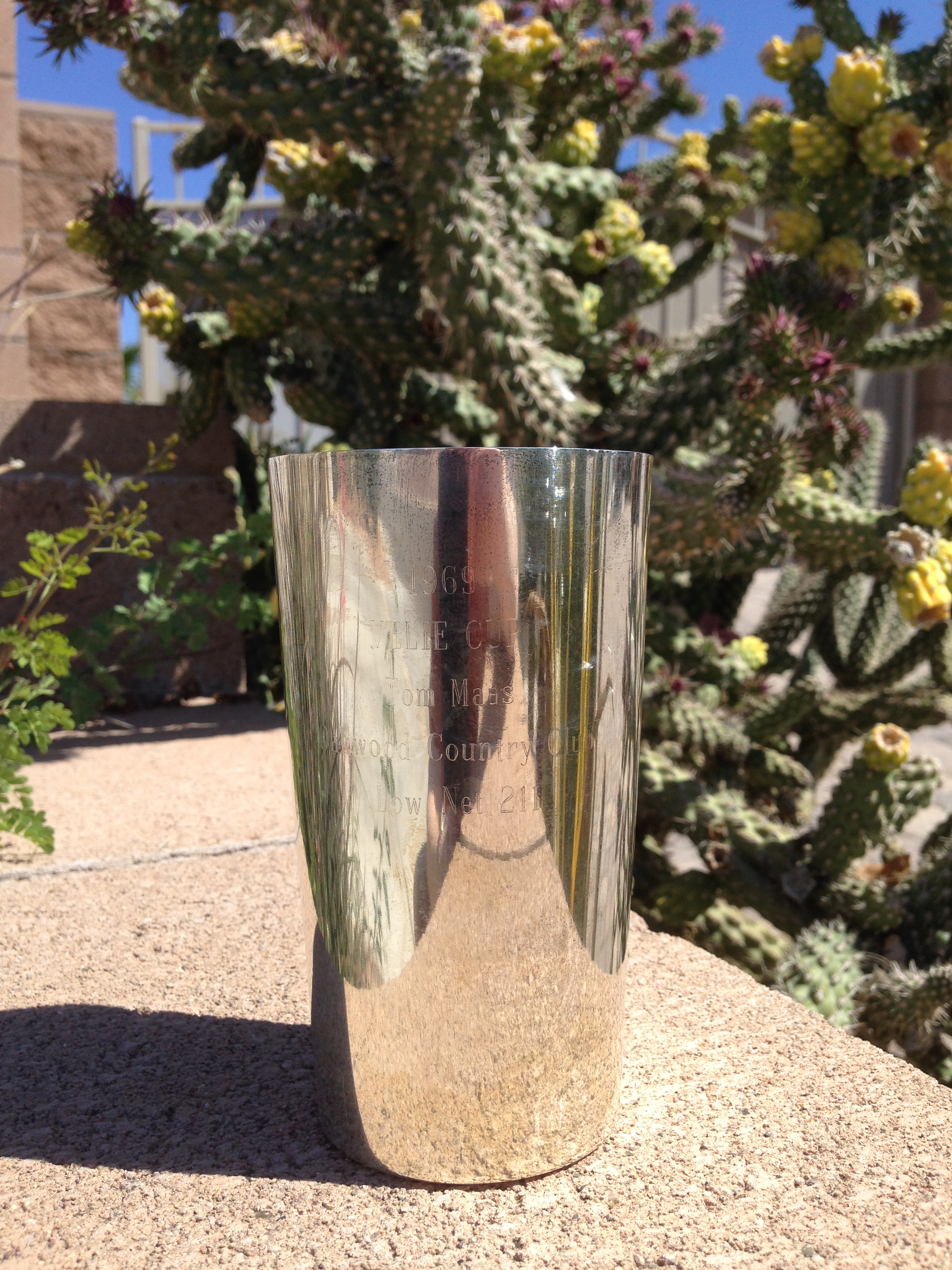
1969 Velie Silver Cup. Presented for Individual Low Score to Tom Maas

== Individual Honors ==
While primarily a team competition, for much of Velie Cup history, individual efforts were also recognized. Beginning in 1936, the top point-earner for each team as well as the stroke play medalist for the entire series were recipients of a sterling silver cup. However, this tradition ended sometime in the early 1970s as the tournament format moved away from stroke play; the exact year is unclear from newspaper accounts.

In addition, beginning in 1961, Velie Cup golfers under the age of 24 competed for the Dick Smith Memorial Trophy which was awarded to the player with the low medal score for the series. Dave Gross of the Davenport Club was the first recipient of the Dick Smith trophy besting future PGA touring professional and Western Open champion Jim Jamieson of Short Hills by two strokes. As with the individual honors, this too is no longer awarded. (Note: Richart T. Smith was a young member of the Davenport Country Club and a highly-touted prospect for the PGA tour. A 1960 NCAA First Team All-American as a sophomore at North Texas State College and captain of the golf team which included future PGA tour winner Bobby Greenwood, Smith was killed at the age of 21 in a car accident in Denton Texas on 23 April 1961.)

== Decline ==
By the 1980s, the Velie Cup was in decline. Interest in the event had been slowly fading for years. Where once crowds of 300-400 people would follow the club champions who teed off last on the final day, galleries during the 1970s diminished to a handful of spectators. Most dismissed spectator indifference as a result of the proliferation of televised golf. People were choosing to watch professionals on television rather than amateurs at the course. However, as the galleries disappeared, so did press coverage. This did not go unnoticed by the press itself with Forrest Kilmer, editor of the Quad Cities Times writing in 1983 that the Velie Cup "is one of the most prestigious local events and deserves better coverage than we give it.". Instead of the usual photo spreads and articles breaking down each round as in past years, Velie Cup results were now buried on the scoreboard page.

Lacking spectators and press coverage, the Velie Cup still remained a highly competitive event with teams taking the tournament as seriously as ever. Yet, for the 1980 series, team committees were pressed to find 12 players for many of the clubs. A number of players were just not as interested in the event as they once were. The Arsenal Golf Club pro at the time offered that some of the top golfers "didn't want to break up their weekend foursomes." Oakwood and Short Hills had dominated the Velie Cup during the 30 years since 1950 and that, in part, led organizers to constantly change the format in an effort to bring parity to the clubs and to keep interest in the tournament from eroding. However, these efforts had unintended consequences as the traditional aspects of the event were diminished and long-time participants stopped playing. This left younger players with little or no connection to old rivalries and enthusiasms to take over the club rosters. Still others believed that reducing the tournament to a single weekend from the former three-weekend event diminished prestige and eliminated the excitement that built over the series. By the 70th edition, the Velie Cup - once the showcase of the area's best golfing talent - was drawing little attention outside of the participating clubs.

In more recent years, the ever-increasing number of cheaper and less time-consuming sporting alternatives have led to the loss of interest in golf in general which has impacted nearly all competitive golf events with the Velie Cup not an exception.

== Tradition Endures ==
While the Velie Cup is no longer the large gallery-drawing event that it once was, the tournament still continues today. Once a summer-long event, the Velie Cup winner is settled over one weekend. As of 2017, the Velie Cup format consists of 12 members per team playing two-man best ball with the best five scores counted each day for each club. Short Hills Country Club (Illinois), Oakwood Country Club (Illinois), Pinnacle Country Club (Illinois), and Geneva Golf and Country Club (Iowa) currently compete for the Velie Cup.

In an era where declining interest in competitive golf has caused many grand tournaments of the past to disappear, it is a notable achievement that the Velie Cup is still being played after more than 90 years.

== Winners ==
Year	Champion	Year	Champion
1929	Davenport Country Club (1)	1980	Crow Valley Golf Club (3)
1930	Davenport Country Club (2)	1981	Oakwood Country Club (16)
1931	Davenport Country Club (3)	1982	Crow Valley Golf Club (4)
1932	Rock Island Arsenal Golf Club (1)	1983	Crow Valley Golf Club (5)
1933	Short Hills Country Club (1)	1984	Crow Valley Golf Club (6)
1934	Short Hills Country Club (2)	1985	Crow Valley Golf Club (7)
1935	Black Hawk Hills Country Club (1)	1986	Oakwood Country Club (17)
1936	Short Hills Country Club (3)	1987	Crow Valley Golf Club (8)
1937	Davenport Country Club (4)	1988	Oakwood Country Club (18)
1938	Davenport Country Club (5)	1989	Crow Valley Golf Club (9)
1939	Short Hills Country Club (4)	1990	Crow Valley Golf Club (10)
1940	Short Hills Country Club (5)	1991	Crow Valley Golf Club (11)
1941	Short Hills Country Club (6)	1992	Pinnacle Country Club (1)
1942	Short Hills Country Club (7)	1993	Crow Valley Golf Club (12)
1943	Davenport Country Club (6)	1994	Crow Valley Golf Club (13)
1944	Short Hills Country Club (8)	1995	Tie - Crow Valley (14)/Oakwood (19)
1945	Short Hills Country Club (9)	1996	Crow Valley Golf Club (15)
1946	Short Hills Country Club (10)	1997	Crow Valley Golf Club (16)
1947	Short Hills Country Club (11)	1998	Short Hills Country Club (22)
1948	Davenport Country Club (7)	1999	Crow Valley Golf Club (17)
1949	Short Hills Country Club (12)	2000	Short Hills Country Club (23)
1950	Oakwood Country Club (1)	2001	Pinnacle Country Club (2)
1951	Oakwood Country Club (2)	2002	Crow Valley Golf Club (18)
1952	Oakwood Country Club (3)	2003	Crow Valley Golf Club (19)
1953	Oakwood Country Club (4)	2004	Tie - Oakwood (20)/Short Hills (24)
1954	Oakwood Country Club (5)	2005	Crow Valley Golf Club (20)
1955	Short Hills Country Club (13)	2006	Short Hills Country Club (25)
1956	Oakwood Country Club (6)	2007	Crow Valley Golf Club (21)
1957	Oakwood Country Club (7)	2008	Crow Valley Golf Club (22)
1958	Short Hills Country Club (14)	2009	Oakwood Country Club (21)
1959	Oakwood Country Club (8)	2010	Pinnacle Country Club (3)
1960	Short Hills Country Club (15)	2011	Short Hills Country Club (26)
1961	Short Hills Country Club (16)	2012	Short Hills Country Club (27)
1962	Rock Island Arsenal Golf Club (2)	2013	Crow Valley Golf Club (23)
1963	Short Hills Country Club (17)	2014	Short Hills Country Club (28)
1964	Oakwood Country Club (9)	2015	Short Hills Country Club (29)
1965	Rock Island Arsenal Golf Club (3)	2016	Short Hills Country Club (30)
1966	Rock Island Arsenal Golf Club (4)	2017	Short Hills Country Club (31)
1967	Rock Island Arsenal Golf Club (5)	2018	Short Hills Country Club (32)
1968	Oakwood Country Club (10)	2019	Not contested due to inclement weather
1969	Oakwood Country Club (11)	2020	Not contested due to COVID-19
1970	Crow Valley Golf Club (1)	2021	Oakwood Country Club (22)
1971	Short Hills Country Club (18)	2022	Short Hills Country Club (33)
1972	Short Hills Country Club (19)	2023	Oakwood Country Club (23)
1973	Short Hills Country Club (20)	2024	Oakwood Country Club (24)
1974	Short Hills Country Club (21)	2025	
1975	Oakwood Country Club (12)	2026	
1976	Oakwood Country Club (13)	2027	
1977	Oakwood Country Club (14)	2028	
1978	Oakwood Country Club (15)	2029	
1979	Crow Valley Golf Club (2)	2030	
