= Monocoupe Model 22 =

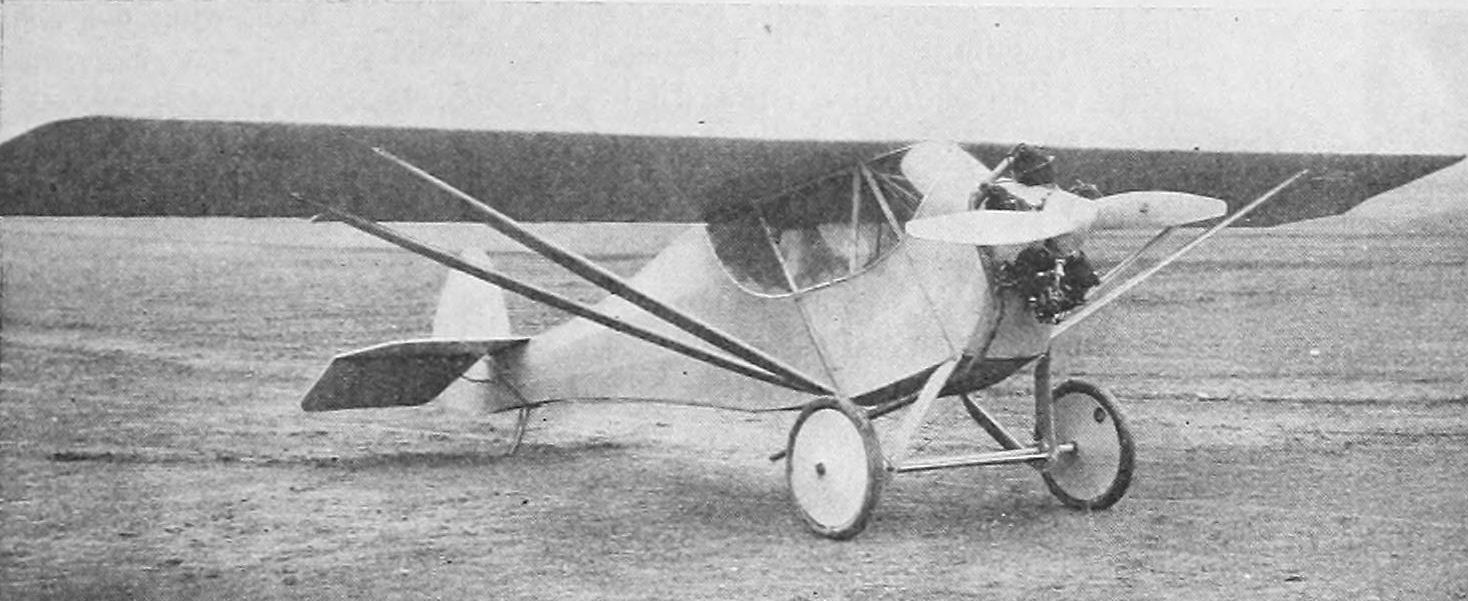
- Central States Monocoupe

General information
- Type: Sport aircraft
- National origin: United States of America
- Manufacturer: Central States Aircraft Company, Mono Aircraft Division of Velie Motor Corporation
- Designer: Clayton Folkerts, Don Luscome, Jerome Lederer, Frederick Knack.
- Number built: 20

History
- Introduction date: Davenport, Iowa
- First flight: 1 April 1927

The Central States Aircraft Model 22, Velie Monocoupe, or Monocoupe Model 22 was the first in a series of small, high-performance high-wing monoplanes from Monocoupe Aircraft.

== Development ==
The Monocooupe model 22 was drawn up by Clayton Folkerts to Luscombe's design criteria.

== Design ==
The Model 22 was a high-wing conventional geared aircraft with side by side seating. The prototype was powered by a 60 hp Detroit air-cat engine. Some were installed with Anzani engines.

== Operational history ==
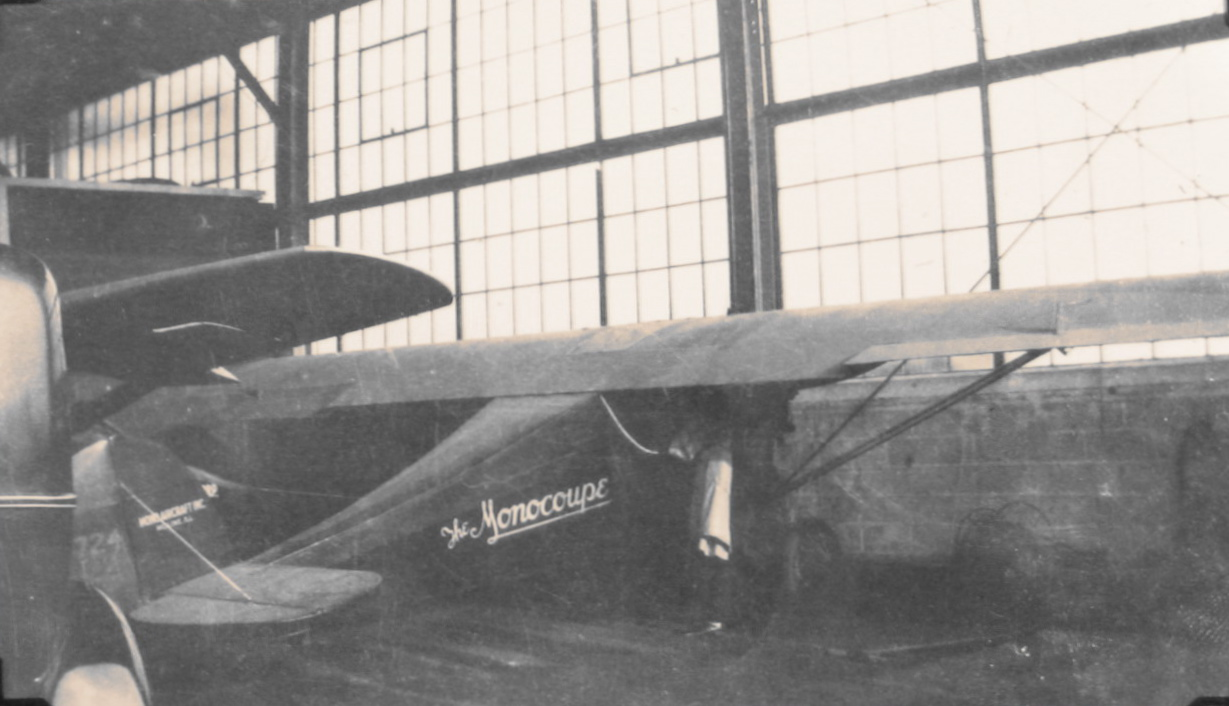
A later model 90 with an upgraded engine

The prototype monocoupe was first flown on 1 April 1927. The certified version of the Model 22 was approved in January 1928. By the time of certification, the Velie company had bought Central States Aircraft, switching production of the Model 22 with the air-cat engine to the Model 70 with a Velie M-5. Approximately 20 Model 22's were built.

== Variants ==
- Model 70 - The production successor with a Velie M-5 engine

== Specifications (Monocoupe Model 22) ==
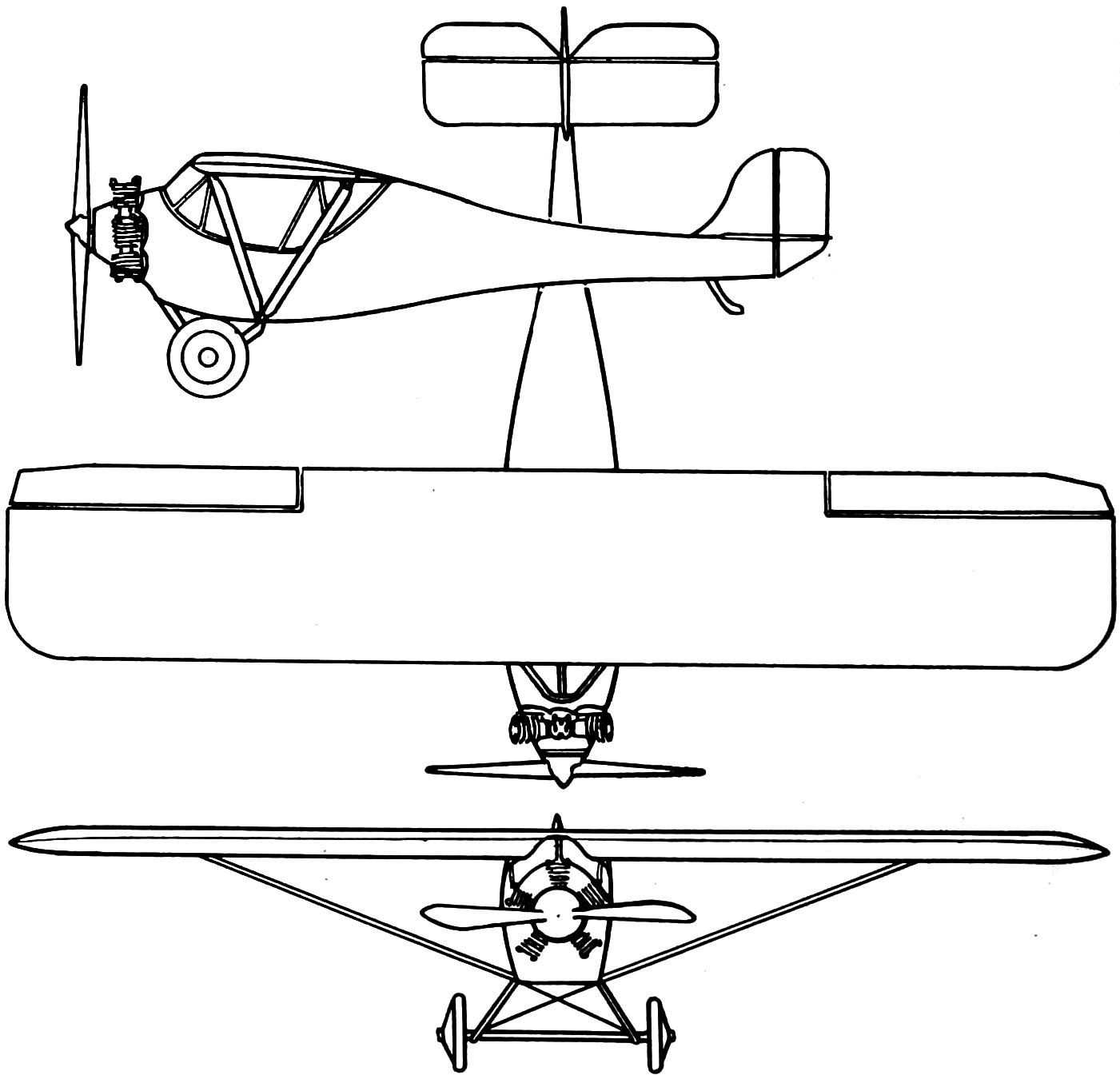
Central States Monocoupe 3-view drawing from Aero Digest December 1927

Data from Wings of Yesteryear

General characteristics

- Capacity: 2
- Length: 19 ft 9 in (6.02 m)
- Height: 6 ft 3 in (1.91 m)
- Empty weight: 795 lb (361 kg)
- Powerplant: 1 × Detroit Air Cat 5 cylinder radial, 60 hp (45 kW)

Performance
