= Monocoupe 90 =

Light cabin airplane

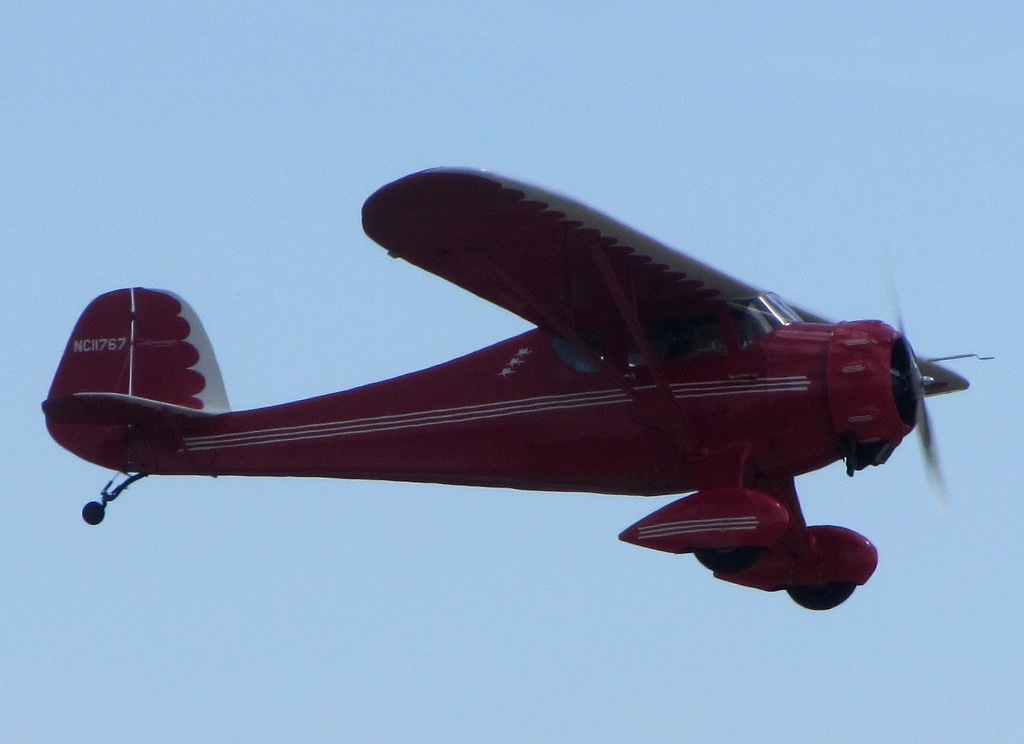
- Monocoupe 90A

General information
- Type: Light Trainer and Racer
- Manufacturer: Monocoupe Aircraft
- Designer: Don A. Luscombe
- Primary users: Civil Aviation USAAF
- Number built: 324 (all models)

History
- Introduction date: 1928
- First flight: April 1, 1927

The Monocoupe 90 was a two-seat, light cabin airplane built by Donald A. Luscombe for Monocoupe Aircraft. The first Monocoupe (Model 5) was built in an abandoned church in Davenport, Iowa, and first flew on April 1, 1927. Various models were in production until the late 1940s.

== Development ==
The Monocoupes were side-by-side two-seat lightplanes of mixed wood and steel-tube basic construction with fabric covering. A braced high-wing monoplane with fixed tailskid landing gear, and the reverse curve rear fuselage lines that were to become one of the signature identifier features of the Monocoupes. The fuselage framework was built up of welded steel tubing in a rigid, triangular-framed Warren truss form for the side panel structures, heavily faired to shape with dural metal sheet formers and wooden fairing strips. The wings were built up of solid spruce spars with wing ribs of basswood webs and spruce cap-strips. The leading edges were covered with dural metal sheet and the entire framework was covered in fabric.

The aircraft was powered originally by either a 60 hp (45 kW) Anzani engine or the unsuccessful 65 hp (48 kW) Detroit Air-Cat radial. The Model 22 was the first light aircraft awarded a type certificate (number 22) and in 1930 it was fitted with the Velie M-5 62 hp (46 kW) five-cylinder radial engine to become the Model 70.

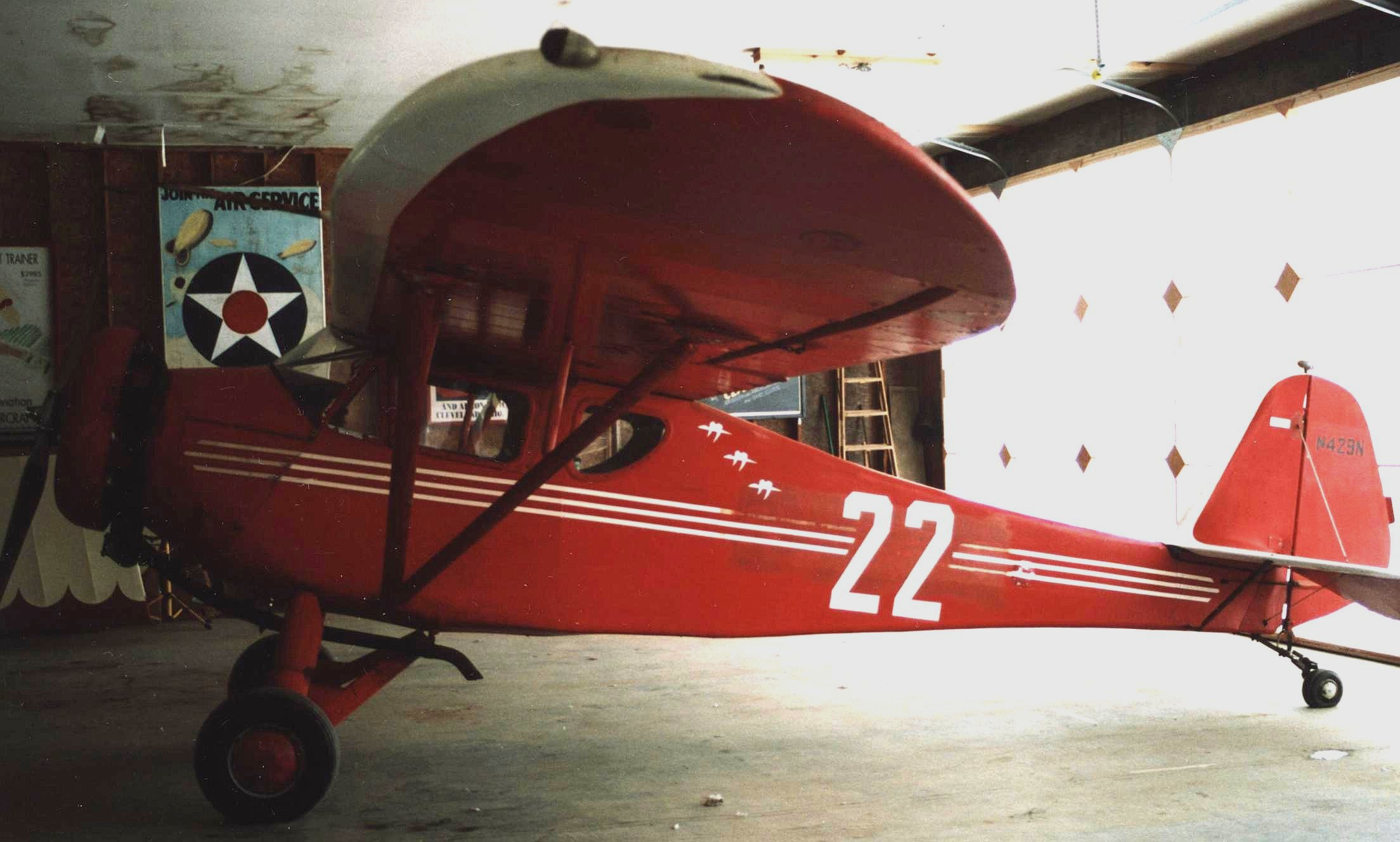
1932-built Monocoupe 90 at Old Rhinebeck Aerodrome in 2005

In 1930 Monocoupe introduced the Model 90 with refined lines and a fuselage that was slightly longer and wider, this being sold in Model 90 and Model 90A versions with a 90 hp (67 kW) Lambert R-266 radial engine. The Monocoupe 90 DeLuxe introduced trailing edge flaps, wheel speed fairings and an improved engine cowling. The Model 90AF was fitted with a 115 hp (86 kW) Franklin engine. The Model 90AL had Avco Lycoming engines. The Model 90J was introduced in 1930 with a 90 hp (67 kW) Warner Scarab Jr engine.

The final two high performance Monocoupe models developed from the Model 90 were the Model 110 with a 110 hp (82 kW) Warner Scarab, and the Model 125 with a 125 hp (93 kW) Kinner B-5 engine. The Monocoupe 110 Special was a clipped wing racing aircraft. The Monocoupe Model 70V of 1932, had the low-powered 65 hp (48-kW) Velie M-5 engine reintroduced to provide more economical operation at the cost of a fall in performance.

In 1941 Monocoupe combined with three other companies to form Universal Molded Products Corp. 20 Model 90AFs were bought by the USAAF, who designated them the Universal L-7, for transfer to the Free French Forces. One was lost during delivery.

Aircraft production halted during World War II, resuming briefly in 1948-1950 under the name Monocoupe Airplane and Engine Corporation.

The last of this line of two-seat aircraft was the Monocoupe D-145 of 1934.

== Variants ==
Monocoupe Model 5
Prototype
Monocoupe Model 22

60 hp (45 kW) Anzani engine or 65 hp (48 kW) Detroit Air Cat radial.
Monocoupe Model 70

Velie M-5 62 hp (46 kW) five-cylinder radial engine

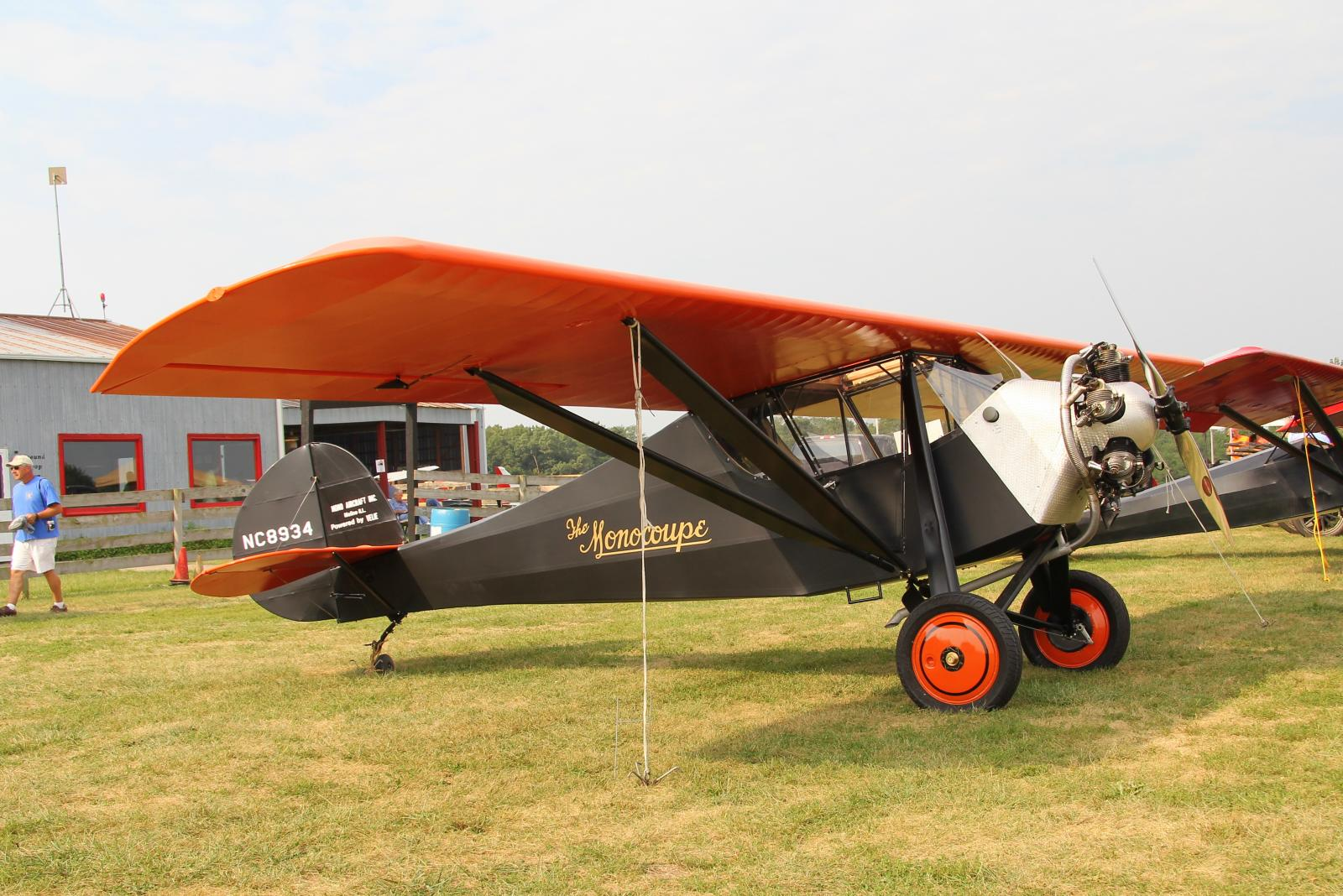
Monocoupe 113

Monocoupe Model 113
Revised landing gear and a number of improvements
Monocoupe Monoprep
Dedicated trainer similar to the Monocoupe 113
Monocoupe Monosport Model 1
Air racing model, had a 110 hp (82 kW) Warner Scarab seven-cylinder radial engine
Monocoupe Monosport Model 2
Air racing model, had a 100 hp (75 kW) Kinner K-5 radial engine

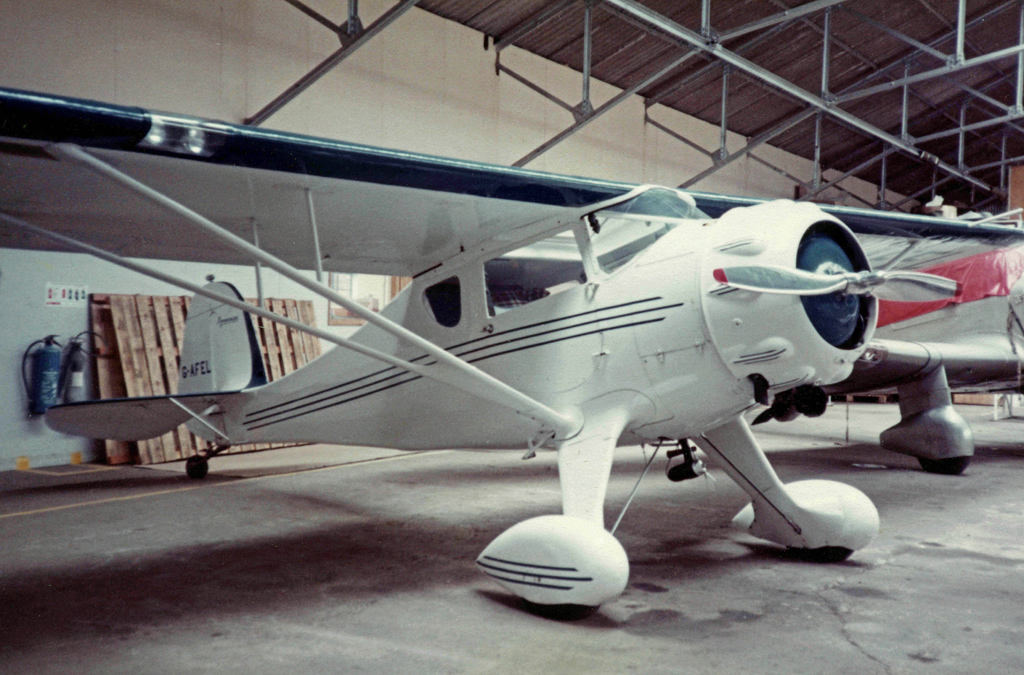
Monocoupe 90A of 1937 at Biggin Hill Airport, England in September 1982

Monocoupe Model 90
Longer wider fuselage
Monocoupe Model 90A
90 hp (67 kW) Lambert R-266 radial engine
Monocoupe 90 DeLuxe
Trailing edge flaps, wheel speed fairings and an improved engine cowling
Monocoupe Model 90AF
115 hp (86 kW) Franklin engine
Monocoupe Model 90AL
Avco Lycoming engine

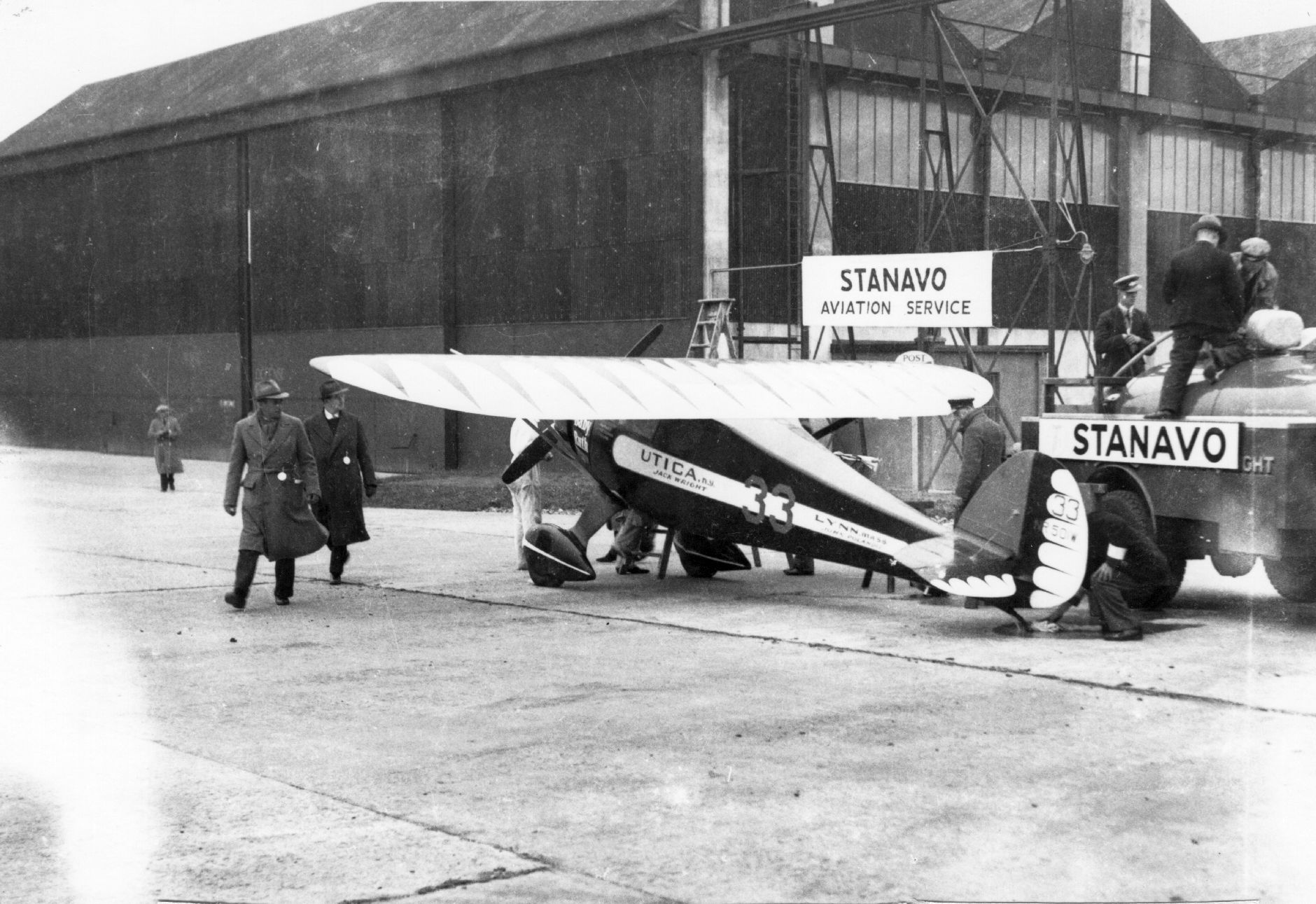
Monocoupe D-145

Monocoupe Model 90AW
145 hp (108 kW) Warner engine, wing span 32 ft (9.8 m), length 20 ft 5.75 in (6.24 m).
Monocoupe Model 110
110 hp (82 kW) Warner Scarab engine
Monocoupe Model 110 Special

Racing model, 110 hp (82 kW) Warner Scarab engine, shorter span
Monocoupe Model 125
125 hp (93 kW) Kinner B-5 engine
Universal L-7
Military version of the Model 90AF.
Monocoupe D-145
145 hp (108 kW) Warner Super Scarab engine.

== Operators ==
The majority of the Monocoupe 90s to be built were sold to and flown by private pilot owners.

Spain

- Spanish Republican Air Force - Monocoupe 90 A

France

- Free French Forces, later Armée de l'Air - Monocoupe 90 AF

19 delivered early 1943 by sea to Abu Sweir, Egypt, to be reassembled by RAF MU 109. Main delivery to create a flying school (GE 11) in Rayack, Syria, opening September 1, 1943. The Monocoupe 90 was too sensitive to be used for basic training and many accidents occurred until school disbandment January 4, 1944. One aircraft survived the war and remained on the French civil register until written-off in 1962. 5 aircraft delivered to Madagascar in early September 1943 and operated by Escadrille d'Avions Sanitaires et de Liaison (EASL = Liaison and Medical Flight) based at Ivato. EASL became Escadrille de Liaison et de Commandement (ELC) on January 1, 1944, then SAL-51 and last SLA-50. The last two Monocoupes were sold to local aéro-club in 1948.

== Specifications (Model 90A) ==
Data from Specifications of American Airplanes

General characteristics

- Crew: 1
- Capacity: 1 passenger
- Length: 20 ft 5 3/4 in (6.242 m)
- Wingspan: 32 ft 0 in (9.75 m)
- Height: 6 ft 9 3/4 in (2.076 m)
- Wing area: 134.5 sq ft (12.50 m^{2})
- Empty weight: 967 lb (439 kg)
- Gross weight: 1,610 lb (730 kg)
- Fuel capacity: 28 US gal (23 imp gal; 110 L)
- Powerplant: 1 × Lambert R-266 radial engine, 90 hp (67 kW)

Performance

- Maximum speed: 130 mph (210 km/h, 110 kn) at sea level
- Cruise speed: 110 mph (180 km/h, 96 kn)
- Stall speed: 40 mph (64 km/h, 35 kn)
- Range: 600 mi (970 km, 520 nmi)
- Service ceiling: 16,000 ft (4,900 m)
- Rate of climb: 850 ft/min (4.3 m/s)

== See also ==
Related development

- Mullicoupe

Aircraft of comparable role, configuration, and era

- Cessna Airmaster
- Fairchild 24
- Howard DGA-6 Mister Mulligan
- Howard DGA-15
- Potez 36
- Stinson Reliant
- Taylorcraft B
- Velie Monocoupe
- Waco Standard Cabin series
