= Karl Krüger =

German intelligence source for British, interwar period

Karl Krüger (born 1874, believed killed 1939 or later) was a former German naval engineer who provided intelligence about German ships to the British during World War I and World War II. His identification code was TR/016. Krüger was a particularly valuable source on German losses from the Battle of Jutland, and on the development of U-boats. In approximately 1939, he was betrayed by a German agent within MI6; he failed to show for a meeting in August of that year, and it is presumed he was executed by the Nazis. His British contacts initially believed he was a Dutchman. He was connected to the British through the embassy at The Hague; he may have been identified to the Germans by an embassy employee named Folkert van Koutrik, who "was on the Abwehr's payroll."
