= Folkert =

Folkert is a masculine given name of Dutch origin.

== People with the given name ==
- Folkert de Jong (born 1972), Dutch artist
- Folkert Idsinga (born 1971), Dutch tax lawyer and politician
- Folkert Meeuw (born 1946), German former swimmer
- Folkert Posthuma (1874–1943), Dutch politician
- Folkert Thiadens, Dutch politician
- Folkert van Koutrik (1912–1988), Dutch spy
- Folkert Velten (born 1964), Dutch former professional football player and coach

== See also ==
- Folkerts, surname
- Folkert Mound Group
