= Willard Lamb Velie =

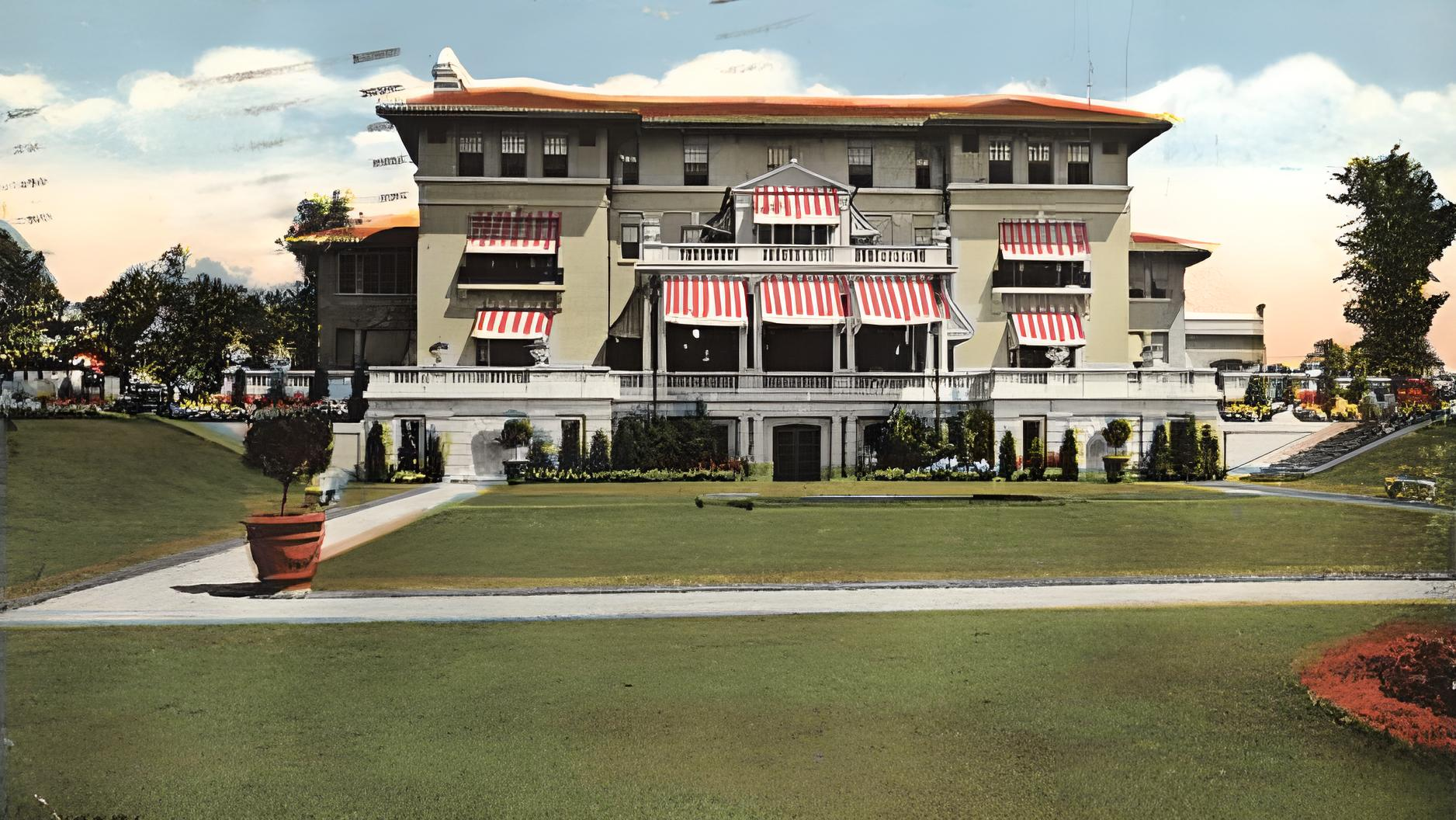
- Villa Velie, residence of Mr. Willard Lamb Velie in Moline, Illinois, 1921
- Born: 1866; Moline, Illinois, US
- Died: September 24, 1928 (aged 61–62); Moline, Illinois, US
- Resting place: Riverside Cemetery; 41.50780°N 90.49190°W
- Education: Yale University
- Occupation: President/Founder of Velie Motors Corporation
- Known for: Velie Motorcar; Velie Monocoupe
- Spouse: Annie Flowerree
- Children: 2

Willard Lamb Velie (1866 – October 24, 1928) was a businessman based in Moline, Illinois. He was an executive at Deere & Company before starting his own companies, which grew to become Velie Motor Company. He developed advanced engines for automobiles and airplanes.

== Biography ==
=== Early life and education ===
W. L. Velie was born in Moline, Illinois. He was the third of five children born to Stephen H. Velie and Emma Deere, the daughter of John Deere. His uncle was architect Merton Yale Cady, husband of Alice Deere. Stephen Velie had moved to Rock Island, Illinois to work for the C. C. Webber & Company. In 1863, he entered into a partnership with his father-in-law, and when the company was incorporated, he was elected to the offices of secretary and treasurer. W. L. Velie had two older brothers, a younger brother who died as an infant and a sister. He graduated from Phillips Academy in Andover, Massachusetts in 1885 and Yale University in 1888. After graduation he set out for Montana.

=== Deere & Company ===
In 1890, Velie returned to Moline and began working at Deere & Company as a clerk. After a year, he became a sales manager. When his father died in 1895 W.L. replaced him as the corporate secretary and a member of the board. In 1902, Velie founded his first company, the Velie Carriage Company of Moline. It manufactured buggies, carriages, surreys, driving wagons, and spring wagons called the "Wrought Iron Line" of vehicles. In 1907 alone, the company made 21,000 buggies and surreys. When his cousin William Butterworth became president of Deere & Company in 1908, Velie was elected vice-president. Three years later he became the first chairman of the executive committee when it was formed. At the same time he founded the Velie Engineering Company, which produced gas, steam and electric motors and engines, plus automobile accessories and motor trucks. In 1916, he merged his two companies and began making tractors. Their first was the Velie Biltwel 12-24, a four-cylinder tractor powered by a Velie-built engine. While this appeared to be a conflict of interest Velie was a strong supporter of Deere & Company’s acquisition or development of a tractor. For the most part, Velie’s product lines and Deere’s lines remained separate. He and Butterworth were in disagreement, however, about the company’s operation and so Velie resigned his executive committee positions in 1918 and severed all ties with the company in 1921.

=== Velie Motor Corporation ===
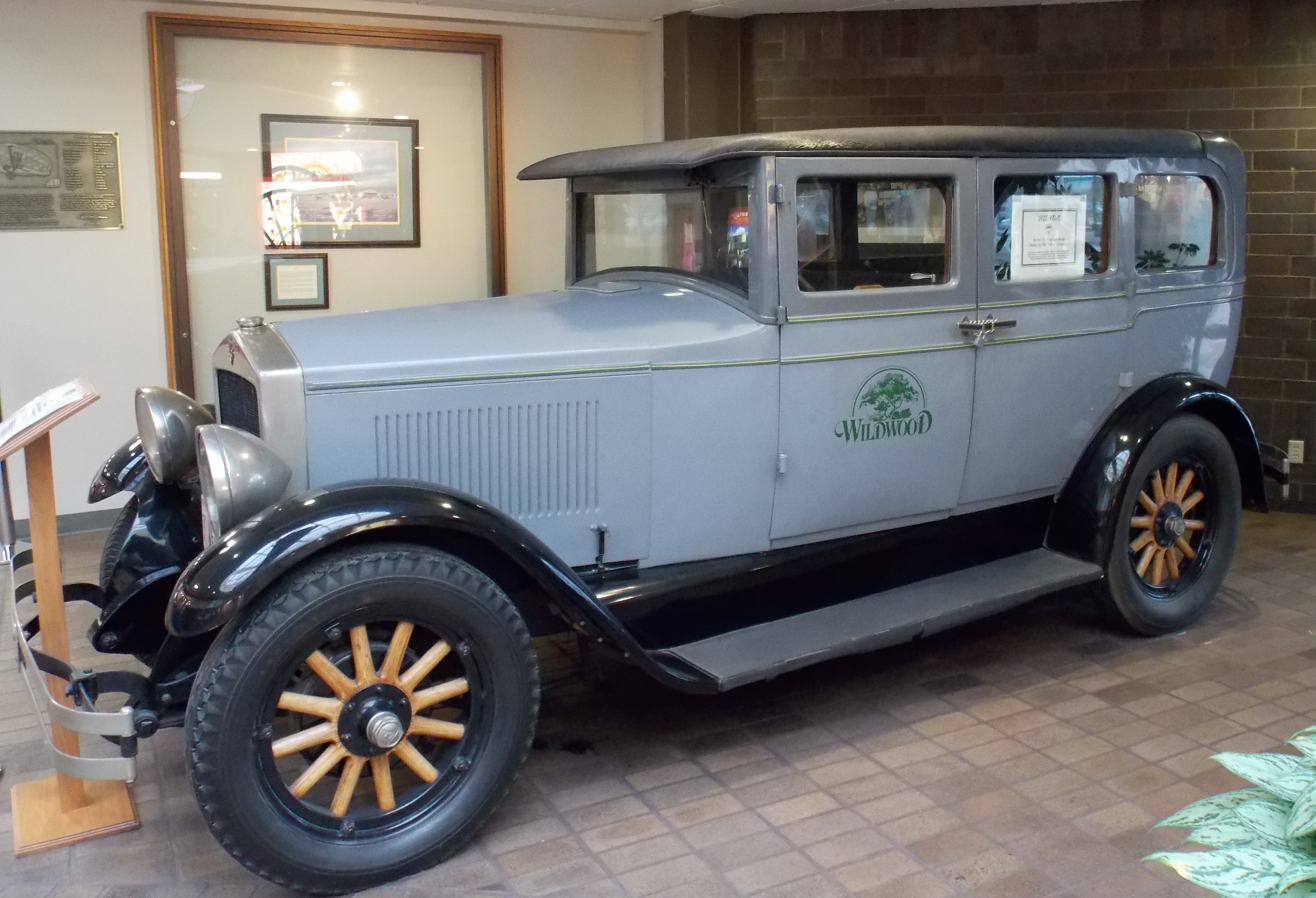
1927 Velie Model 50 Standard Sedan

While still at Deere & Company, W.L Velie incorporated the Velie Motor Vehicle Company in 1908. While he kept his tractor lines separate from the Deere line, his automobiles were marketed through Deere’s branch houses. When he merged his companies in 1916, he formed the Velie Motor Company. The products produced by the company came to be known for their quality at a reasonable price. By 1912, the company’s stock was valued at $1.5 million and four years later it was worth $2 million. Between 1913 and 1915, the Velie factory was turning out an average of 30 cars a day. By 1920, the buggy business was phased out and automobile production peaked at 9,000. Estimates of how many motor vehicles Velie produced in the two decades the factory was in operation range between 75,000 to 300,000. Velie was not the only person in the Tri-Cities, now known as the Quad Cities, who was building automobiles. At one point in the early 20th century, there were ten different makes being produced in the area. Velie was the most successful. The U.S. Navy chose the Velie engine along with seven others as the best automobile motors for adaptation to military use. Other winners included the Brewster, Duesenberg, Fiat, Hispano-Suiza, Isotta Fraschini, Marmon and Packard. Between 1916 and 1920, the company also produced the Biltwel 12-25" tractor, which was powered by a Velie engine.

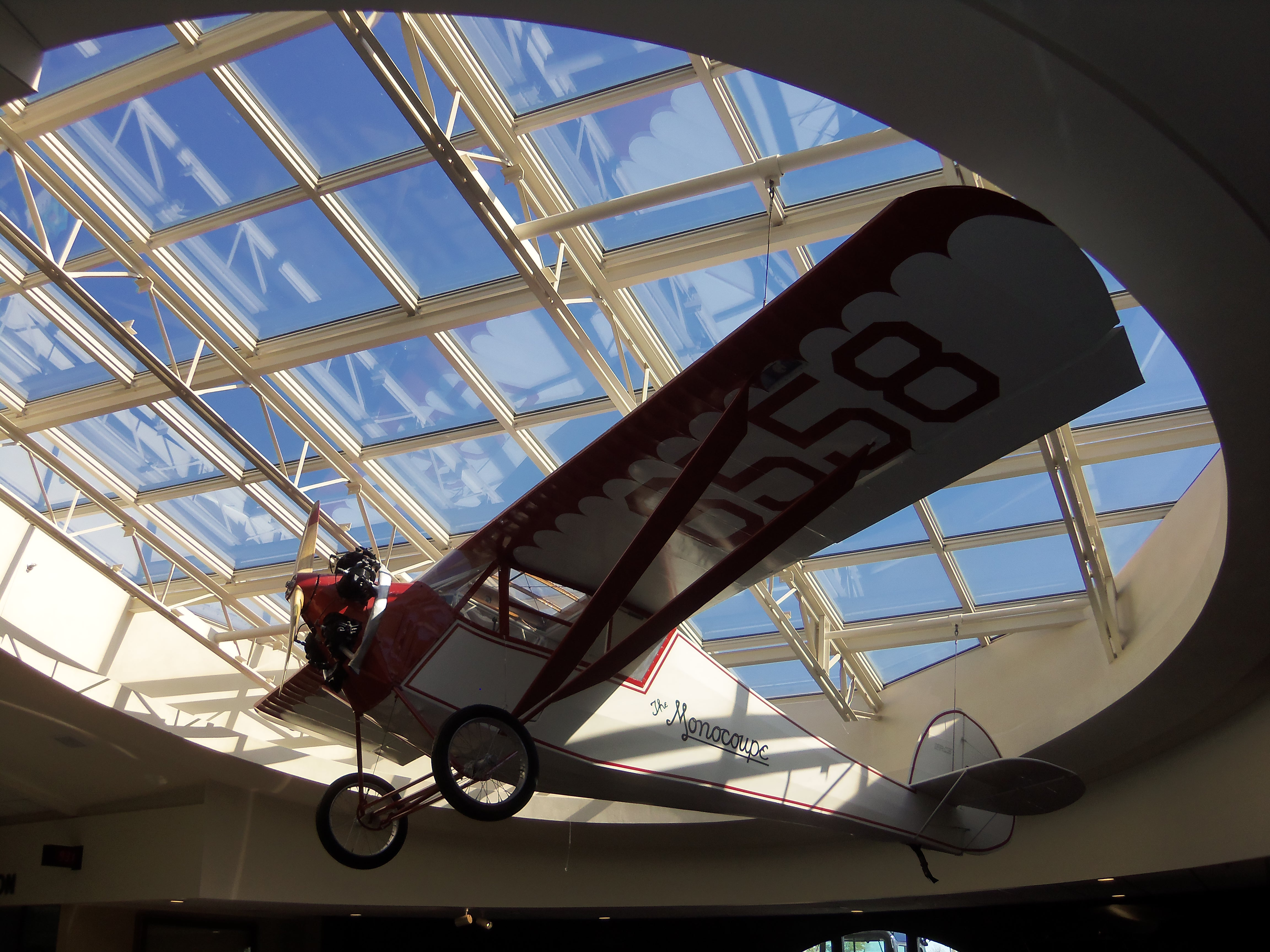
A Velie Monocoupe airplane on display at Quad City International Airport in Moline

Willard Velie, Jr. was named the company’s vice-president in 1927. He was the one who introduced the production of airplanes into the family business. They developed the first six-cylinder valve-in-head airplane motor in 1919. They also developed a five-cylinder radial aircraft that powered their Velie Monocoupe. In 1926, Don Luscombe of Davenport, Iowa and Frank Wallace of Bettendorf, Iowa formed the Central States Aero Company and began building monocoupe airplanes. The Velie’s started working with the company and then bought it in 1928. The result was Mono Aircraft, Inc., a subsidiary of Velie Motor Corporation.

The United States Department of Commerce awarded the Velie Monocoupe its highest rating, and plans were developed to build a four seat monocoach. The plane would never be built. W.L. Velie, Sr. died in October 1928. A month later Willard Jr. stopped the production of automobiles and sold the company's interests to an Indianapolis firm. Four months later, Willard Jr. died and the airplane interests were sold to a St. Louis, Missouri firm. The Velie Motor Corporation came to an end.

=== Private life ===
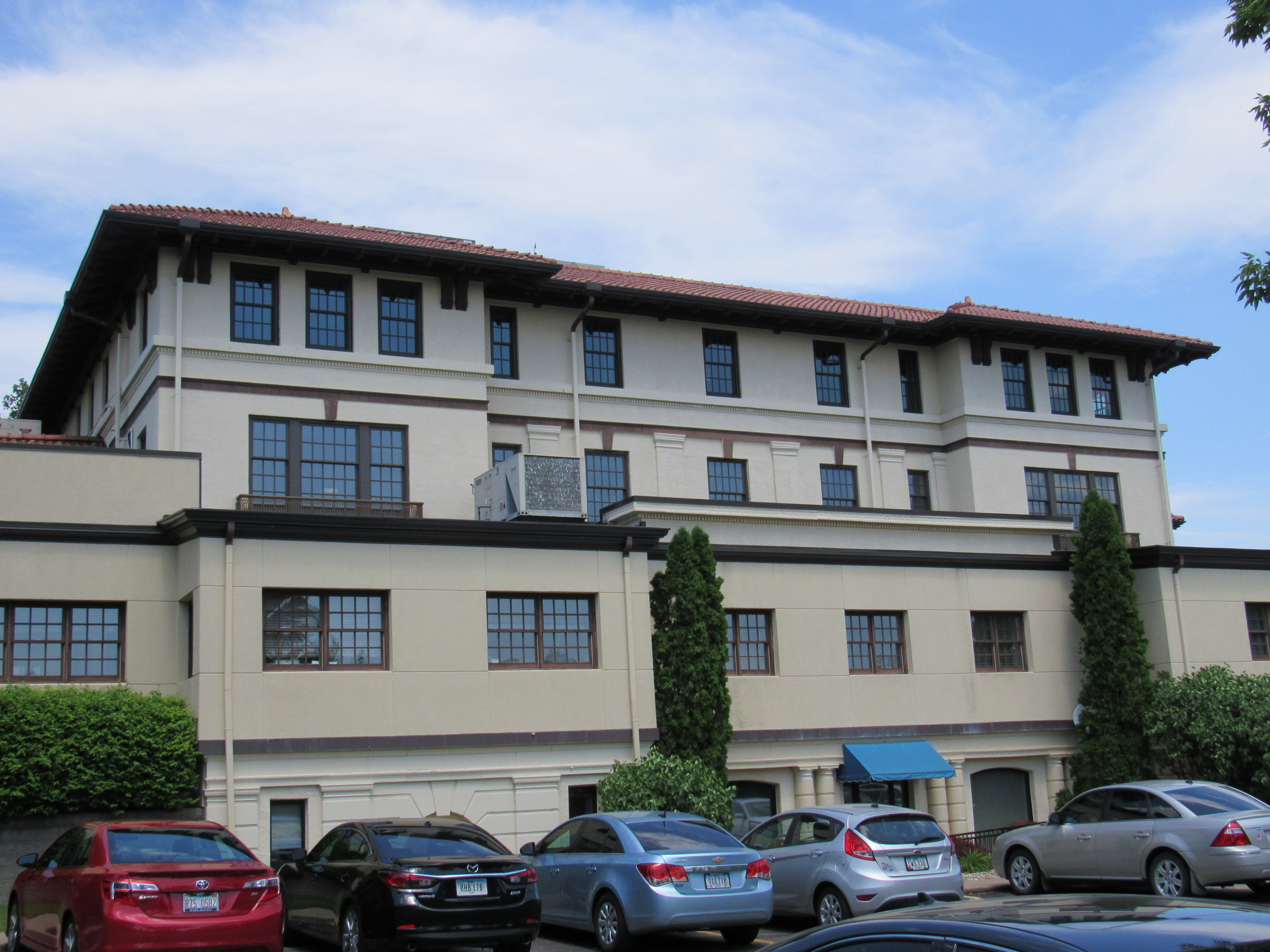
Villa Velie in 2017

W. L. Velie married Annie Flowerree in Helena, Montana on May 21, 1890. She was the daughter of Daniel Augustus Greene Flowerree, who was a millionaire cattle rancher. She was also a sister to his college roommate William Flowerree. The Velies raised two children Willard Jr. and Marjorie.

Velie built a palatial home, named Villa Velie, for his family on a 500-acre (2.0 km^{2}) site on the south side of Moline, overlooking the Rock River Valley. He and his wife were inspired by the many Italian Villas they saw while traveling through Europe. The house was built from 1912-1913 in the Italian Villa style by artisans from Italy and Greece. It contained 46 rooms, of which 14 were bedrooms and 12 bathrooms. The floors on the ground floor and the first floor were covered in marble. Built-in bookcases lined the library walls, which were also frescoed. The slopes toward the river were planted with 21 grape varieties from southern France, and the family produced their own private label wine. The grounds also featured a conservatory that housed banana trees, a putting green, sculptured gardens and a ski run that extended to the river. The family moved to a more modest dwelling during the Great Depression. For a time the house sat empty. In 1941, the home was bought by Stanley Wiedner and it became the Plantation Restaurant. It was succeeded by a restaurant called W.L. Velie’s in 1982. Today the home is the home of QCR Holdings and a branch location of Quad City Bank and Trust.

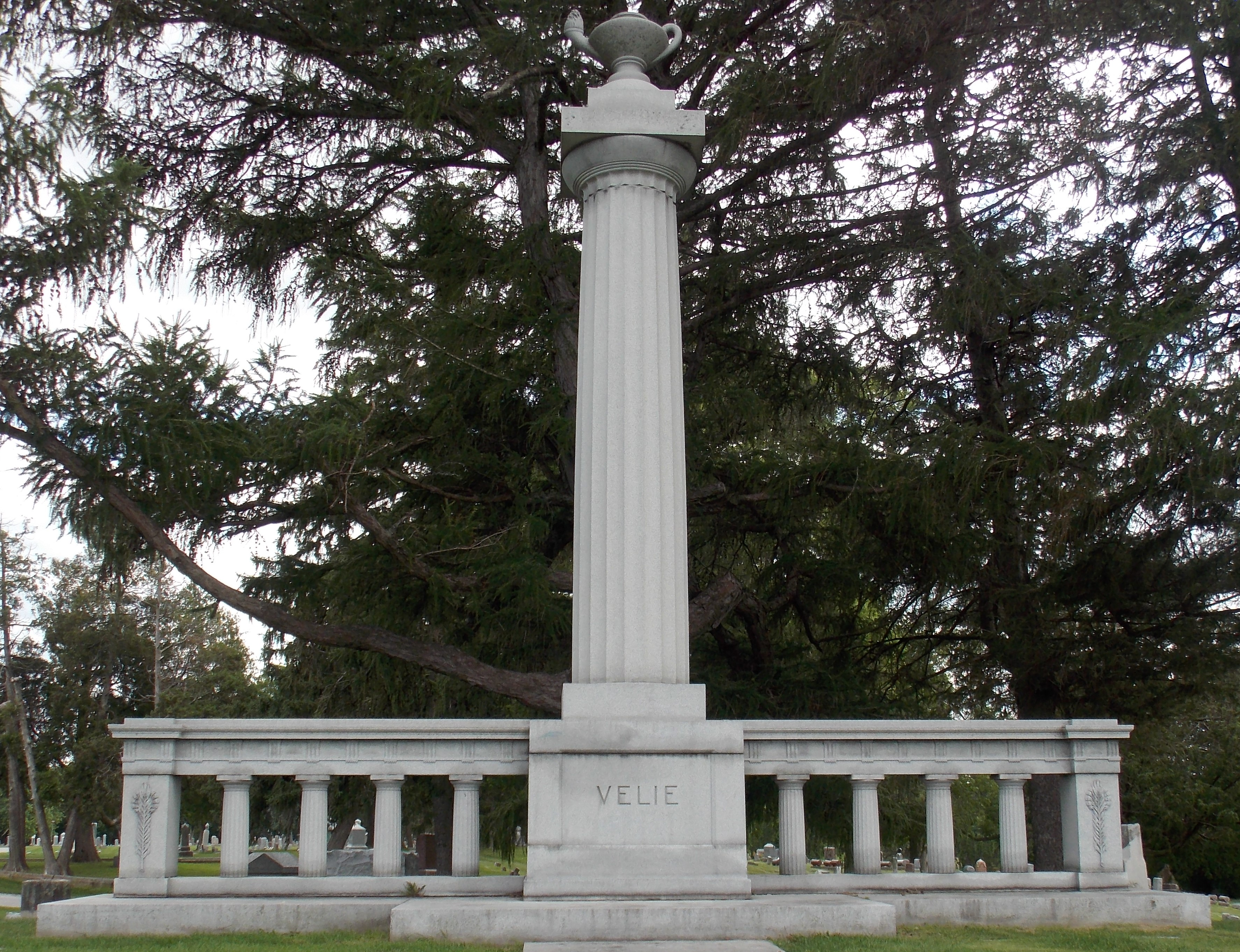
The monument for the Velie family graves in Riverside Cemetery

The Velie’s spent their winters in Fort Myers, Florida. They built a home there next to Annie’s parents along the Caloosahatchee River.

W.L. Velie died of an embolism complicated by a heart problem on October 10, 1928. He was buried in Riverside Cemetery in Moline.
