= Monocoupe 110 Special =

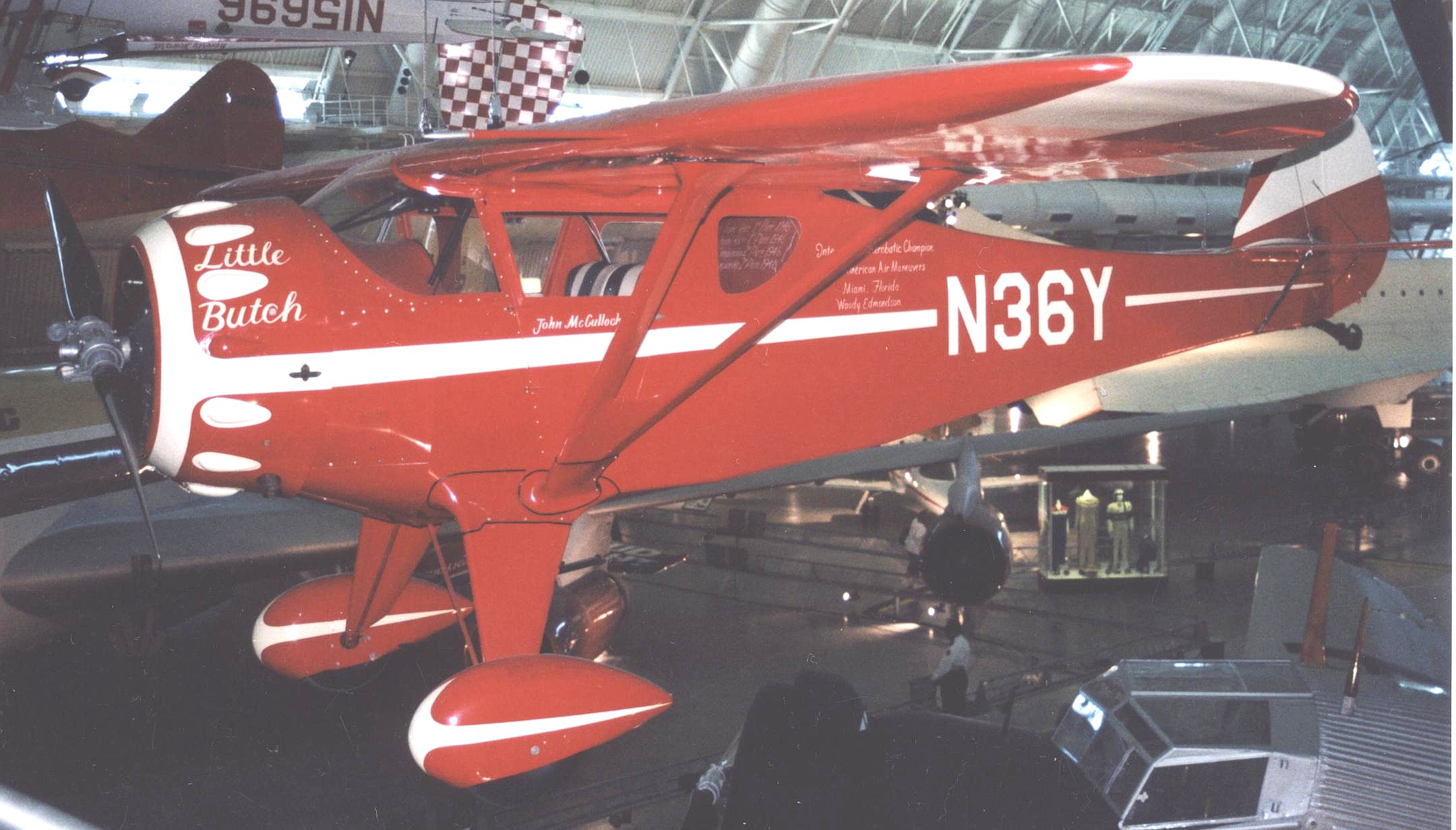
- Monocoupe 110 Special racer "Little Butch" displayed at the National Air and Space Museum Washington DC in April 2004

General information
- Type: light sporting aircraft
- National origin: United States
- Manufacturer: Monocoupe Corp
- Primary user: private and racing pilots

History
- Introduction date: 1931
- Developed from: Monocoupe Model 90
- Variant: Monocoupe 90

The Monocoupe 110 Special is a United States sporting and racing aircraft of the 1930s and 1940s.

== Development ==
The Monocoupe 110 was developed from the Monocoupe 90 using the higher-powered 110 h.p. Warner Scarab radial engine housed in a cowling with bulges to accommodate the larger power unit.

The Monocoupe 110 Special variant of 1931 was built to meet the needs of racing pilots. The wingspan was shortened from the standard 32 ft to 23 ft, a 125 h.p. Warner Scarab was installed and fairings and wheel spats added. Maximum speed increased from 150 mph to 220 mph. Seven of the Specials were built by Monocoupe and three further aircraft were modified to a similar standard by homebuilders.

The last Model 110 Special to be completed in 1941 was N36Y "Little Butch", which re-entered the airshow circuit in 1946, powered by a 185 h.p. Warner Super Scarab engine. The aircraft flew displays until 1981 and was then donated to the National Air and Space Museum in Washington DC.

The Monocoupe 110 Special is being reintroduced and being built in Grantville, Pennsylvania, by the Monocoupe Aeroplane Corporation.

== Specifications (Monocoupe 110 Special) ==
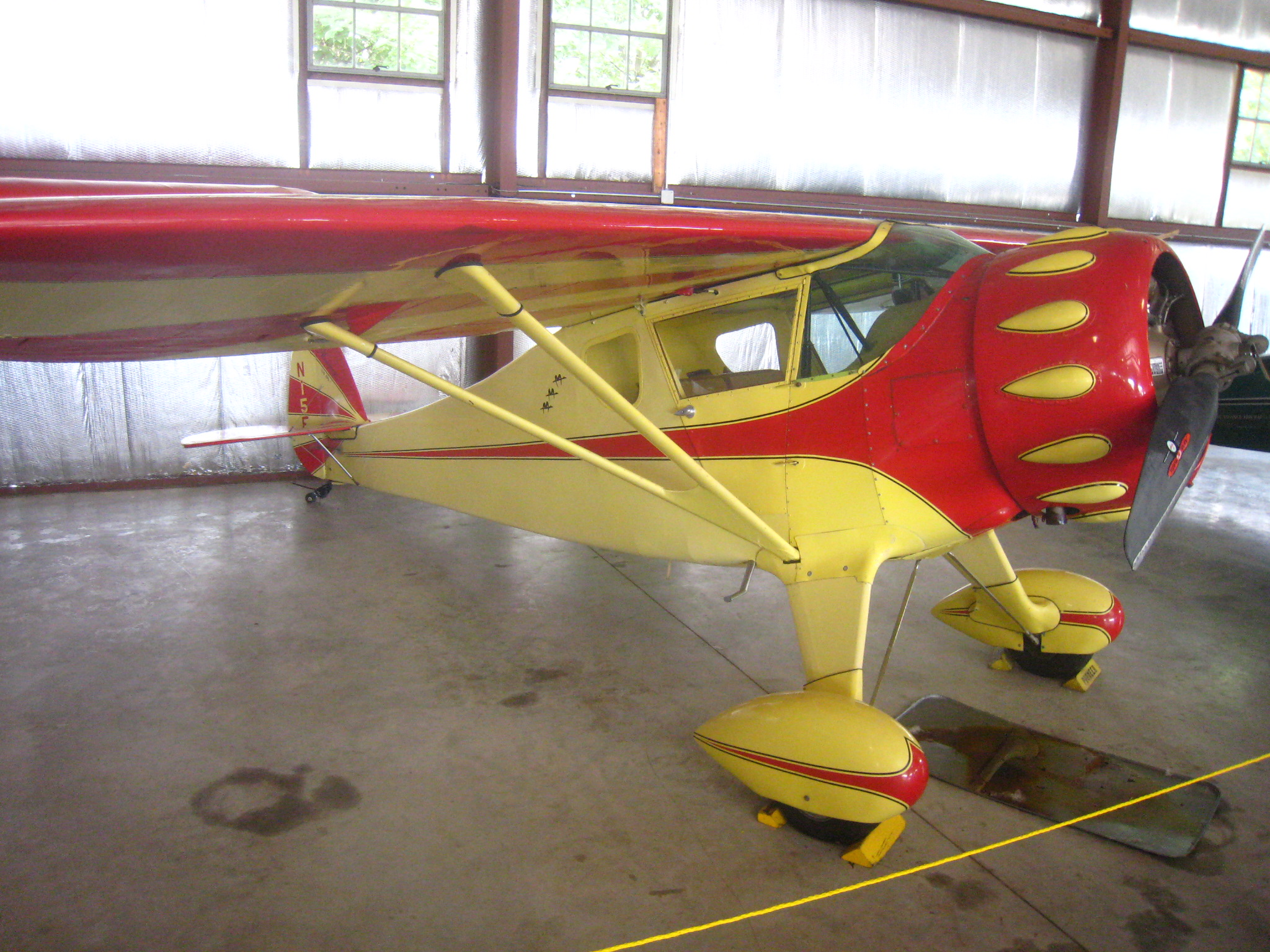
Monocoupe 110

Data from Aerofiles

General characteristics

- Crew: 1
- Capacity: 1 passenger
- Length: 20 ft 5 in (7.11 m)
- Wingspan: 23 ft 3 in (7.09 m)
- Empty weight: 1,020 lb (463 kg)
- Gross weight: 1,610 lb (730 kg)
- Useful lift: 590 lb (268 kg)
- Powerplant: 1 × Warner Scarab 7-cylinder radial , 125 hp (93 kW)

Performance

- Maximum speed: 185 mph (298 km/h, 161 kn)
- Cruise speed: 155 mph (250 km/h, 135 kn)
- Stall speed: 60 mph (97 km/h, 52 kn)
- Range: 500 mi (805 km, 430 nmi)
