= Folkerts SK-2 =

SK-2
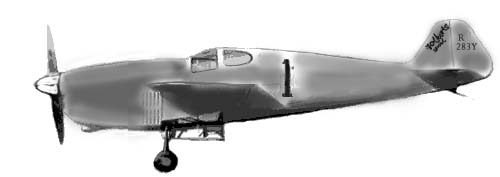
- Folkerts SK-2

General information
- Type: Racing aircraft
- National origin: United States of America
- Designer: Clayton Folkerts, Harold Neumann, Ted Forden
- Number built: 1

History
- Introduction date: 1936
- Variant: Folkerts SK-3

The Folkerts SK-2, also known as Speed King Two, "Toots" and "Miss Detroit" was a racer built for the 1936 National Air Races.

== Design and development ==
Clayton Folkerts designed his second racer, the SK-2 Toots after leaving the Mono-Aircraft Company, and Waco. It was commissioned by TWA pilot Harold Neumann in 1936.

The aircraft was a mid-winged conventional geared aircraft with crank activated retractable landing gear and trailing edge flaps. The fuselage was built of welded steel tube with aircraft fabric covering and the wings were made with spruce spars and plywood covering. The Menasco C-4S engine featured a one-foot propeller extension to allow a more streamlined cowling.

== Operational history ==
In the 1936 National Air Races, Harold Neumann won three firsts, two seconds, and placed fourth in the Thompson Trophy race. Steve Wittman survived a flight in the SK-2 with a ruptured gas tank that leaked into the cockpit. In St. Louis, pilot Roger Don Rae landed gear up, badly damaging the aircraft.

At the 1937 National Air Races, the aircraft was renamed "Miss Detroit" and pilot Roger Don Rae placed three seconds and one fourth place.

In the 1938 Oakland Air Races, the rear fuselage was metalized. Pilot Gus Gotch was chosen as pilot; he entered a spin on a pylon turn and was killed when the aircraft struck the bay. The cause was undetermined, but fellow racing pilots blamed the heavy locking mechanism for the landing gear as a contributing distraction in high-speed low level flight.

== Variants ==
The Folkerts SK-3 has a nearly identical design, except for a longer nose for a Menasco C-6S-4 engine.

== Specifications (Folkerts SK-1) ==
Data from Sport Aviation.

General characteristics

- Capacity: 1
- Length: 19 ft 6 in (5.94 m)
- Wingspan: 16 ft (4.9 m)
- Height: 5 ft 3 in (1.60 m)
- Wing area: 50 sq ft (4.6 m^{2})
- Empty weight: 700 lb (318 kg)
- Gross weight: 1,000 lb (454 kg)
- Powerplant: 1 × Menasco C4S 363 cubic inch, inline, supercharged four cylinder aircraft engine, 185 hp (138 kW)
- Propellers: 2-bladed Fahlin (wooden)

Performance

- Maximum speed: 202 kn (233 mph, 375 km/h)

== See also ==
Related development

- Folkerts SK-1
- Folkerts SK-3
- Folkerts SK-4
