= Folkerts SK-1 =

Racing aircraft

SK-1
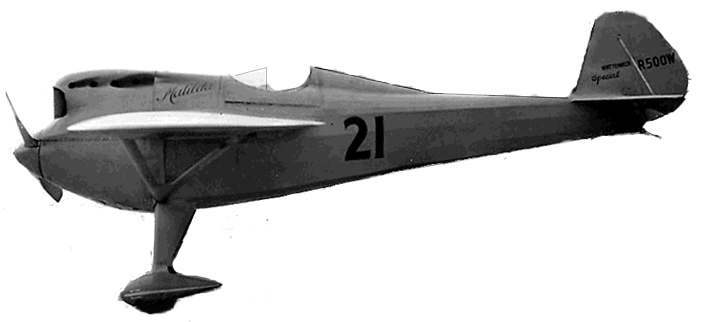
- Folkerts SK-1

General information
- Type: Racing aircraft
- National origin: United States of America
- Manufacturer: Mono-Aircraft Corp
- Designer: Clayton Folkerts
- Number built: 1

History
- Introduction date: 1930

The Folkerts SK-1,Speed King One, Mono Special, Matilda, Fordon-Neumann Special, Hardwick-Whittenbeck Special was a racer built for the 1930 American Cirrus Aircraft Engine Company sponsored American Cirrus Derby.

== Design and development ==
Clayton Folkerts designed the "Mono Special" while working for the Mono-Aircraft Corporation. It was later renamed the SK-1. The aircraft was a strut-braced mid-winged conventional geared aircraft with a slender tapered tail and undersized wheels and fairings.

== Operational history ==
In 1930, for the American Cirrus Derby, pilot John Livingston was hired, but Stub Quinby flew in his place after an illness. The team did not win any earnings. In the 1930 National Air Races, Quinby placed fourth in the 650 Cubic inch class at 142 mph.

In the 1933 American Air Races, the aircraft was renamed the Folkerts SK-1, with modified lift struts and addition of wheel pants. The aircraft won first place twice in the 350 cubic inch class, and third in the 500 cubic inch class piloted by Harold Neumann, and fifth piloted by Marcellus King. During the 1933 International Air Races, Roy Ligget and Roy Hosler won two fifths and one fourth at a speed of 170 mph.

In the 1934 Pan American Air Races, the aircraft was renamed "Matilda". In the 1935 National Air Races, with a modified headrest fairing, the aircraft raced as the "Fordon-Neumann Special" and placed second at 187 mph.

In the 1937 National Air Races, the aircraft raced as the "Hardwick-Whittenbeck Special"

== Specifications (Folkerts SK-1) ==
Data from Sport Aviation

General characteristics

- Capacity: 1
- Powerplant: 1 × American Cirrus 310 cu in supercharged four cylinder in-line engine, 90 hp (67 kW)

Performance

- Maximum speed: 162 kn (187 mph, 301 km/h)

== See also ==
Related development

- Folkerts SK-2
- Folkerts SK-3
- Folkerts SK-4
