= Folkerts Henderson Highwing =

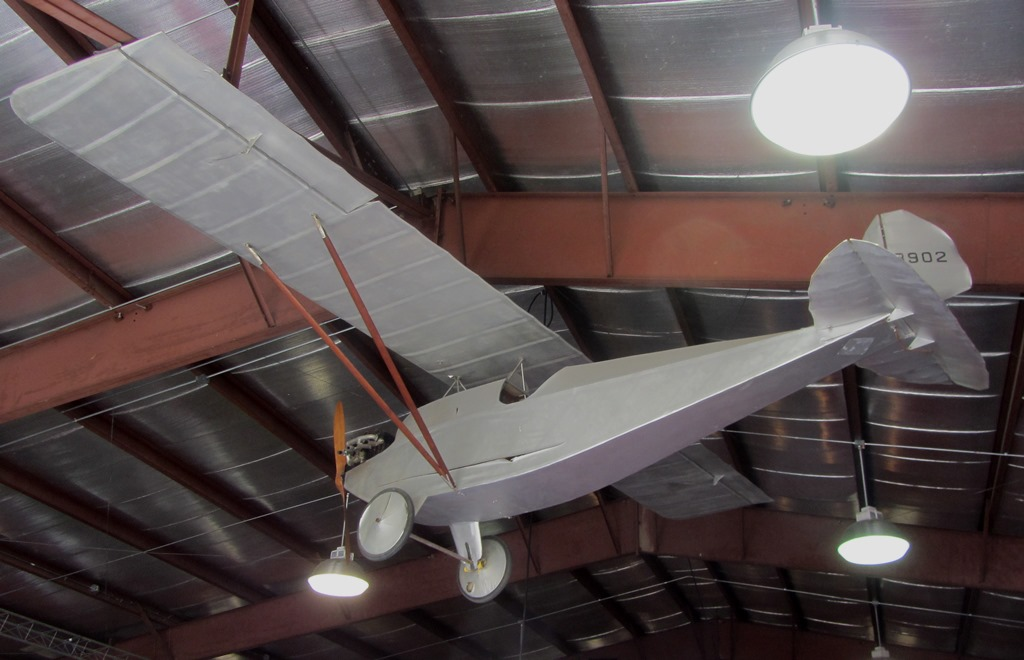
- Folkerts Henderson Highwing on display

General information
- Type: Homebuilt aircraft
- National origin: United States
- Designer: Clayton Folkerts
- Number built: 1

The Folkerts Henderson Highwing is an American single place homebuilt aircraft developed by air-racer Clayton Folkerts.

== Design and development ==
The Folkerts Henderson Highwing is a single place, open cockpit, high-wing light aircraft powered by a Henderson-B4 engine. The aircraft features all-wood construction

== Operational history ==
Clayton Folkerts completed the aircraft in 1928 and flew it until 1932. It was then stored until 1965 when it was presented to the EAA Museum at Oshkosh, Wisconsin. After restoration, it has been exhibited in the Pioneer Village section of the museum site.

== Specifications (Highwing) ==
Data from EAA

General characteristics

- Crew: 1
- Wingspan: 24 ft (7.3 m)
- Empty weight: 210 lb (95 kg)
- Gross weight: 450 lb (204 kg)
- Powerplant: 1 × Heath-Henderson B-4 Inline four cylinder, 20 hp (15 kW)

Performance

- Maximum speed: 65 kn (75 mph, 121 km/h)
- Cruise speed: 56 kn (65 mph, 105 km/h)
