= Clayton Folkerts =

American aircraft designer

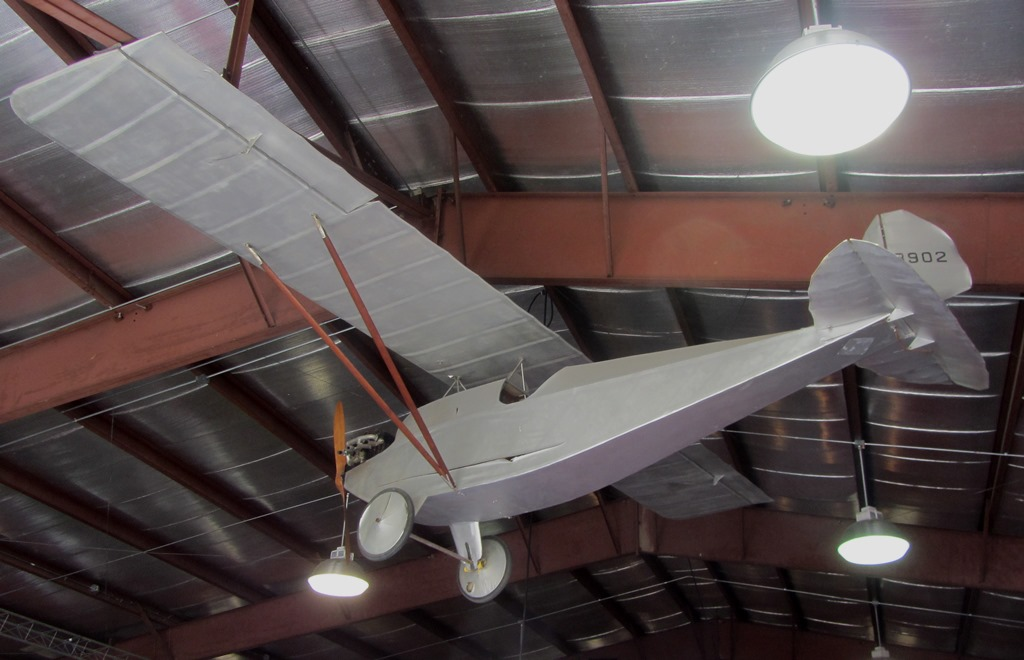
- Folkerts Henderson Highwing
- Born: 9 November 1897; Grundy County, Iowa
- Died: 1964 (aged 68-67)
- Known for: Folkerts racing aircraft
- Parent(s): Atho and Johanna Folkerts

Clayton Folkerts (1897–1964) was an American aircraft designer.

== Early life ==
Self-taught in aircraft design, Clayton built five aircraft at his family farm between 1916 and 1926, including a Henderson powered high-wing.

Folkerts worked for Central States Aero in Davenport, Iowa designing and building the prototype Monocoupe Model 22 in four months for Donald Arthur Luscombe. The Monocoupe would go on to become a popular racing aircraft of the 1920s and 1930s. By the end of 1928, 90% of all light planes and 10% of all licensed airplanes owned in the U.S. were Monocoupes, which remained in production until 1950.

Folkerts designed a series of winning air racers, the Folkerts SK-1, Folkerts SK-2, and Folkerts SK-3 that won at the National Air Races.

During World War II, Folkerts managed assault glider production. After the war, Folkerts returned to farming in Bristow, Iowa.

In 1993 Folkerts was inducted in the Iowa Aviation Museum Hall of Fame. The 1928 Folkerts Henderson High Wing was restored in 1965 for display, and resides in the EAA Airventure Museum in Oshkosh, Wisconsin.

== See also ==
- Folkerts Henderson Highwing
