= Folkerts SK-3 =

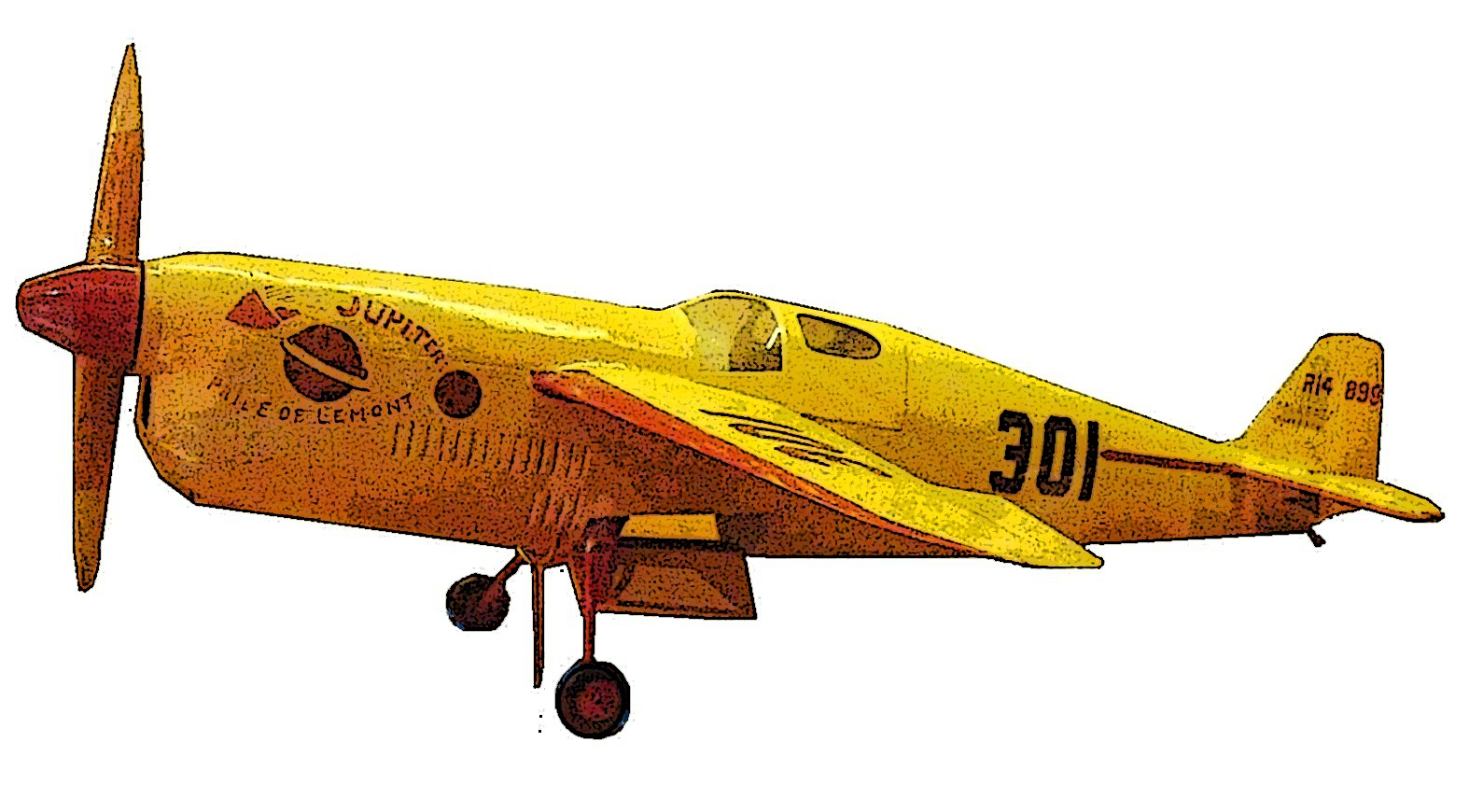

General information
- Type: Racing aircraft
- National origin: United States of America
- Designer: Clayton Folkerts
- Status: Crashed at 1938 Miami Air Races
- Number built: 1

History
- First flight: 1937
- Developed from: Folkerts SK-2

The Folkerts SK-3 a.k.a. "Jupiter, Pride of Lemont" was the third in a series of air racers developed by Clayton Folkerts.

== Design and development ==
The SK-3 was built for mechanic Rudy A. Kling from Lemont, Illinois as his personal racing aircraft. Kling assisted in the construction of the aircraft. The Folkerts SK-2 was the basis for the aircraft, with a slight upscaling in size with a larger Menasco C6-S engine.

The SK-3 was a midwinged conventional aircraft with retractable landing gear. The fuselage was long and slender. The thin wings used spruce spars, plywood covering, and incorporated split flaps. The fuselage was welded steel tubing with aircraft fabric covering, built in two parts that were bolted together. The manual retractable landing gear used a single lever, rather than earlier crank systems. There were two 11 U.S. gallons (42 L; 9.2 imp gal) forward fuel tanks, a 27 U.S. gallons (100 L; 22 imp gal) main, and an auxiliary of 12 U.S. gallons (45 L; 10.0 imp gal) mounted behind the cockpit. The Menasco C6-S was modified by Kling to produce 400 hp (298 kW) at 3300 rpm, versus the standard 250 hp (186 kW) output.

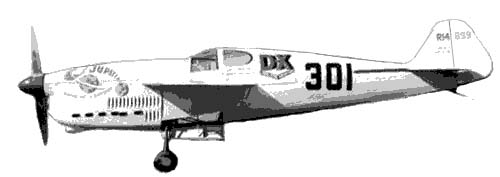
Folkerts Sk-3 in final configuration

== Operational history ==
Rudy Kling was the exclusive pilot of the SK-3. Kling had only 150 hours experience in a J-5-powered Travel Air before flying the racer. In the 1937 Greve Race, Kling came in at first place at 232.27 mph (374 km/h), just beating Wittman's Chief Oshkosh.

At the 1937 Thompson Trophy race in the National Air Races, he again won at 256.910 mph (413 km/h). On December 3, 1937, during the 1938 Miami Air Races, the SK-3 crashed in the wash of a larger aircraft with Kling dying on his 29th birthday.

== Variants ==
SK-4
Unlike other SK racers which were progressively improved, the SK-4 built at Kansas City municipal airport was a copy of the SK-3 aircraft with a goal of attaining a 330 mph (531 km/h) maximum speed from a new metal propeller. Roger Don Rae flew in the 1938 National Air Races, but dropped out due to wing flutter. In the 1939 National Air Races, pilot Del Bush crashed. Folkerts did not build any more racers after the SK-4.

== Specifications (Folkerts SK-3) ==
Data from Sport Aviation

General characteristics

- Capacity: 1
- Length: 21 ft 0 in (6.40 m)
- Wingspan: 16 ft 8 in (5.08 m)
- Height: 4 ft 0 in (1.22 m)
- Wing area: 51 sq ft (4.7 m^{2})
- Empty weight: 840 lb (381 kg)
- Gross weight: 1,385 lb (628 kg)
- Fuel capacity: 61 U.S. gallons (230 L; 51 imp gal)
- Powerplant: 1 × Menasco C6S Six-cylinder inline, supercharged, 400 hp (300 kW)

Performance

- Maximum speed: 267 kn (307 mph, 494 km/h)
- Stall speed: 55 kn (63 mph, 101 km/h)

== See also ==
Related development

- Folkerts SK-1
- Folkerts SK-2
