= Monocoupe Aircraft =

Light airplane manufacturer

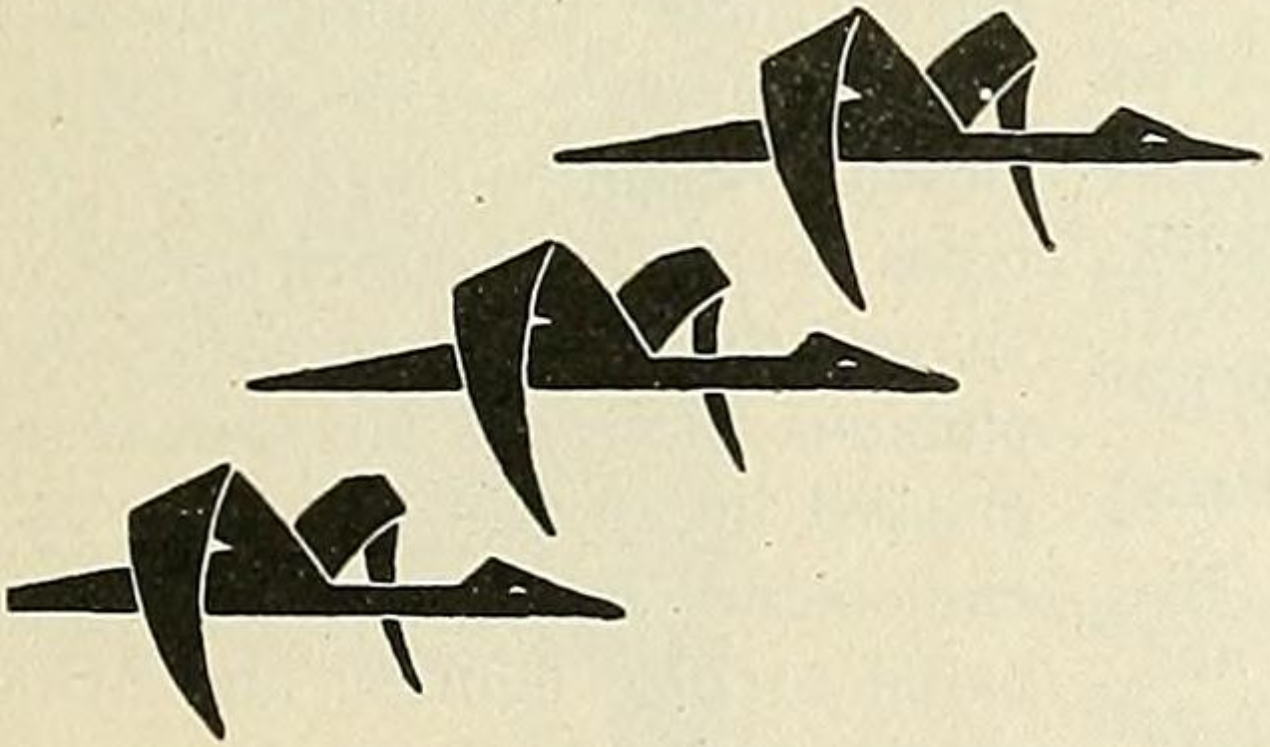

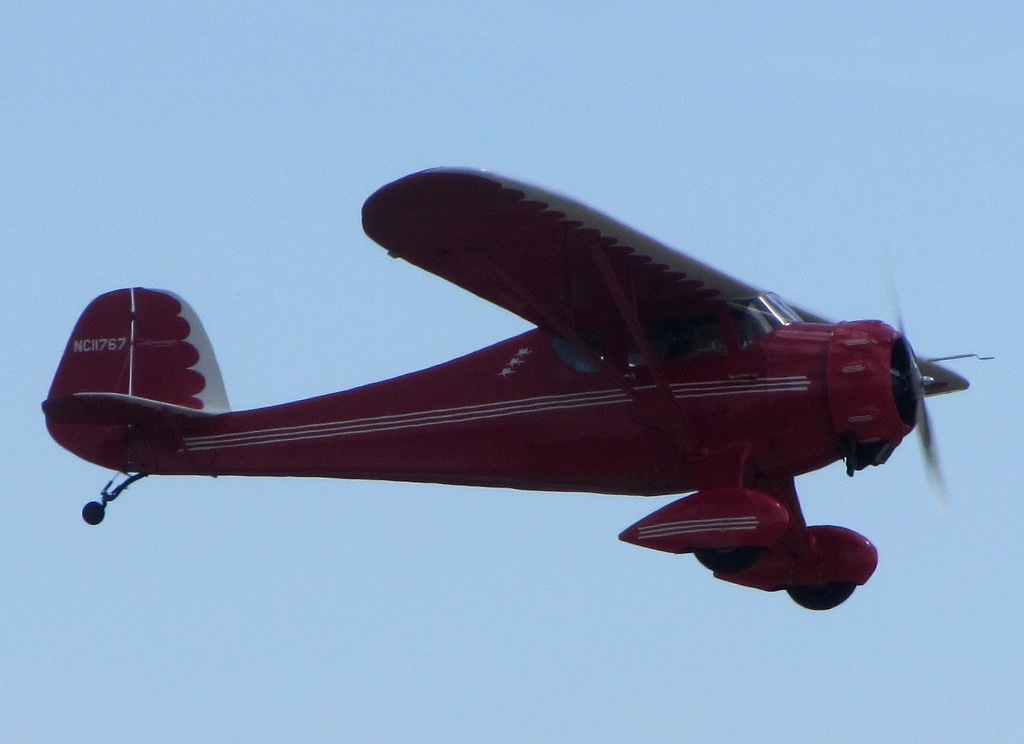
- A Monocoupe 90A
- Industry: Aerospace
- Founded: 1927
- Key people: Clare W. Bunch
- Products: Aircraft

Monocoupe Aircraft was a manufacturer of light airplanes originally produced in the late 1920s and 1930s. They introduced relatively inexpensive, compact, and sporty aircraft in an era of large, maintenance intensive, open-cockpit biplanes, and the Monocoupe series was one of the first economical, closed-cabin, two-seat, light aircraft in the United States. As a result, the Monocoupe soon became a successful brand.

== History ==
=== Original company ===
Central States Airplane Company was established in 1927 to build Don Luscombe's Monocoupe, that was designed and built by Clayton Folkerts. In January 1928, the company became the Mono Aircraft Division of Velie Motor Corporation. Following Willard Velie's death in March 1929, the Velie interests were sold to Allied Aviation Industries, a holding company. By May, these interests were divided into two separate companies: the Lambert Aircraft Engine Corporation and the Mono Aircraft Company of Moline, Illinois. Both companies passed into receivership in 1931, reemerging in 1932 as the Lambert Engine and Machine Company and the Monocoupe Corporation. In July 1934, the two companies joined under the newly formed Lambert Aircraft Corporation with Monocoupe continuing to operate under its own name.

The company was dissolved in 1940 and its assets passed to the Monocoupe Aeroplane and Engine Corporation of Orlando, Florida. Later, in September 1941, Monocoupe acquired the Bristol Aircraft Corporation of Bristol, Virginia and its Canadian subsidiary Bristol Aircraft Products Ltd. The operations of these three companies were combined under the Universal Molded Products Corporation with Monocoupe forming a separate division of the company. Aircraft production halted during World War II, resuming briefly in 1948-1950 under the name Monocoupe Airplane and Engine Corporation. In 1955, the corporate assets were acquired by a West Virginia aviation group, which reorganized the company as Monocoupe Aircraft of Florida, Inc. and transferred operations to Melbourne, Florida.

=== Modern companies ===
The company name re-emerged as Mono Aircraft, Inc. briefly in 1992, in Cheney, Kansas, with the Monocoupe type certificate acquired by Saturn Aircraft & Engineering, Oxnard, California. Aviat Aircraft developed a modernized variation of the Monocoupe 110 as the 200-horsepower 110 Special, and sold a few with modern 200-horsepower engines. The Monocoupe Aeroplane Corporation was again re-established in Grantville, Pennsylvania, in late 2016, to build reproduction Monocoupe 110 Specials with Warner 185 engines and modern technology.

== Aircraft ==
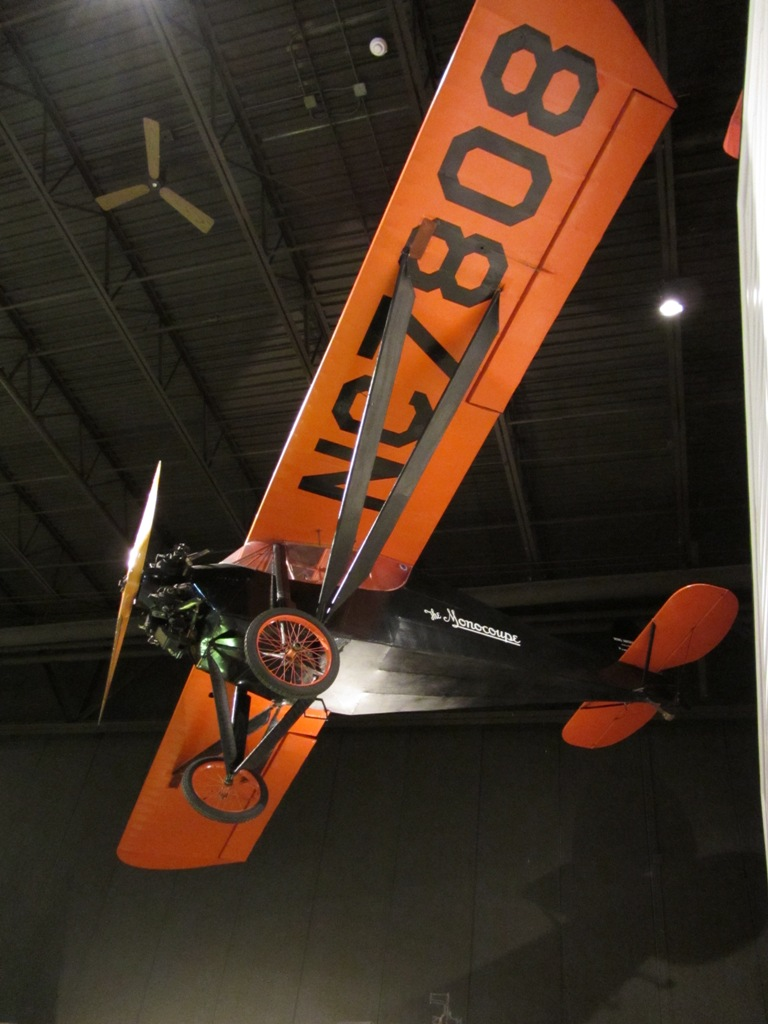
A Model 113 on display at the EAA Aviation Museum

Model name	First flight	Number built	Type
Monocoupe Meteor			
Monocoach Model H			
Monocoach Model 201			
Monocoach Model 275			
Monocoupe Model 5			
Monocoupe Model 22	1927	20	
Monocoupe Model 70	1928		
Monocoupe Model 90			
Monocoupe Model 110			
Monocoupe Model 113			
Monocoupe Model 125			
Monocoupe Model D-145			
Monoprep Model 90			
Monoprep Model 218			
Monosport Model 1			
Monosport Model 2			
Monosport Model D			
Monosport Model G			
Monocoupe Model 1344			
