= Folkert van Koutrik =

Dutch national working for Abwehr

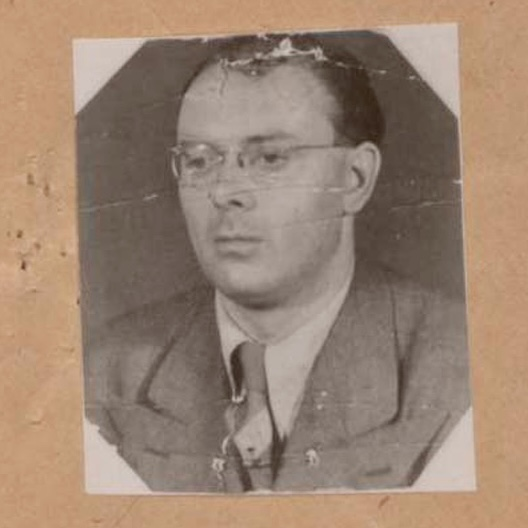
Folkert Arie van Koutrik (1912–1988)

Folkert Arie van Koutrik (5 August 1912 – 14 November 1988) was a Dutch national who spied on British operations via their embassy at The Hague on behalf of Abwehr, the German military intelligence agency. van Koutrik infiltrated MI5 and S.I.S. before he was discovered. His code name was Walbach.

He was born in Rotterdam to Arie van Koutrik and Hendrika Laurentia Veenendaal. He died in 1988.
