= Velie =

Automobile manufacturer of Moline, IL, USA, active 1908-1928

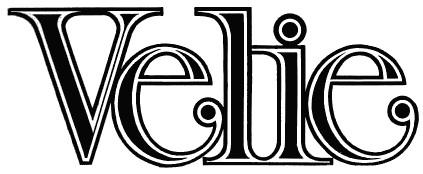

Overview
- Manufacturer: Velie Motors Corporation
- Production: 1908-28

Body and chassis
- Body style: roadster

Powertrain
- Engine: four-cylinder four-stroke gasoline

Dimensions
- Wheelbase: 115 in (2921 mm)

Velie was a brass era American automobile brand produced by the Velie Motors Corporation in Moline, Illinois from 1908 to 1928. The company was founded by and named for Willard Velie, a maternal grandson of John Deere.

Velie founded Velie Carriage Company in 1902, which was successful, then Velie Motor Vehicle Company in 1908.

== History ==
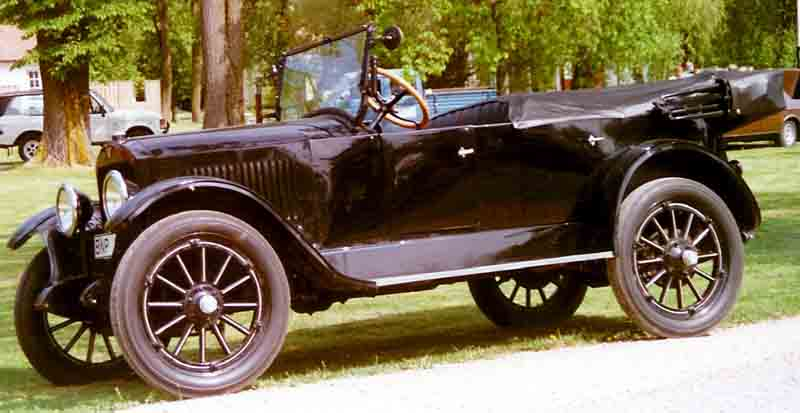
1920 Model 34 Touring

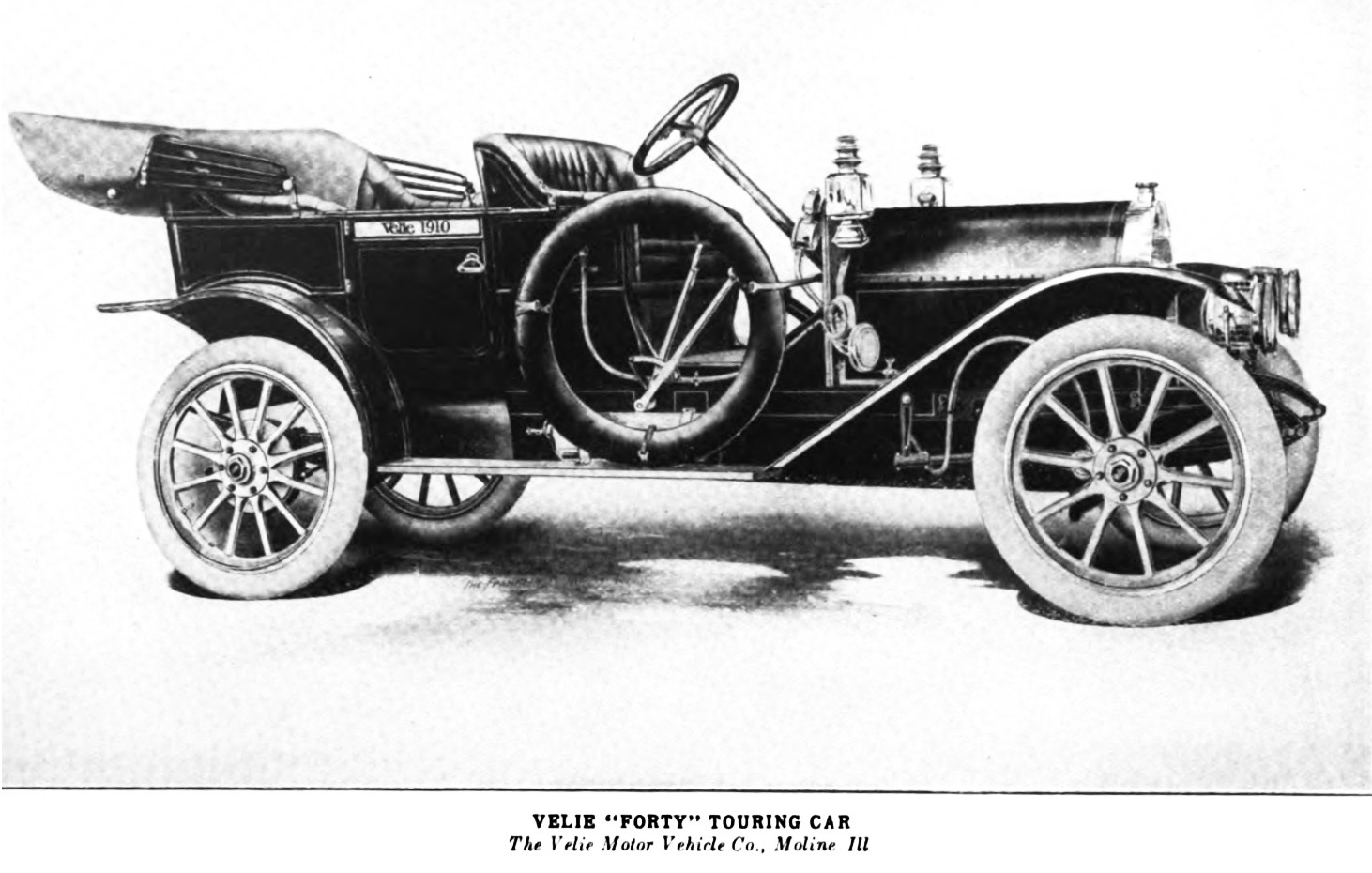
Velie Model 40 (1910-1913)

Velie ads bragged they "produce every important part" and were not simply assemblers, a lesson Ford had taught. However, Velie's first car was assembled with many components purchased from outside suppliers. By 1910, Velie had sold more than 1000 cars.

In 1911 Velie introduced a truck line, and began making a proprietary four-cylinder engine, although some parts came from suppliers.

The 1911 Velie 40 had a 334 cu in (5.47 L) 4.5 in × 5.25 in (114 mm × 133 mm) four-cylinder L-head four-stroke gasoline engine, fired by Splitdorf magneto, producing 40 hp (30 kW), mated to a Brown-Lipe sliding-gear transmission with three forward gears, and one reverse gear). It was a four-seater with a 115 in (2,900 mm) wheelbase and 34 in × 4 in (860 mm × 100 mm) hickory artillery wheels, shod in the customer's choice of Hartford or Firestone tires. It was priced at US$1800, which compared against US$1500 for the Colt Runabout and US$1600 for the Oakland 40, but well below even American's lowest-price model, at US$4250 (its highest was US$5250).

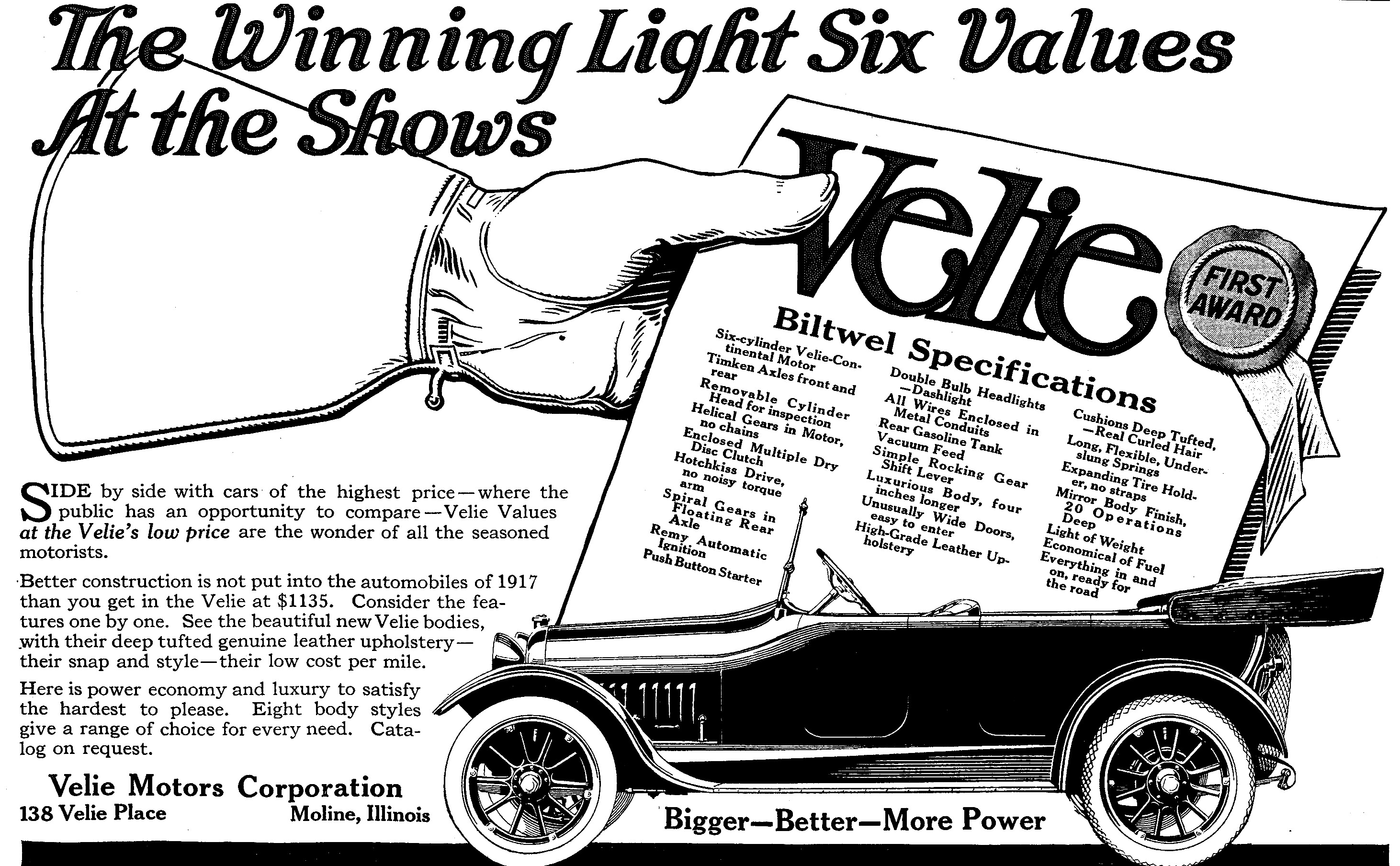
1917 Velie Light Six ad

In 1914, a six-cylinder Continental joined electric start and Bosch dual ignition. Velie production averaged about 5,000 cars a year, peaking at 9,000 in 1920. Beginning in 1916, all Velies were powered by six-cylinder engines; in 1926 a straight eight Lycoming engine was also offered. Velie chose to focus production solely on its six-cylinder OHV Model 58 in 1922. In 1924, Velie began installing Westinghouse electric ignitions in their cars. Added to this in 1925 were four-wheel hydraulic brakes and balloon tires, both still novel.

Velie's Royal Sedan body had a raked "A" pillar, which gave its windshield a significant angle.

According to the Official Velie Register, worldwide 230 Velies are known to exist as of 2010. A 1924 Model 58 is running in New Zealand.

=== Tractor ===
Biltwell Velie 12-24

In 1916, the Velie Biltwell 12-24 tractor was introduced. The Velie tractor was designed and developed by Otto E. Szekeley, an engineer in the tractor department who is responsible for tractor production. The tractor has been experimental since 1915 and has undergone very strict tests and inspections. The tractor's engine was Velie's own design. In 1919, the bore of the four-cylinder engine was slightly increased.

=== Aircraft and aircraft engines ===
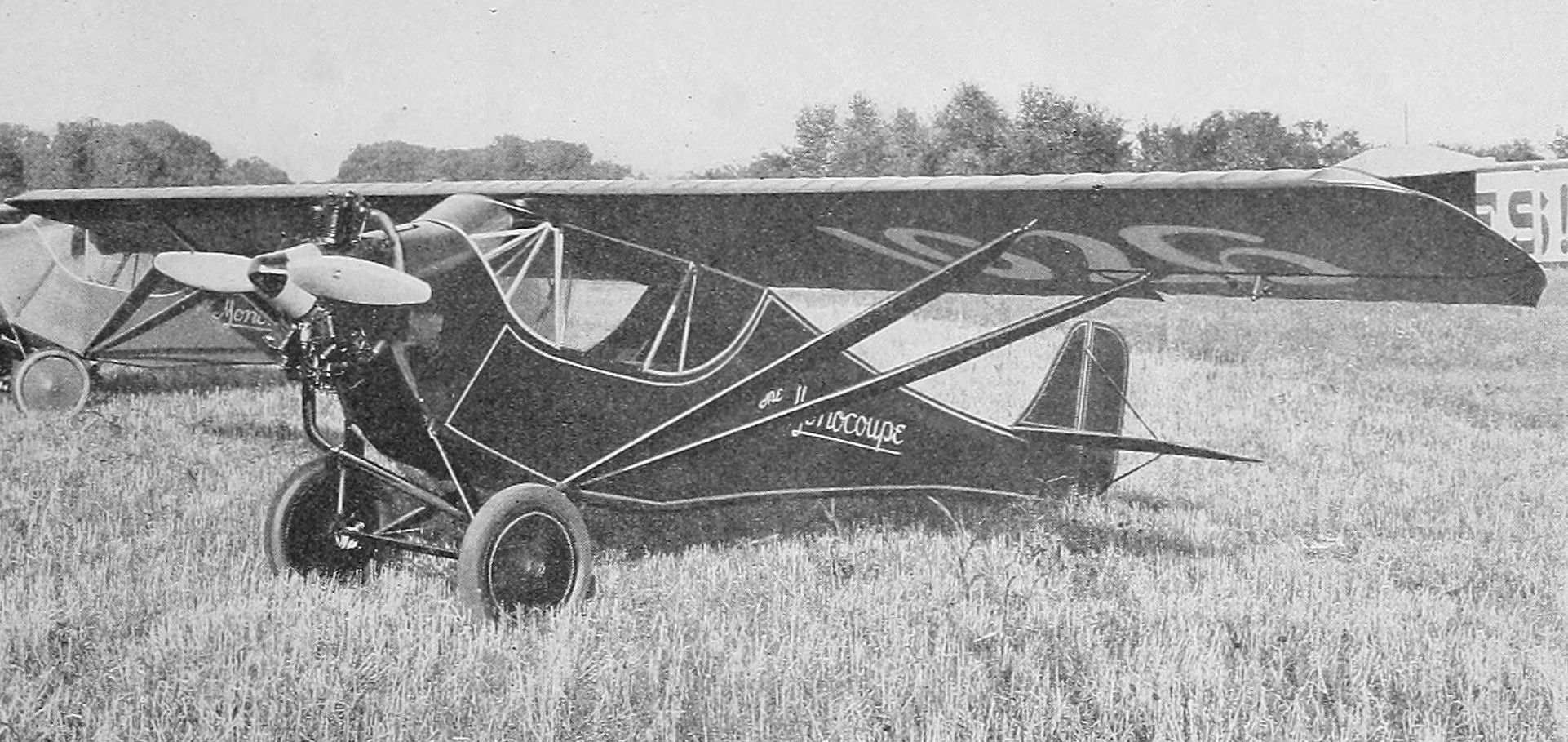
Velie Monocoupe monoplane

In 1927, the company bought out a general aviation company, moving it to Iowa as Mono Aircraft Inc. and began producing aircraft, Under this banner, the company produced the Monocoupe 70, which proved "an instant success".

In addition, they provided engines for aircraft. Velie's M-5 aircraft engine, produced in 1928, produced 65 hp (48 kW) at 1900 rpm on a displacement of 250 cu in (4.1 L) and a 4.125 in × 3.75 in (104.8 mm × 95.3 mm) bore and stroke.

Production and development of the aircraft line survived the demise of Velie by several years.

=== Deaths of Willard and Willard Jr. ===
Willard Velie died in October 1928, and his son, Willard, Jr. was unable to keep both the Velie automobile and airplane companies operating, so he eliminated the car line in January 1929. In March 1929 Willard Jr. died, and Mono was sold to Phil Ball, a St. Louis businessman and one of the backers of Charles Lindbergh. Monocoupes were then produced for several years in St. Louis. The car plant was purchased by Deere.
