= Donald A. Luscombe =

American businessman (1895–1965)

Donald Arthur Luscombe
- Born: 25 May 1895; Iowa City, Iowa, US
- Died: 10 January 1965 (aged 69)
- Resting place: Iowa City, Iowa, US
- Employer(s): U.S. Army Air Corps, Central States Aero Corporation
- Known for: Luscombe Aircraft
- Children: Patricia Luscombe, James True Luscombe
- Parent: James L Luscombe

Donald Arthur Luscombe (May 25, 1895 – January 10, 1965) was an American businessman and entrepreneur. He is best known as the founder of Luscombe Aircraft, which produced an advanced sheet-metal-fuselage light aircraft during the 1930–1950 time period in the US.

== Biography ==
Luscombe was born on May 25, 1895, in Iowa City, Iowa.

When the US entered World War I, he volunteered for duty in France, where he served as an ambulance driver. He received a citation for valor for this service.

After returning home, Luscombe married. He and his wife Eleanor had a girl on 9 February 1922, but she died 19 days later (28 February 1922). A second child, a boy named James True Luscombe, was born on 4 August 1927. James was the founder of Luscombe Engineering Company (1954–present); he died on May 8, 1984, and is survived by James H. Luscombe, Kelly A. Luscombe, Elizabeth S. Luscombe and Patricia J. Luscombe.

Donald Luscombe died in January 1965. He was buried in the Oakland Cemetery in Iowa City, Iowa.

== Aviation career ==
While in France, Luscombe received his first aeroplane ride, in a French Voisin III. After returning to the US he launched a career in advertising in Davenport, Iowa, and purchased a Curtiss JN-4, which he learned to fly. The Jenny's open cockpit and tandem seating arrangement caused Luscombe to envision an improved arrangement, with enclosed cockpit and side-by-side seating.

To further the idea, Luscombe talked several business associates into joining with him to form the Central States Aero Company, Inc. They hired Clayton Folkerts, a young Iowa farmer, to design and build the aircraft, which they called Monocoupe. The first example emerged in 1927—a cheap, light, quick, efficient, comfortable two-seater—and was the beginning of a radical change in personal aviation in the United States, the small, enclosed-cockpit "personal" light plane, well-suited for comfortable cross-country travel.

In 1928, Luscombe published his first book, Simplified Flying.

In 1933 he left the Monocoupe business (owned by Lambert Aircraft Corporation at the time) and moved to Kansas City, Missouri, to found another company, the Luscombe Airplane Development Corporation, building all-metal monocoque fuselage aircraft. The company resumed production of light aircraft when World War II ended, but a glut of surplus aircraft caused his company to fail. Its assets were bought by Temco, but Luscombe did not remain in the business.
