= Deerfield Society of Arts and Crafts =

Inspired by the Arts and Crafts movement and the concept, organization, work and success of the Deerfield Society of Blue and White Needlework, citizens of Deerfield, Massachusetts began to create, show, and sell their craft and art works. Success in the 1899 Summer Exhibition in Deerfield, as well as two subsequent exhibitions, encouraged Madeline Yale Wynne, a founding member of the Chicago Arts and Crafts Society, to organize the Deerfield Society of Arts and Crafts in 1901, and to serve as its president. The Society changed its name in 1906 to the Society of Deerfield Industries.

== Converging factors ==
Several interrelated forces at work in Deerfield during the 19th century were important in the rise of the Deerfield Society of Arts & Crafts. Agriculture in the area was declining, which had an economic impact on the area. Following the Civil War, there were fewer male-led households because of the diminished population of men. This led to a loosening of traditional roles for women, and also meant that more women were able to inherit property along "the Street," Deerfield's main street filled with stately 18th century houses. Besides long-time residents of the town, middle and upper-class urban women began to buy and restore homes, some for summer use, along "the Street" in the 1880s and 1890s. By the beginning of the 20th century, about one third of the houses on "the Street" were owned by women. These houses had parlors which they converted into work spaces and salesrooms as they began to embrace the Arts & Crafts movement.

== History ==
The women who came to Deerfield for the summer were important for much of the planning and marketing of the products. They lent their expertise for purposes of organization, product development, and marketing. Local women provided much of the labor needed to produce the items to sell, and relied upon the income to support themselves and relatives.

An article in a 1901 publication noted the difficulty of keeping promising young people in a rural town: "How can the young women who resent an idle life and are unreconciled of going into the mill or factory find at home something to do that is interesting and reasonably remunerative?" It indicated that Deerfield had solved the problem with a village industry that might serve as a model for other towns. The products, it suggested, would be of interest to those furnishing colonial houses. "The colonial and craft revivals provided Deerfield women with an opportunity to seek economic security without jeopardizing their status as elite descendants of New England's first families."

The Society of Blue & White Needlework was the first Arts & Crafts organization founded in Deerfield, in 1896. In September 1899, the first annual Arts & Crafts exhibition was held. In 1900, the Deerfield Basket Makers was founded. In 1901, the Deerfield Society of Arts and Crafts was formed under the leadership of Madeline Yale Wynne. There followed the Pocumtuck Basket Makers and the Deerfield Rug Makers in 1902. Others worked on their own in a variety of areas: rug making, weaving, furniture production, art photography, metalwork, bookbinding, and ornamental iron work. Each group of crafts people in the town was represented by one member on the Society's Board of Directors. This society took on the responsibility for overseeing the annual exhibit and sale of works, which was extremely successful.

In 1906, the Society of Blue and White Needlework pulled out of the Deerfield Society of Arts and Crafts, which was then renamed the Society of Deerfield Industries. Group exhibitions were held every summer from 1899 to 1916. In 1917, World War I intervened, and an exhibition was not held. It was also not held in 1918, because Madeline Yale Wynne, the founder of the Society, had died. There was an exhibit in 1919, the 20th anniversary of town exhibitions, but this was the last one for ten years. In 1941, the start of World War II meant the end of the Society.

== Selected member artisans ==
Frances Stebbins Allen (1854 -1941) and Mary Electa Allen (1858 - 1941): Pictorial photographers who were among the first to join the Society

Eleanor Arms (1864 - 1937): Weaver

Gertrude Porter Ashley and Mildred Porter Ashley: Basket makers who published Raffia Basketry as a Fine Art in 1915

Ellen Miller (1854 - 1929): Founding member of the Blue & White Society, needleworker, left Society in 1906 when the embroidery group left the Society

Augustus V. Tack (1870 - 1949): Portrait and landscape painter

Chauncey Thomas (1877 - 1950): Potter who worked in Deerfield from 1909 to 1911

Louanna Thorn (1875 - 1965): Weaver

Margaret C. Whiting (1860 - 1846): Founding member of the Blue & White Society, needleworker, left Society in 1906 when the embroidery group left the Society
