= Margaret C. Whiting =

Massachusetts artist (1860–1946)

Margaret C. Whiting (1860–1946), was born in Chester, Massachusetts but lived much of her adult life in Deerfield, Massachusetts. She trained as an artist, and published an illustrated book with Ellen Miller on wild flowers. She and Miller co-founded the Deerfield Society of Blue and White Needlework, where she contributed her skills as a designer and teacher, and provided leadership for the organization. She won a gold medal for her needlework from the 1915 Worlds Fair in San Francisco for its design and color.

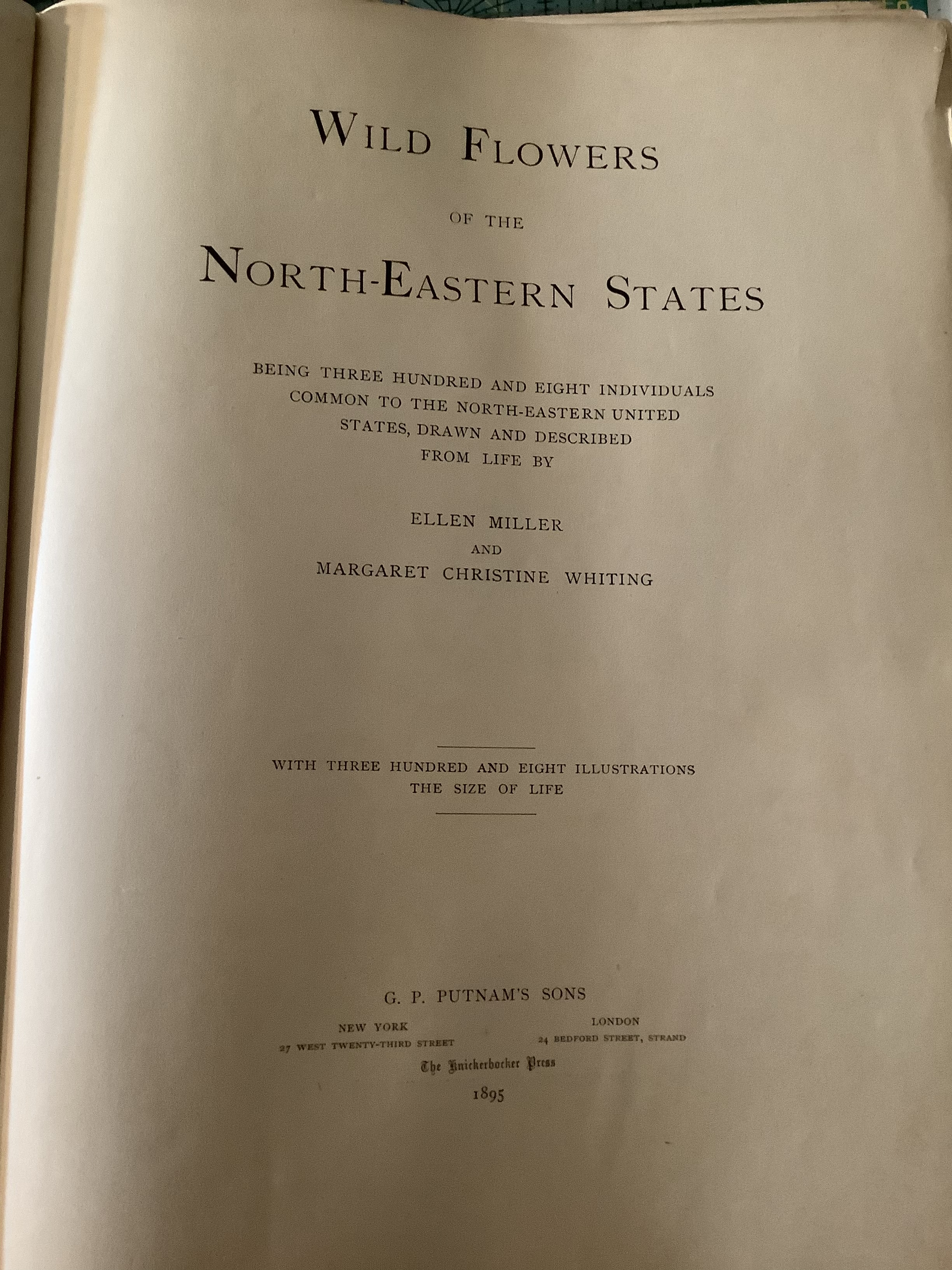
Title page of Wild Flowers of the North-Eastern States by Miller and Whiting, 1895

== Life prior to the founding of the Deerfield Society ==
Whiting was born in Chester, Massachusetts, and went to school in Chicopee and Holyoke, Massachusetts. While living in Holyoke, she taught sewing at the Holyoke Women's Club. With her widowed mother and her sister, she moved to Deerfield in 1895, where Ellen Miller's family had lived since 1893. She and Ellen Miller both studied at the National Academy of Design, and in the summer of 1884, they were students of Robert Crannell Minor, part of the Barbizon school of painters. In 1895, Whiting and Miller together wrote and illustrated Wild Flowers of the Northeastern States. The book contains about 300 drawings, about half of which were signed by Whiting with a "W."

== Life from the founding of the Deerfield Society ==
Antiquarian George Sheldon gave Whiting and Miller access to the collection of early to mid-18th century needlework he was assembling as a part of an assemblage of a broad range of local artefacts. After seeing examples of this embroidery at the Memorial Hall Museum and pieces in the possession of families in the area, she and Ellen Miller started to document designs they saw. They decided to make a replica of each piece, learning new stitches as needed. Finding that others were Interested in purchasing the works they were making, and being aware of John Ruskin's writings about village industries, they decided to form a group of individuals from Deerfield who would create distinctive works in the older style they had discovered in the museum. The Deerfield Society of Blue and White Needlework was founded in August 1896, the first of Deerfield's village industries which coalesced in 1899 to form the Deerfield Society of Arts and Crafts. Whiting's leadership included finding buyers, arranging for exhibits, and overseeing the production of the embroidered pieces. She, along with Miller, also was involved in designing and embroidering pieces of needlework. While their designs were based on colonial-era pieces, they modernized them, both in functionality and style. Their designs were more formal and less spontaneous that the earlier designs, with a sense of the Arts and Crafts aesthetic of the time. Works from the Society, at times including those of Whiting, were exhibited widely, including in New York, Boston, Detroit, New Orleans, Cincinnati, and also in Deerfield itself. The Blue and White Society participated in the 1915 World's Fair in San Francisco, the Panama-Pacific International Exposition, and was awarded a silver medal for both the design and the color of "embroideries of original design." Whiting possessed a gold medal from this Exposition, which might have been won for the Society's pomegranate head cloth. Later in life, Whiting had difficulty with her eyesight and with rheumatism in her fingers, and was not able to continue working with fine threads in delicate embroidery designs. The Society was able to continue during the First World War, despite shortages of materials, time to embroider, and orders, but in 1926 Whiting announced its disbanding. She died in 1946 in Deerfield.

== Works cited ==
- Cahill, Susan Elizabeth (2007). Crafting Culture, Fabricating Identity: Gender and Textiles in Limerick Lace, Clare Embroidery. Kingston, ON: Queen's University.
- Flynt, Suzanne L. (2012). Poetry to the earth : the arts & crafts movement in Deerfield. Kaplan, Wendy. Deerfield. pp. 27, 60. ISBN 978-1-55595-383-6. OCLC 857896280.
- Gordon, Beverly (Autumn 1998). "Spinning Wheels, Samplers, and the Modern Priscilla: The Images and Paradoxes of Colonial Revival Needlework". Winterthur Portfolio. 33 (2/3): 163–194. doi:10.1086/496744. JSTOR 496744. S2CID 162196456.
- Howe, Margery Burnham (1976). Deerfield embroidery. New York: Scribner. ISBN 0-684-14377-1. OCLC 1341513.
- Miller, Ellen; Whiting, Margaret C. (1895). Wild Flowers of the Northeastern States. New York: G. P. Putnam Sons.
- Moss, Gillian (1979). "Deerfield Blue and White: An Arts and Crafts Society". American Art & Antiques. 11 (5): 70–77.
