= Deerfield Society of Blue and White Needlework =

American arts and crafts society, 1896–1926

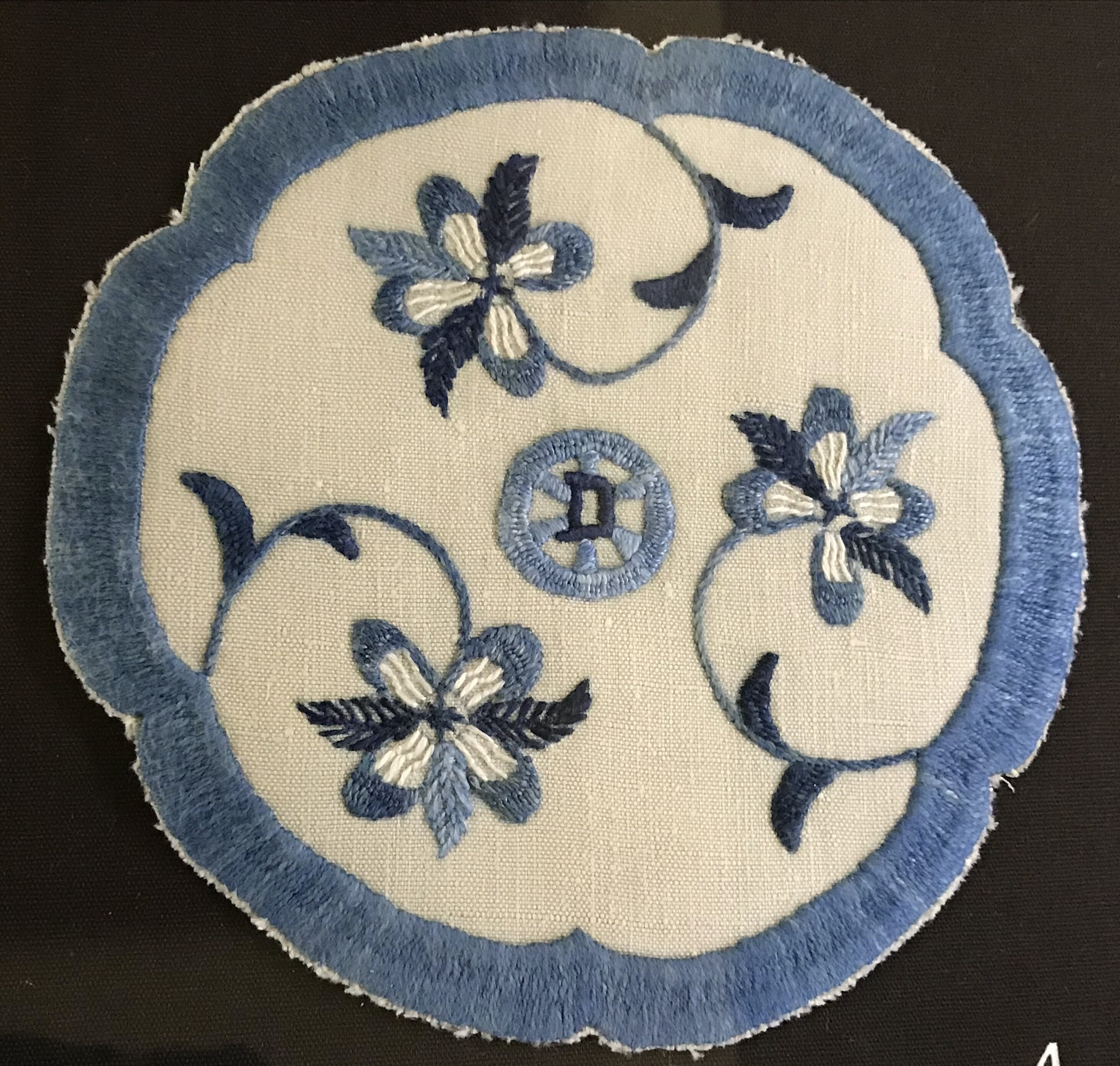
Embroidered doily, Deerfield Society of Blue and White Needlework, c. 1900, Memorial Hall Museum.

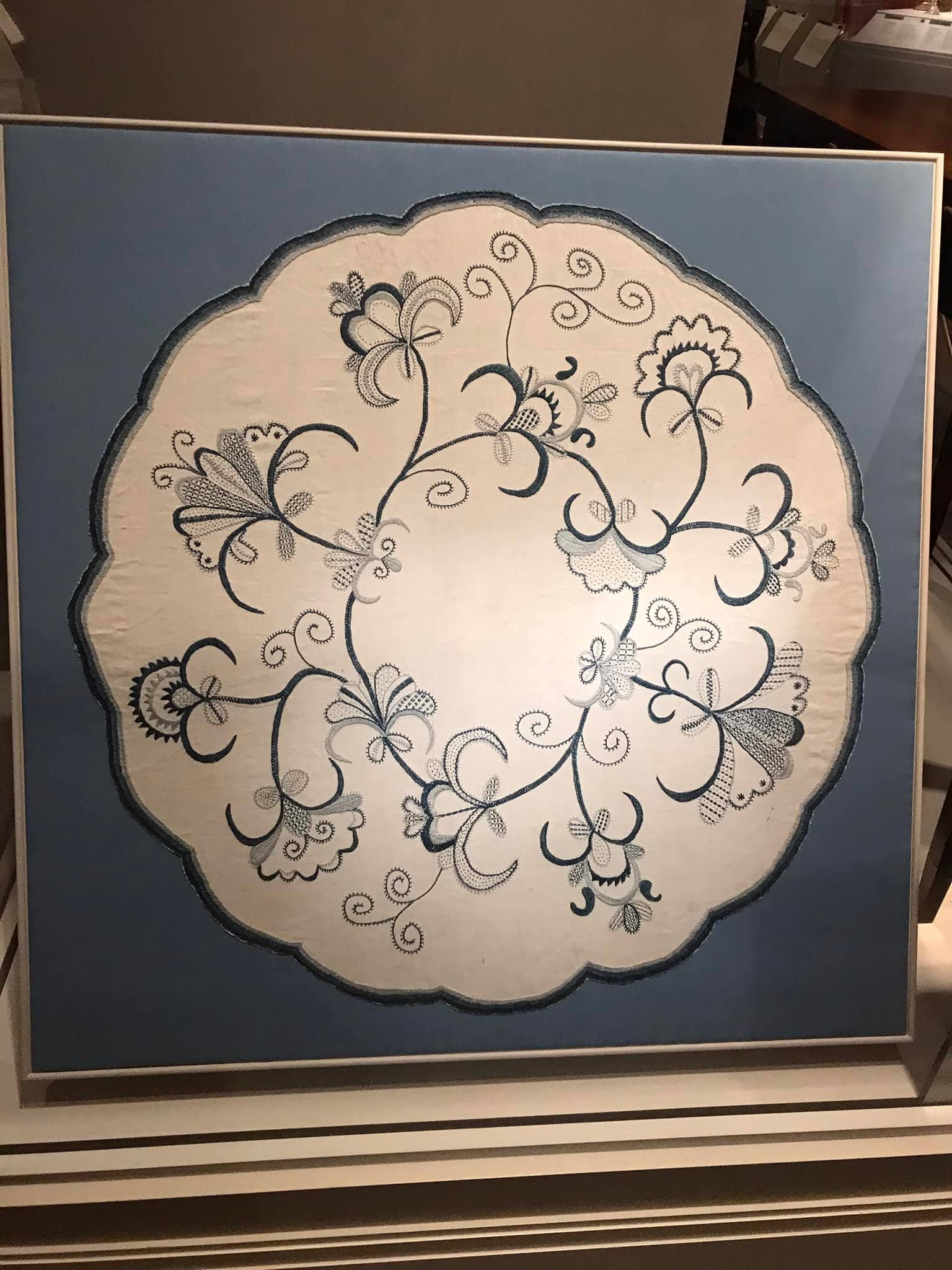
Table cover, Deerfield Society of Blue and White Needlework, Winterthur Museum, Garden and Library.

The Deerfield Society of Blue and White Needlework was founded in Deerfield, Massachusetts, in 1896 by Margaret C. Whiting and Ellen Miller. They formed the society in 1896 as a way to help residents boost the town's economy by reviving American needlework from the 1700s. It was inspired by the crewel embroidery of 18th-century women who had lived in the Deerfield, Massachusetts, area. Members of the Blue and White Society initially used the patterns and stitches from these earlier works, but because these new embroideries were not meant to replicate the earlier works, the embroidery soon deviated from the original versions with new patterns and stitches, and even the use of linen, rather than wool, thread. The society disbanded in 1926 for several reasons. Ellen Miller was in declining health; the trained stitchers were getting old and could not continue; Margaret C. Whiting's sight was fading; and, the design and quality of commercially produced items was increasing.

== Founding ==
The founders of the Society, Margaret C. Whiting and Ellen Miller, were descended from Colonial families, though they were not originally from Deerfield. The Miller family, with two daughters, had come to Deerfield from the nearby town of Hatfield in 1893, and in 1895 Mrs. Calvin Whiting arrived with her two daughters from Holyoke. The families were already friends, and Margaret and Ellen may have known each other while both were students at the New York Academy of Design.

By the middle of the 19th century, Deerfield's population was declining, with young people moving away. There was a focused interest amongst those who stayed on in Deerfield's history, and this was reflected in the establishment in 1870 of the Pocumtuck Valley Memorial Association, which actively collected local artifacts. These artifacts formed the basis of the Memorial Hall Museum, which opened to the public in Deerfield in 1880. This local interest in heritage served as the setting for the founding of the Deerfield Society of Blue and White Needlework.

Whiting and Miller carefully examined historical crewel embroidery of the area as found in the possession of residents and in Memorial Hall Museum. Using these pieces as learning tools, they mastered the stitches and motifs used by the colonial embroiderers. As their work became known, not only were people interested in buying it, but also learning to produce it. Whiting and Miller formed a cooperative, the Deerfield Society of Blue and White Needlework, in which the stitching members shared in the proceeds of the sales. Whiting had read John Ruskin's work, and was influenced by his ideas of design and social reform, yet made certain the Society maintained an emphasis on producing a quality product. Miller's interest in color was connected to Ruskin's interest.

== The business ==
Miller and Whiting hired workers—four to start—and provided them with the needed materials. They offered classes for beginners, in order to train additional qualified women. Eventually, between 25 and 30 women, ranging in age from 19 to 70, actively participated in the Society at a given time. Only women from the local area were accepted as Society members. Women were paid based on the work that they did. The time that would be needed to complete each element of each pattern was determined, so workers who were quick and precise would be at an advantage. The average earning was 20 cents per hour, and average annual earnings ranged from 75 cents to $139. Prices for completed items were based on the cost of the materials, the time to design a project, the stitching time, and the need to pay the designer. In 1904, costs ranged from $1.50 for a 6″ doily to table squares up to $30. These costs were many times more expensive than manufactured linens of high quality.

Initially, the Society members based their work on the historical examples. The designs were taken from those in the local museum and from those owned privately. Motifs were used as needed for design purposes, and therefore deviated from the source pieces. Motifs might be combined from different sources and used repeatedly but with a number of different stitches. The most frequently used stitch was New England Laid (also known as Romanian), which conserved thread, which would have been a precious commodity during the Colonial period. At the start, blue threads were used on white fabric. Different sources report that these threads were of linen or wool. Both Whiting and Miller, using their design training, soon developed new designs, and eventually started using threads in other colors, such as greens, madder (red), and fustic (yellow). Ellen Miller was the expert dyer, who tried out different dyes and mordants, kept extensive records of her efforts, and kept swatches in sunlight to check lightfastness over a six-month period. They experimented with appliqué and cross-stitch. Works emanating from the Society were trademarked with a letter "D" in the center of a spinning wheel.

== Arts and Crafts movement ==
The Arts and Crafts movement influenced the Deerfield Society both in its organization and its use of materials. The Society engaged in hand craftsmanship, something that was waning in the Industrial Age. In connection with this rejection of mass-produced materials, members of the Society sought out handmade materials. Whiting and Miller used vegetable dyes in order to create the colors of the wool threads, and handwoven linen fabric was bought for use as the background from Berea College and weavers in Vermont and Georgia.

== Influence ==
The Society's founding had an impact on other craft revivals in Deerfield. In 1899 the Deerfield Society of Arts and Crafts was created, which provided a structure for individuals in the town working in a number of crafts: baskets were woven by two groups, one that called themselves the Deerfield Basket Makers and another at the north end of town, the Pocumtuck Basket Makers. Individuals worked with iron, silver and copper, and photography, and wove rag rugs and linens.

The founder of the New Hampshire Saffron and Indigo Society, Martha G. Stearns, lived near Deerfield as a girl, and remembered seeing members of the Deerfield Society of Blue and White Needlework at work on embroidery projects. Stearns, who wrote the book Homespun and Blue about New England needlework, organized the Saffron and Indigo Society as an offshoot of the League of New Hampshire Arts and Crafts. Its goal was "to encourage needlework and to stimulate native designs."

== Demise ==
The Society's work slowed down during the First World War, when linen was hard to get, the Society's workers shifted focus to contributing to the war effort, and tastes were changing. It managed to carry on until 1926, when it disbanded. There were multiple reasons for this: Miller was in poor health; Whiting was losing her eyesight; and the embroiderers contributing the finished items were aging. In addition, the design and quality of commercially produced items was increasing.
