= Electa =

Electa is a feminine given name. Notable people with the given name include:

- Mary Electa Allen (1858–1941), American photographer; co-founder of the Deerfield Society of Blue and White Needlework
- Electa Arenal (1935–1969), Mexican artist
- Electa Johnson (1909–2004), American author, lecturer, adventure and sail training pioneer
- Electa Amanda Wright Johnson (1838–1929), American philanthropist
- Electa Quinney (1798–1885), Mohican; member of the Stockbridge-Munsee Community
- Electa Nobles Lincoln Walton (1824–1908), American educator, lecturer, writer and suffragist
- Electa Matilda Ziegler (1841–1932), American philanthropist
