= Ellen Miller (artist) =

Ellen Miller (1854-1929) was one of the founders of the Deerfield Society of Blue and White Needlework, with Margaret C. Whiting. She was a painter, designer, author, and needleworker. She was particularly skilled with dyeing, a talent she developed and practiced in her work for the Deerfield Society.

== Life prior to the founding of the Deerfield Society ==
With her parents and sister Margaret, Ellen Miller moved to Deerfield from Hatfield, Massachusetts in 1893. The Millers moved into a 1710 house built on the site of a house that had been destroyed by fire in the 1704 Deerfield Massacre. Ellen Miller and Margaret C. Whiting both studied at the National Academy of Design, and were pupils of Robert Crannell Minor in the summer of 1884. In 1895, Miller and Whiting together wrote and illustrated Wild Flowers of the Northeastern States.

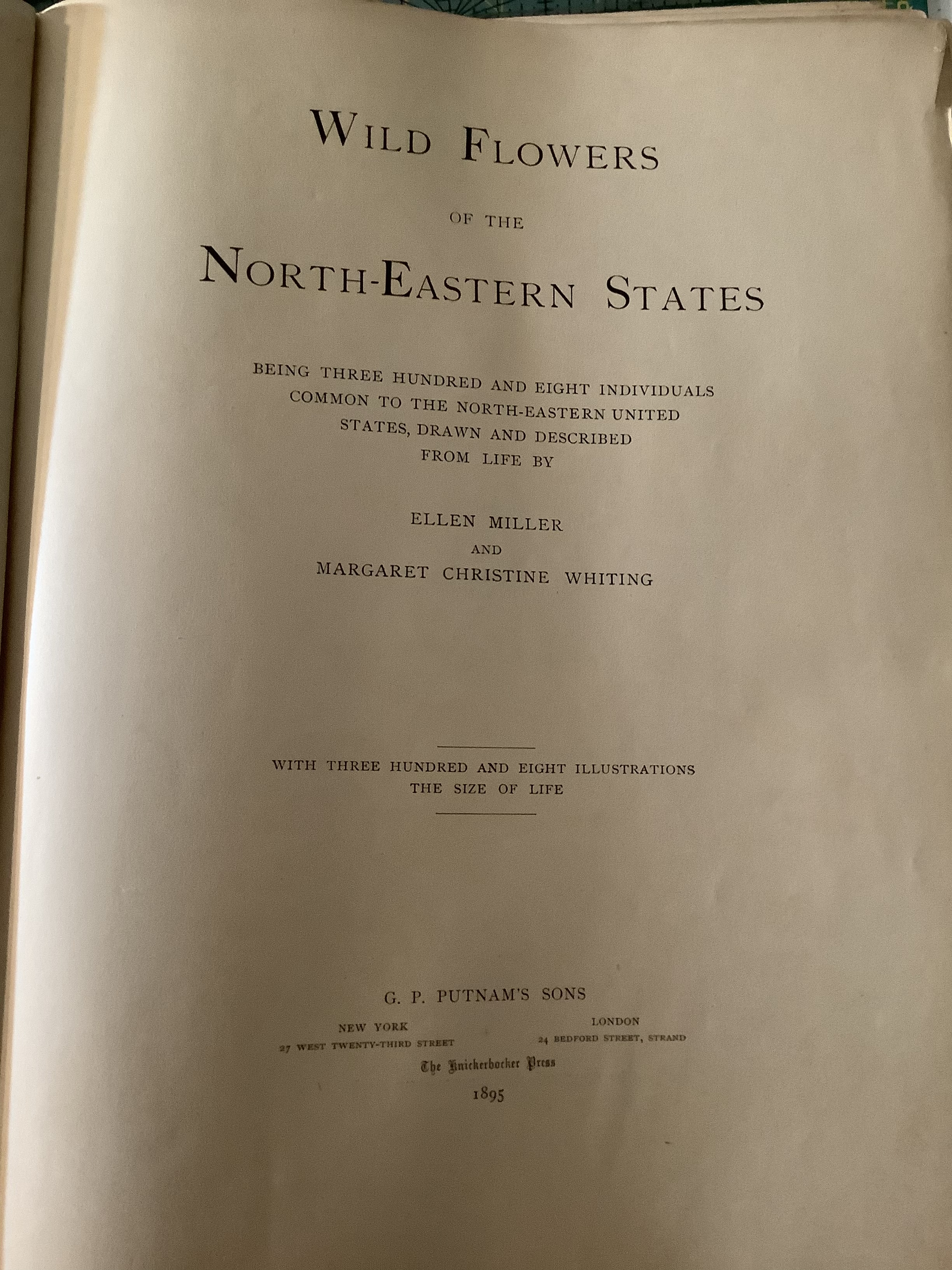
Title page of Wild Flowers of the North-Eastern States by Miller and Whiting, 1895

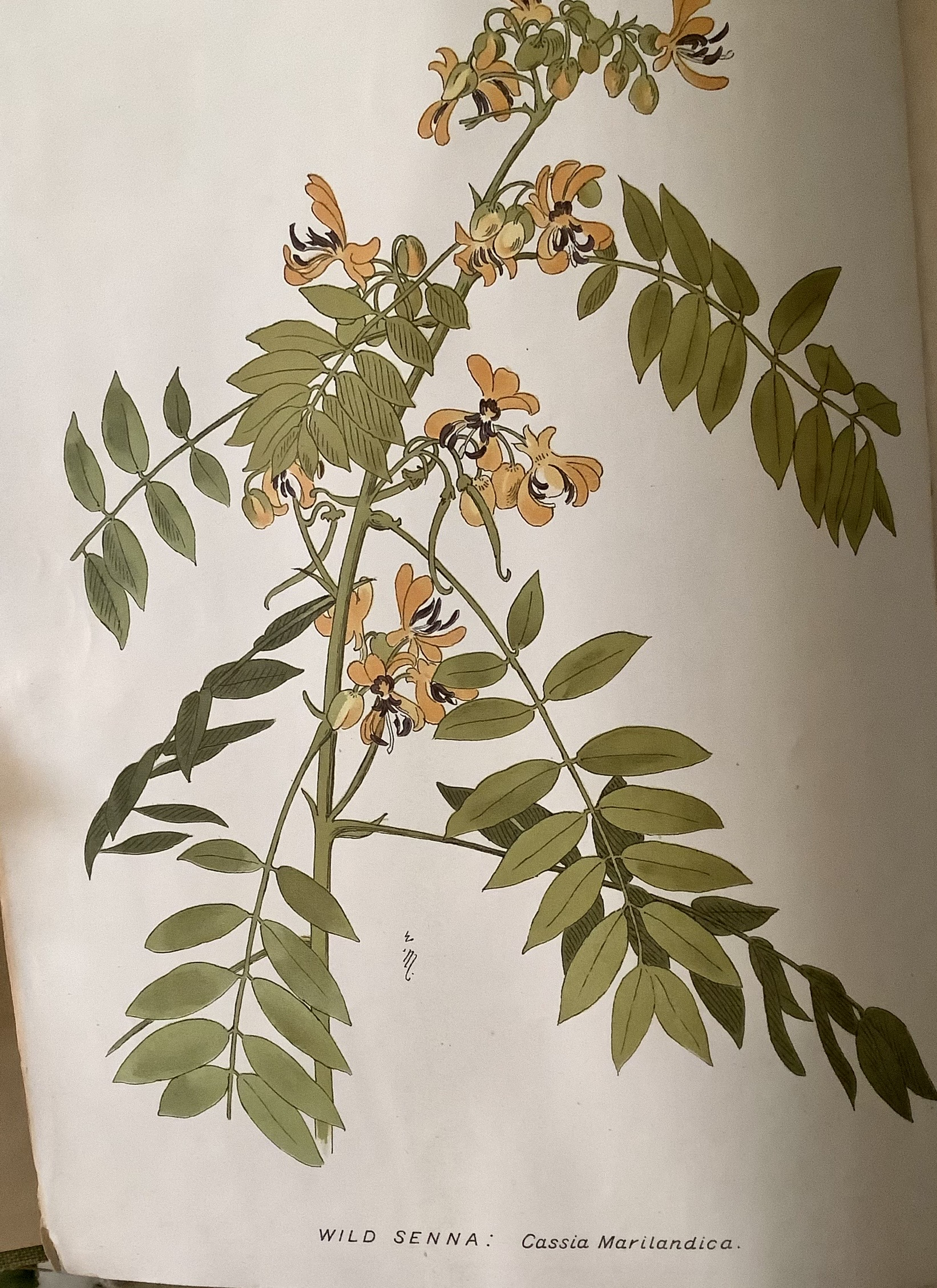
Frontispiece illustration by Ellen Miller of Wild Senna in Wild Flowers of the North-Eastern States

== Life from the founding of the Deerfield Society ==
Miller and Margaret C. Whiting became fascinated by the old embroidery they found at Memorial Hall Museum in Deerfield, spending time to learn the stitches they were unfamiliar with. They rode around the area via horse and carriage in order to find scenes for sketching, and were able to ask people they came to know about old embroidery they owned. They were occasionally able to buy pieces, but otherwise might pay for the privilege of tracing the design. As they worked on pieces based on the old samples, their skills increased and others expressed interest in buying their work. This inspired them to turn the work into a village industry using the model John Ruskin promoted. This became the Deerfield Society of Blue and White Needlework, which was founded in 1898. As the Society became more organized, a small room in the front of the Miller house was made into a showroom for the group's products.

Miller became increasing interested in dyeing the yarns and threads used in the work of the Society. While both she and Whiting became familiar with indigo dyeing, Miller went further, using both natural native dyes such as walnut, butternut and sumac, as well as imported natural dyes, like madder, fustic, and cutch. She kept meticulous records of her dyeing processes and recipes, and also conducted lightfastness tests. She also experimented with mordants and overdyeing. In addition, Miller designed patterns for items that were stitched and sold by Society members, calling upon her fine art background. She and Whiting were influenced both by the historical patterns, but also by more contemporary trends.

World War I caused orders for their products to fall off, and it became harder to get the linen background fabric that they used. The showroom in the Miller house closed, and Ellen and her sister Margaret moved in with Margaret Whiting. When the Society disbanded in 1926, Miller's health was declining. She died in 1929 in Deerfield.
