= Mary Allen =

Mary Allen or Allan may also refer to:

- Mary Wood-Allen (1841–1908), American doctor, social reformer, lecturer, and writer
- Mary Electa Allen (1858–1941), American photographer
- Mary Allen Wright (née Allen, 1868–1948), American politician, member of the Idaho House of Representatives
- Mary Allan (British academic) (1869–1947), British academic, principal of Homerton College, Cambridge
- Mary Hayes Allen (1875–1935), American educator
- Mary Sophia Allen (1878–1964), Welsh-born suffragette who was an early police woman and a far right leader
- Aileen Allen (Mary Aileen Allen, 1888–1950), American diver who competed in the 1920 Summer Olympics
- Mary Cecil Allen (1893–1962), Australian artist, writer and lecturer
- Mary Parsons Reid Allan (1917–2002), Scottish artist
- Mary Belle Allen (1922–1973), American botanist and chemist
- Mary Allen Wilkes (née Allen, born 1937), American computer programmer and hardware engineer
- Mary Love (Mary Ann Allen, 1943–2013), American singer
- Mary Allen (arts administrator) (born 1951), British writer, broadcaster, arts administrator and management consultant
- Elyse Allan (Mary Elyse Allan, born 1956/7), Canadian businesswoman
- Mary Cecelia Allen, American writer and writing coach
- Mary Allen (politician), American politician from New Hampshire

== See also ==
- Mary Allen West (1837–1892), American journalist, educator, superintendent of schools, and temperance worker
- Mary Edly-Allen, American politician
