= Robert Minor (disambiguation) =

Robert Minor (1884–1952) was a political cartoonist, journalist and leading member of the American Communist Party.

Robert Minor may also refer to:

- Robert Crannell Minor (1839–1904), American artist
- Robert Lee Minor (born 1944), American stunt performer and actor
