= Madeline Yale Wynne =

American artist and writer (1847–1918)

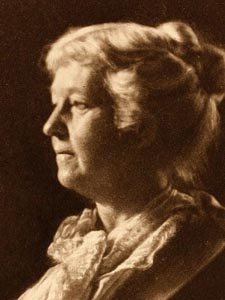
- Born: September 25, 1847; Newport, New York, US
- Died: January 4, 1918 (aged 70); Asheville, North Carolina, US
- Children: Philip Henry; Sydney Yale
- Parent(s): Linus Yale Jr. Katherine Brooks.
- Family: Yale

Madeline Yale Wynne (September 25, 1847 − January 4, 1918) was an American artist, teacher, writer, and philanthropist. She became the first President of Deerfield Society of Arts and Crafts, and a founding member of the Chicago Arts and Crafts Society. She was also a member of the Social Register of Chicago.

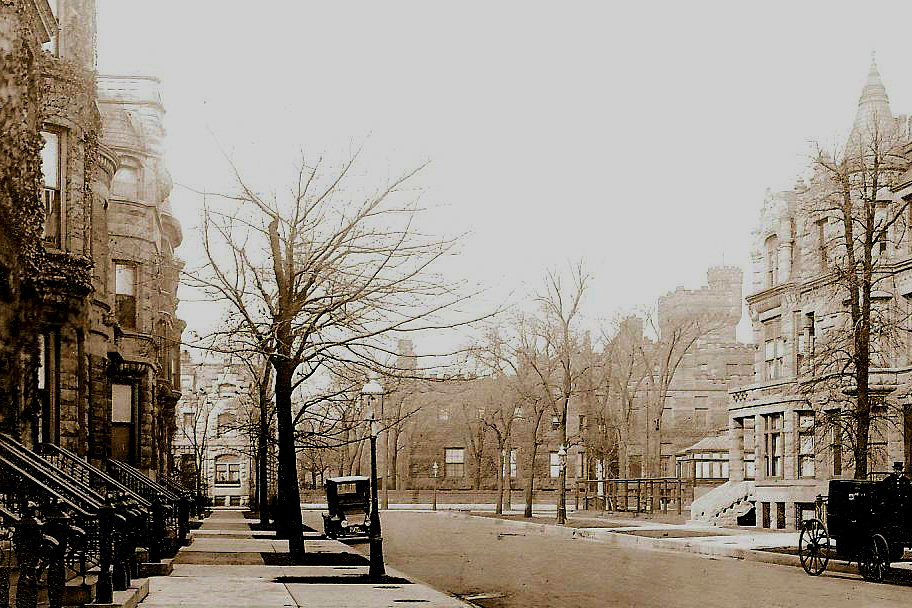
Ritchie Court, Chicago, 1880, Madeline Yale Wynne lived with her brother Julian at 9 Ritchie Place.

== Early life ==
Madeline was born in Newport, New York, the daughter of Linus Yale, Jr., and Katherine (Catherine) Brooks, members of the Yale family. Her brothers were John B. Yale and Julian L. Yale, both members of the Union League of New York. Her brother John was married to Marie Louise, daughter of U.S. Treasury Secretary Hugh McCulloch, who was the main financier of the American Civil War for Abraham Lincoln. Her uncle was Congressman Halbert S. Greenleaf, and her aunt was Jean Brooks Greenleaf, president of the New York State Woman's Suffrage Association.

In 1865, when she was 18, Madeline married to Senator Henry Winn, son of Senator Reuben Winn. Henry Winn was a graduate from Yale, then Harvard, and had been previously Major during the Civil War, assistant Attorney General, then personal Secretary to Senator George Sumner, before becoming Senator, and his father was a postmaster.

In the early 1860s, her husband, Senator Winn, founded with his in-laws Linus Yale Jr. and John Brooks Yale, the Yale & Winn Manufacturing Company, which became a successful enterprise, and received an award from Napoleon III's Universal Exposition of Paris in 1867. He tried to do business in South America, but his venture proved unsuccessful, and his ship the Caribbean was wrecked in the ocean and uninsured. He later established a law practice in Massachusetts when he became Senator in 1877, and became Mayor of Malden in 1892.

== Career ==
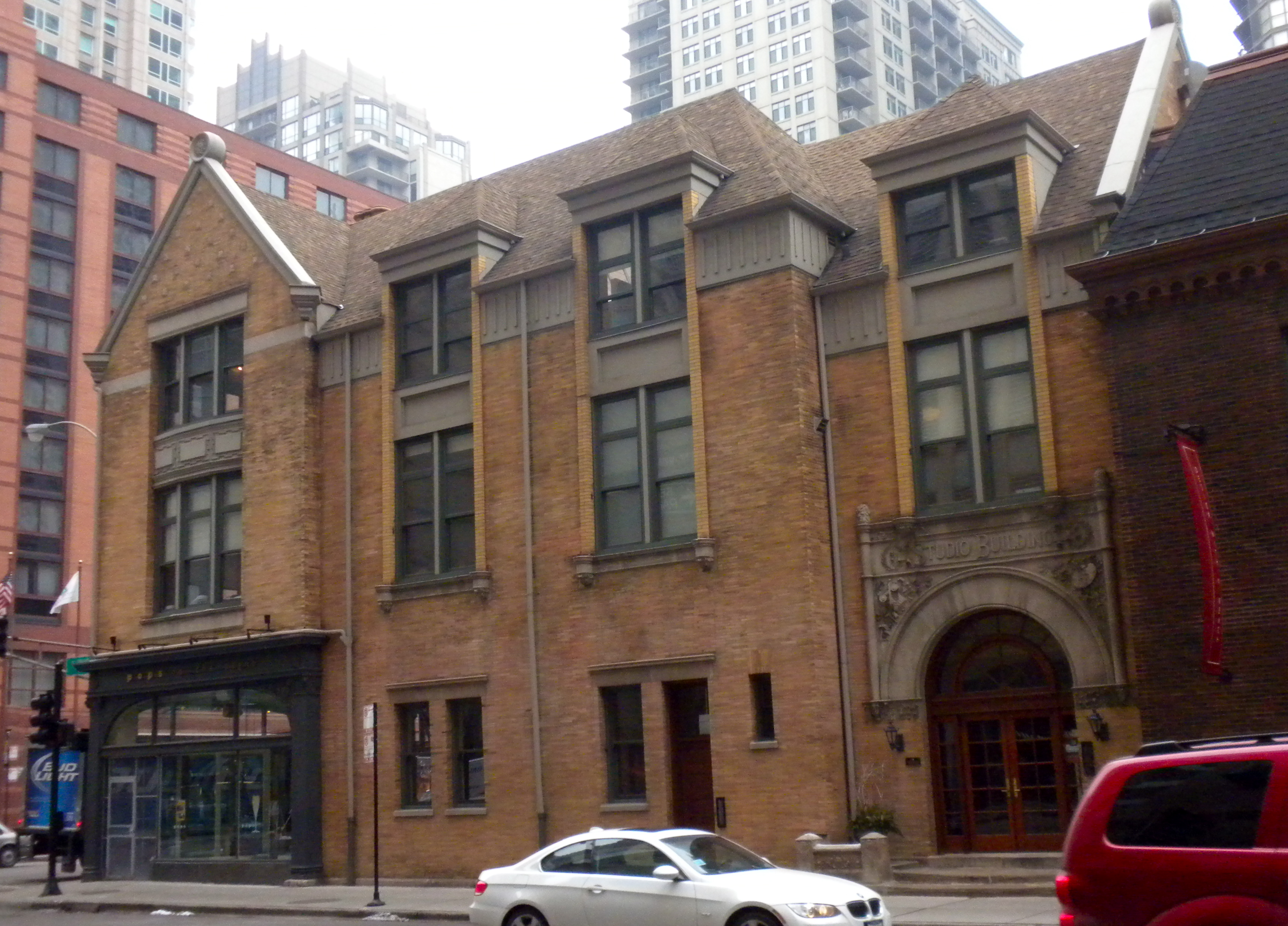
Tree Building of Chicago, where Madeline Yale Wynne had a studio for her art

Having been schooled in the technical arts by her father, Madeline studied painting at the Museum of Fine Arts, Boston during 1877−1878, at the Art Students League of New York in early 1880, and later in Europe. In the fall of 1880, she went on a tour to Europe, visiting Athens, Florence, Madrid, Paris, Venice, and Vienna, meeting with French painter Thomas Couture.

While in Athens, she sketched the Acropolis, and was invited to dine with German archeologist Heinrich Schliemann, but could not attend. During the 1880s, while visiting Florence, she also met painter Frank Duveneck and fellow craftsman Annie Cabot Putnam, of the Cabot and Putnam family. The two became lifelong partners, initially sharing a studio in Boston.

After having been a resident of Shelburne Falls for most of her adult life, in 1885, Madeline began spending her summers with Annie at the village of Deerfield, Massachusetts. Assisted by her son Philip, she worked with Annie to restore and refurbish the historic Willard House, which they dubbed the "Manse". This 1768 Georgian mansion was the former home of the Reverend Samuel Willard.

In 1895, she turned to writing; Madeline's supernatural short story "The Little Room" was published in Harper's Magazine and was well received. It was later released in a collection of Wynne's short stories called The Little Room and Other Stories, along with The Sequel to the Little Room. (More recently, "The Little Room" appeared in the 2009 horror compendium, American Fantastic Tales, edited by Peter Straub.) She wrote for Atlantic Monthly, Harper's Monthly, Home Beautiful, and various other publications.

Madeline helped to found and lead the Deerfield Society of Arts and Crafts in 1901, which became an umbrella organization for the arts movement in the village. She became involved with Hull House, had a studio in Chicago's Tree Building, and was a member of the International Association of Lyceum Clubs in London, England. Wynne served as the curator as the movement produced a broad array of artistry, including jewelry, photography, weaving, basketry, rugs, and furniture.

She and Annie became very influential in developing arts and crafts in the community, with Madeline organizing tours of the village's craftwork and arranging speaking engagements. The two women were expert metal smiths in their own right.

== Family ==
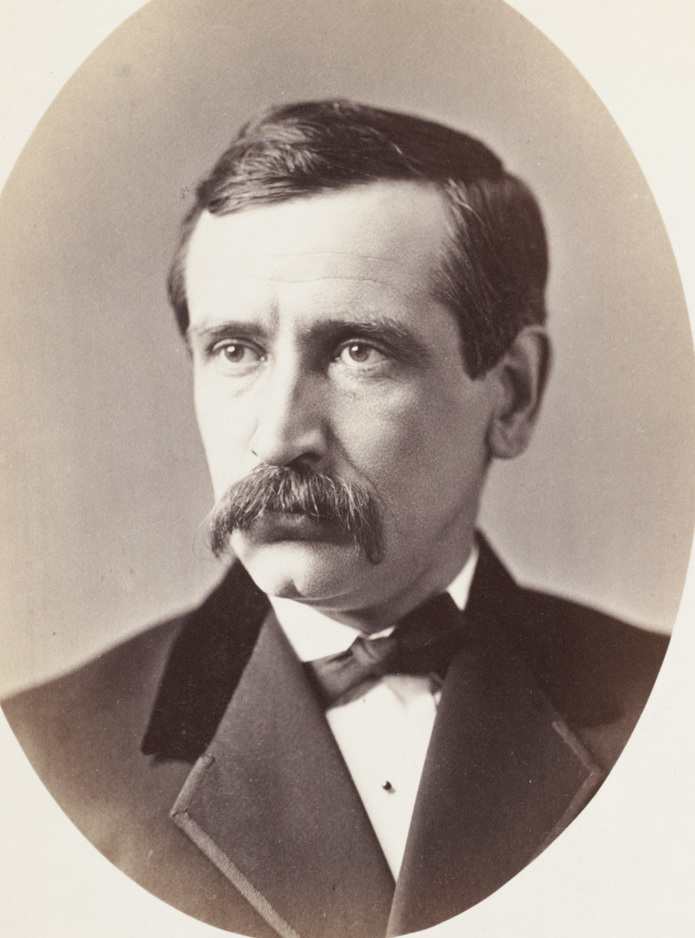
Senator Henry Winn

With Senator Henry Winn, they had two sons—Philip Henry, born January 17, 1868, and Sydney Yale, born September 6, 1870—but the marriage came to an end in 1874.

Philip Henry Wynne was an engineer from MIT, and went on working for the Illinois Steel Company, which became U.S. Steel after the acquisition of Carnegie Steel, and for Thomson-Houston Electric Company, which became General Electric. He thereafter operated his own business, designing scientific apparatus, such as ore separators and galvanometers, still in use in various mines.

Sydney Yale Wynne (1870-1915), was one of the first Doctors of West Point, New York, and was the father of Sydney Julian Wynne, Lieutenant commander in the U.S. Navy. He graduated from Harvard and was also the grandfather of Lieutenant Colonel Theodore Fite, son of Colonel John H. Fite. Following her divorce, she changed the spelling of her last name to Wynne.
