= Jennie Maria Arms Sheldon =

American author, scientist and researcher

- Born: July 29, 1852; Bellows Falls, Vermont, US
- Died: January 15, 1938 (aged 85); Deerfield, Massachusetts, US
- Education: Massachusetts Institute of Technology
- Spouse: George Sheldon
- Scientific career
- Fields: Zoology; entomology; history
- Workplaces: Boston Society of Natural History; Deerfield Memorial Hall Museum
- Academic advisors: Alpheus Hyatt

Jennie Maria Arms Sheldon (July 29, 1852 – January 15, 1938) was an American entomologist, educator, historian, author, and museum curator. She worked closely with zoologist Alpheus Hyatt at the Boston Society of Natural History, and she was the curator of the Memorial Hall Museum in Deerfield, Massachusetts, for a quarter of a century.

== Biography ==
Jennie Maria Arms was born in 1852 in Bellows Falls, Vermont, to Eunice Stratton (Moody) Arms and George Albert Arms, who ran a hardware store. She attended high school in Greenfield, Massachusetts, and went on to study at Mrs. Badger's School in Boston (1873–76) and the Massachusetts Institute of Technology (1877–79). She entered MIT the year that the Woman's Laboratory opened under the direction of chemist Ellen Swallow Richards. Although she entered with the class of 1881, she did not finish her degree.

For two years beginning in 1879 she was a special student to the zoologist and palaeontologist Alpheus Hyatt at the Boston Society of Natural History (the precursor to the Boston Museum of Science). Thereafter, she continued as his assistant for another quarter of a century. For some thirteen years she also taught at Pauline Agassiz Shaw's school in Boston.

Sheldon published on zoological, geological, and historical subjects, including Insecta (1890), a survey of the insects coauthored with her mentor Alpheus Hyatt. Hyatt and Sheldon were the first to describe the scorpion flies (Mecoptera) and mayflies (Ephemeroptera).

In 1897, she married George Sheldon, a politician, judge, and historian, after which she divided her time between Boston and George's home town of Deerfield, Massachusetts. Together they catalogued the collections at Deerfield's Memorial Hall Museum—housed in a building that was formerly the home of Deerfield Academy—and Sheldon served as the museum's curator from 1913 until his death. She published several pamphlets on subjects related to the museum collections, as well as an historical biography, The Life of a New England Boy, based on her father's early life.

Sheldon belonged to several scientific organizations, including the American Association for the Advancement of Science and the National Science Club. She was also involved in women's rights organizations such as the Naples Table Association for Promoting Lab Research by Women, the Massachusetts Woman Suffrage Association, and the Boston Equal Suffrage Association for Good Government.

She died in Deerfield in 1938. One of her bequests was to Deerfield Academy to found the George Albert Arms Science Building in memory of her father.

== Publications ==
Solo authored

- Life of a New England Boy (1896)
- Concretions from the Champlain Clays of the Connecticut Valley (1900)
- Guide to the Invertebrata of the Synoptic Collection in the Museum of the Boston Society of Natural History (1905)
- Deerfield Memorial Stones (pamphlet, 1905)
- John Sheldon and the Old Indian House Homestead (pamphlet, 1911)
- Walter Titus Avery (pamphlet, 1912)
- The Old Indian House at Deerfield, Mass.: And the Effort Made in 1847 to Save It from Destruction (1922)
- Pitted Stones (1925)
- The Sycamore, Elms, and Maples of Old Deerfield (1930)
- Observation Lessons on Animals: Including Drawings and Descriptive, Comparative, and Inferential Work of Children, for the Use of Teachers of Primary and Grammar Schools (1931)

Co-authored

- Insecta (1898, with Alpheus Hyatt)
- Newly Exposed Geologic Features Within the Old "8000 Acre Grant" (1903, with George Sheldon)
- The Rev. John Williams House (1918, with George Sheldon)
