= Frances Stebbins Allen =

American photographer

- Born: August 10, 1854; Deerfield, Massachusetts, US
- Died: February 14, 1941 (aged 86)
- Resting place: Deerfield, Massachusetts, US
- Known for: Photographer

Frances Stebbins Allen (1854–1941) was an American photographer.

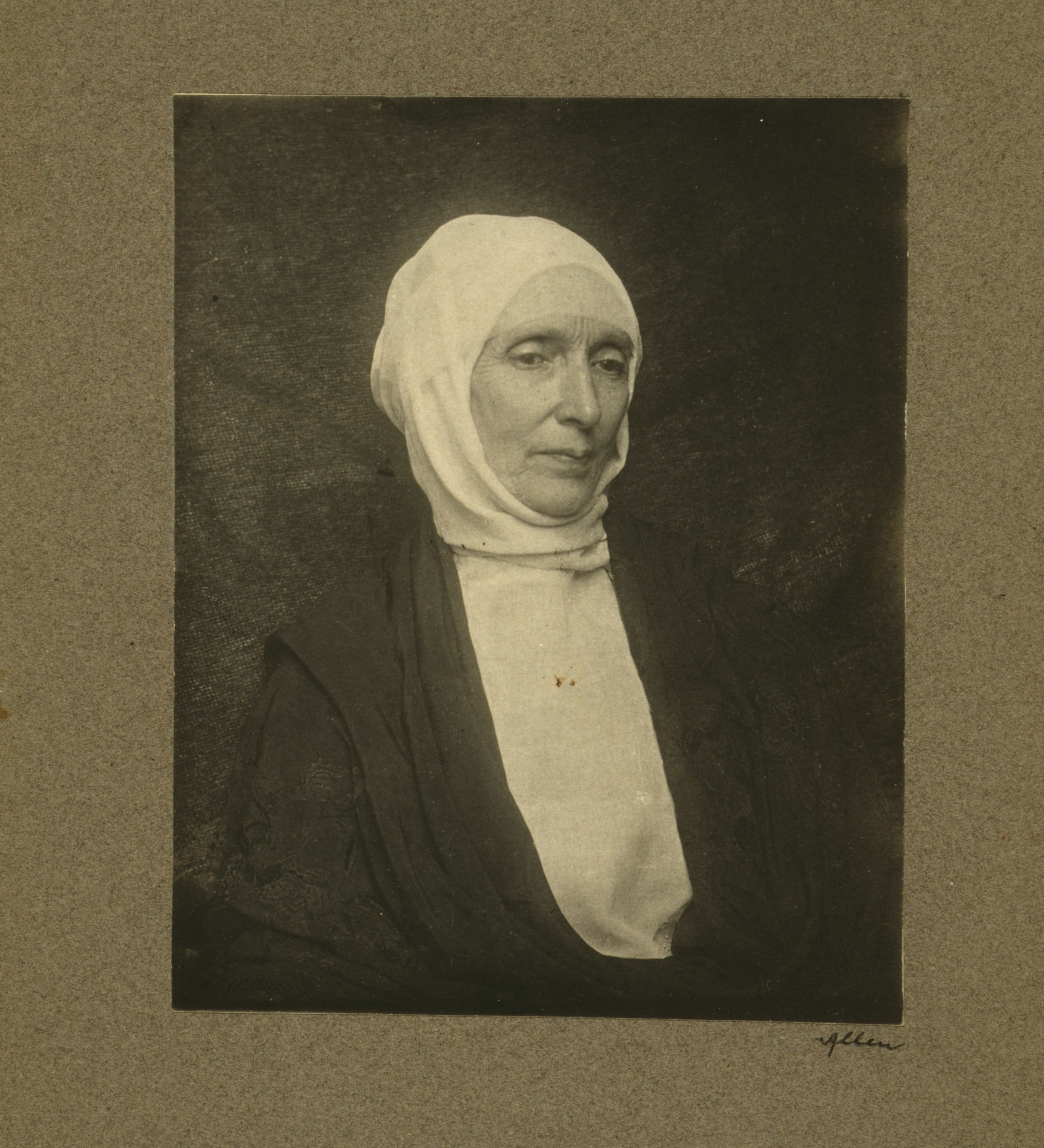
A Holbein Woman by Frances Stebbins Allen and Mary Electra Allen

Allen was born in Deerfield, Massachusetts to Josiah Allis Allen and Mary, née Stebbins. She and her sister, Mary Electa Allen (1858–1941), were schoolteachers who left teaching when they became deaf in their thirties.

Their deafness led Allen and her sister to take up photography. By 1895, they were permanently exhibiting and selling their prints from their family's ancestral home. Many of their works were never attributed to one sister or the other, but to "the Misses Allen." Many of their idyllic images harken back to an idealized version of the region's colonial history. In 1899, the Allen sisters joined Deerfield's Arts and Crafts Movement, and began to document the works of its earliest members. In 1907, Frances Allen was elected Director of the Society of Deerfield Industries.

== Family and education ==
Allen was one of four children born to Josiah and Mary Allen in the 1850s. She attended Deerfield Academy and then the State Normal School teacher's college in Westfield, Massachusetts.
