= George Sheldon (preservationist) =

American preservationist and politician

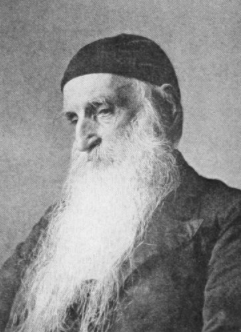

Member of the Massachusetts Senate
- In office 1872

Member of the Massachusetts House of Representatives
- In office 1867

Personal details
- Born: November 30, 1818 Deerfield, Massachusetts
- Died: December 23, 1916 (aged 98) Deerfield, Massachusetts
- Party: Republican
- Spouses: Susan Stewart Stearns (m. 1844; died 1881) Jennie Maria Arms (m. 1897)
- Education: Deerfield Academy
- Occupation: Historian, politician

George Sheldon (1818–1916) led one of the first historic preservation societies in the United States.

== Biography ==
He was born in Deerfield, Massachusetts on November 30, 1818. He was educated at Deerfield Academy, and worked as a farmer. In 1844 he married Susan Stewart Stearns of Dummerston, Vermont, and from 1853 to 1857 lived in Chicopee, Massachusetts. In 1857 he was appointed Justice of the Peace at Deerfield and in 1867 was elected as a representative to the General Court, the state legislature of Massachusetts. In 1872 he was elected state senator. His first wife died in 1881. In 1897 he remarried; his second wife was the scientist and historian Jennie Maria Arms.

Sheldon's interest in history and historical preservation began in 1848, when Deerfield's Old Indian House (the first home occupied by the Sheldon Family in Deerfield) was demolished despite the objections of local residents. Sheldon, along with others, were able to preserve only the door of the house and some architectural fragments. In 1868, he and others erected a monument to honor the town's Civil War soldiers. Two years later, they decided to mark the spot where Eunice Williams, the wife of John Williams, was murdered during the 1704 Deerfield Massacre.

From that, the Pocumtuck Valley Memorial Association was born in 1870, and Sheldon would serve as its president until his death at his home in Deerfield on December 23, 1916. The Association founded the Memorial Hall Museum, which houses much of Sheldon's collection, in 1880. The Association, which took its name from the original inhabitants of Deerfield (and the name of their village, located near the site of the town), was one of the first historical preservation societies in the country. Sheldon was named president of the Association, a post he held to his death. Although he split his time between Deerfield and Boston, he remained an important voice in town issues and a dynamic leader of the Memorial Association. In 1895 he published the History of Deerfield, a comprehensive, two-volume history of the town that included an extensive genealogy of its residents.

== Interpretations ==
=== Indigenous history ===
University of Pennsylvania professor Margaret Bruchac has argued that George Sheldon, amongst other Euro-American historians of the 1800s, sought to deliberately obscure the Indigenous history of Deerfield. The Pocumtuck Valley Memorial Association's purpose was declared to "illustrate and perpetuate the history of the early settlers, and of the race which vanished before them", despite the dense documentation of continued indigenous presence in the Connecticut River valley, and the visitation of Indigenous descendants of the Pocumtuc Confederacy to Deerfield within Sheldon's lifetime.

Writing in 2011 regarding the Memorial Hall Museum, Bruchac states that "there was no space dedicated to living Indians; there was only room for the dead... Memorial Hall housed deeds, tomahawks, skeletons, and other icons that signified Deerfield’s victories over the original inhabitants." & "These installations depicted a divide between “the pioneers of this valley” as people of “courage and energy, faith and fortitude,” and “the savage” who had to be expelled before civilization could manifest itself." As the historian Neal Salisbury observed, the random arrangement of indigenous objects made their cultural context irrelevant, since “the overall effect was to render Indians as merely one category of white experience, denying them a meaningful history and a humanity of their own.”

== See also ==
- 1872 Massachusetts legislature
