= Mary Cecelia Allen =

American writer

- Born: Northampton, Massachusetts, U.S.
- Education: University of Massachusetts 1976; University of Iowa 1988
- Occupations: Author, writing coach
- Writing career
- Language: English
- Years active: –present
- Genres: Memoirs, essays
- Notable work: The Rooms of Heaven
- Website: www.maryallenwriter.com

Mary Allen is an author and writing coach living in Iowa City, Iowa. She is an MFA graduate of the Iowa Writers' Workshop and published her first memoir, The Rooms of Heaven, in 2000. She received an NEA fellowship in 2002.

== Personal life ==
Allen was born in Northampton, Massachusetts. Because her mother had postpartum mental illness, she grew up in the home of a foster family in Westhampton, Massachusetts. She received a bachelor's degree in English from the University of Massachusetts in 1976. She worked in publishing in Boston, at Little, Brown and Company, in the 1970s and '80s, then moved to Iowa City in 1986 to attend the Iowa Writers' Workshop and received an MFA in 1988. She has taught in the Nonfiction Writing Program at The University of Iowa. She makes a living as a writing coach. She has a blog called Harnessing Time, about making peace with time and learning how to use it as an asset instead of fighting with it like an enemy.

== Writing themes ==
Allen writes about spiritual and psychological healing. Her themes are love, addiction, codependency, the nature of life and death, and the ways our states of consciousness intersect with our experiences of reality. She has written about being the daughter of an abusive mother with maternal mental illness and about healing through EMDR (Eye Movement Desensitization and Reprocessing Therapy). She has spoken and written widely about issues affecting writers, including the challenge of finding time to write as well as the spiritual gifts of writing.

== Published works ==
Personal memoirs

- The Rooms of Heaven: A Story of Love, Death, Grief, and the Afterlife (2000).
- Awake in the Dream House (2014). Awarded a National Endowment for the Arts creative writing fellowship.
- The Deep Limitless Air: A Memoir in Pieces (2022).
