= Electa Nobles Lincoln Walton =

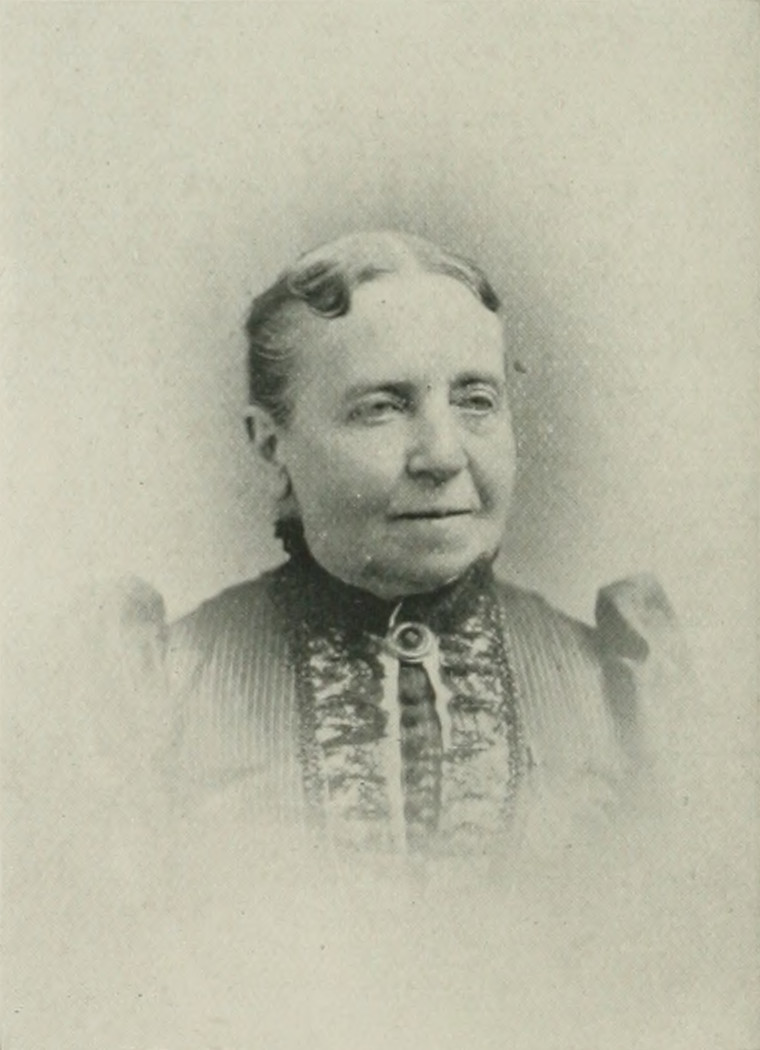
- Born: Electa Nobles Lincoln; May 12, 1824; Watertown, New York, US
- Died: March 15, 1908 (aged 83); Newton, Massachusetts, US
- Education: State Normal School in Lexington
- Occupations: Educator, Writer, Suffragist
- Spouse: George Augustus Walton (m. 1850)

Electa Nobles Lincoln Walton (née Electa Nobles Lincoln; 12 May 1824 – 1908) was an American educator, lecturer, writer, and suffragist from the U.S. state of New York. Though she was co-author of a series of arithmetic books, the publishers decided that her name should be withheld. She became an advocate for the enfranchisement of women. She was said to be the "first woman to administer a state normal school". She was an officer of the Massachusetts Woman Suffrage Association, an active member and director in the New England Women's Educational Club of Boston, and president of the West Newton Woman's Educational Club since its organization in 1880. Though not a prolific writer, she sometimes contributed to the press. She was an occasional lecturer upon literary and philanthropic subjects.

== Early years and education ==
Electa Nobles Lincoln was born in Watertown, New York, 12 May 1824. She was the youngest daughter of Martin and Susan Freeman Lincoln. On the paternal side, she was a descendant of Samuel Lincoln, who settled at Hingham, in 1637, and of his son Mordecai, who was born in Hingham in 1657. These two ancestors of Mrs. Walton were also ancestors of the President, Abraham Lincoln, who was of the same generation that she is—the seventh. Mrs. Walton's father, Martin Lincoln, was born in Cohasset in 1795. A teacher by profession, he taught in the public schools of Lancaster, also in the Lancaster Academy, and afterward for some years kept a private school in Boston. Mrs. Walton's mother, whose maiden name was Susan White Freeman, was the daughter of Adam and Margaret (White) Freeman. Adam Freeman, grandfather of Mrs. Walton, emigrated with a party from Frankfurt am Main about 1780, and settled in the locality then known as the "German Flats," afterward named Frankfort, New York. His wife, Margaret White Freeman, Mrs. Walton's maternal grandmother, was from Windsor, Vermont. Archibald White, Jr., and William White, who are on record as living in the town in 1786, were her brothers.

At the age of two, she removed to Lancaster with her family. She resided afterwards in Roxbury, and later in Boston. Under the tutoring of Dr. Nathaniel Thayer, of Lancaster, and Dr. George Putnam, of Roxbury, she studied the doctrines of Unitarianism. During the ministration of Rev. J. T. Sargent and under the impulse occasioned by the preaching of Rev. Theodore Parker, she devoted herself to religious work. Her first and principal teacher was her father. At the age of seventeen, she entered the State Normal School in Lexington, and was graduated.

== Career ==
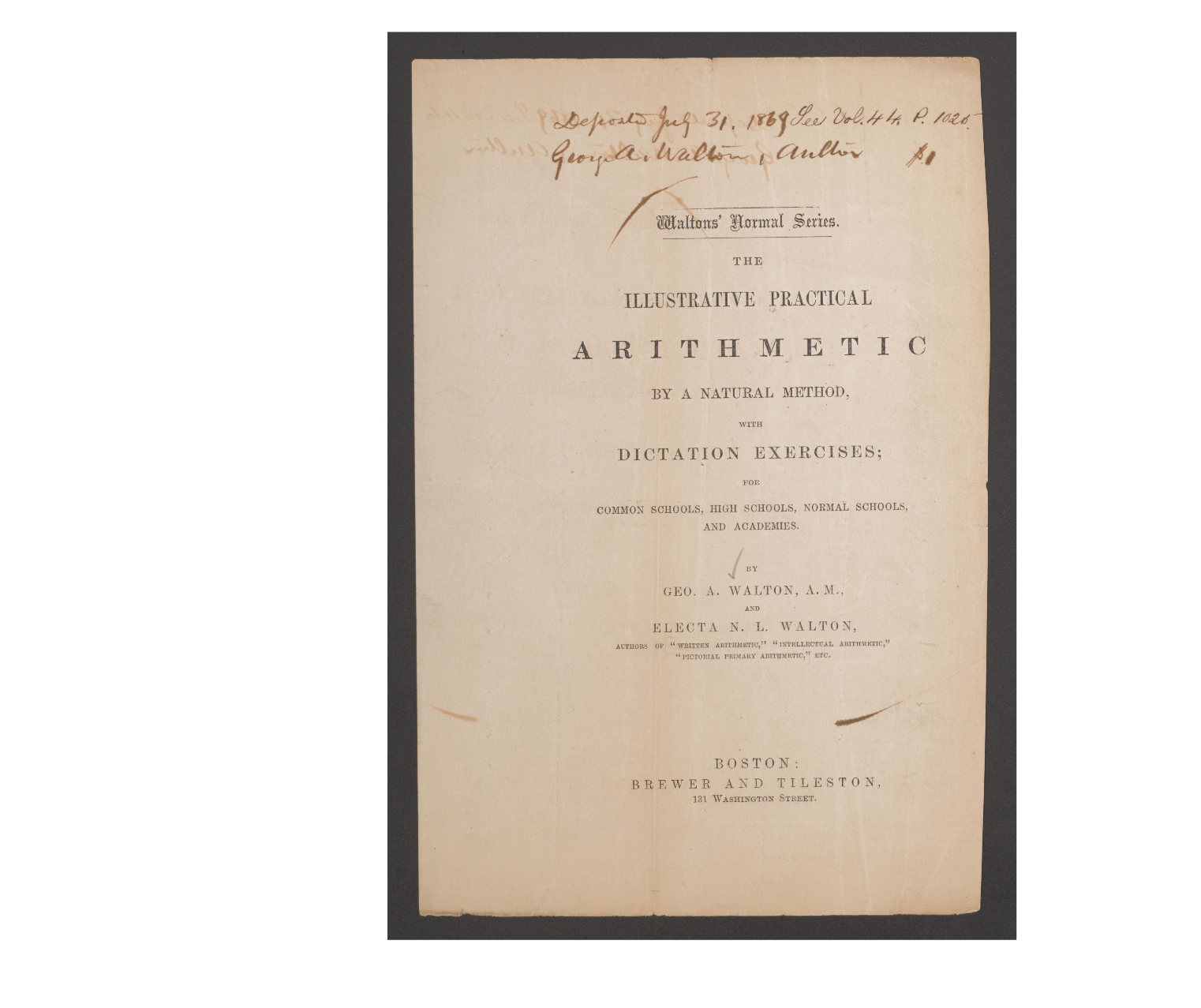
Illustrative Practical Arithmetic

In 1843, having completed the normal course of study and having received her diploma, she became an assistant in the Franklin Grammar School, Boston. After teaching there for a few weeks, she was appointed assistant in the Normal School, her alma mater, where she began to teach on May 7, 1843, five days before she turned 19. She retained her position as assistant at the State Normal School for seven years, one at Lexington and six at West Newton (when the school was removed in 1844), and served under three principals—the Rev. Cyrus Peirce, the Rev. Samuel Joseph May, and Eben S. Stearns. In the interregnum between the resignation of Peirce and the accession of Stearns, Lincoln served as principal of the school; and it was the expressed wish of Peirce that she should succeed him as permanent principal. Lincoln was thus the first woman in the United States to act as principal of a State Normal School, but to make her the permanent principal was too great an innovation to be seriously thought of by those in authority in that time.

She married George Augustus Walton, of Lawrence, in August, 1850, and for 18 years, they resided in Lawrence. After her marriage, Walton devoted her spare time to benevolent and philanthropic enterprises, and was a leader in church and charitable work. She received instruction in vocal culture from Professor James E. Murdock and William Russell. She was employed by Gen. George Armstrong Custer, conducting a teachers' institute of the graduating class in Hampton. During the American Civil War, turning the sympathies of the Lawrence people toward the Sanitary Commission, she aided in organizing the whole community into a body of co-laborers with the army in the field.

She was co-author with her husband of a series of arithmetics books. She believed in the equal rights of woman and that they should be credited for their work. Her beliefs were intensified by the decision of the publishers, that her name should be withheld as co-author of the arithmetics. From being simply a believer in the right of woman suffrage, she became an earnest advocate for the complete enfranchisement of woman. She was always a zealous advocate of temperance and during a residence in Westfield, held the office of president of the Woman's Christian Temperance Union of that town. After her removal to West Newton, she became actively interested in promoting woman suffrage, believing that through woman suffrage the cause of temperance and other reforms were best advanced. She was an officer of the Massachusetts Woman Suffrage Association, an active member and director in the New England Women's Educational Club of Boston, and president of the West Newton Woman's Educational Club since its organization in 1880. Though not a prolific writer, she sometimes contributed to the press. She was an occasional lecturer upon literary and philanthropic subjects.

Having received thorough instruction in vocal culture from Professors James E. Murdock and William Russell, she was for years employed as a teacher of reading and vocal training in the teachers' institutes of Massachusetts. She also taught in the State Normal Institutes of Virginia, and for five successive years, by invitation of General Armstrong, conducted a teachers' institute of the graduating class in Hampton.

== Private life ==
She married George Augustus Walton on August 27, 1850. At that time and for a number of years after, he was principal of the Oliver Grammar School in Lawrence, Massachusetts. Subsequently, as a teacher in teachers' institutes in New England, also in New York and Virginia, he became widely known and influential. For 25 years, from 1871, he was agent of the Massachusetts State Board of Education. Mr. Walton was a graduate of the Bridgewater Normal School. He received the degree of Master of Arts from Williams College. Born in South Reading (now Wakefield), Mass., February 18, 1822, son of James and Elizabeth (Bryant) Walton, he was a lineal descendant of the Rev. William Walton, whose services as minister of the gospel at Marblehead covered a period of 30 years, 1638–68.

The Waltons were the parents of five children, of whom three survived: Harriet Peirce, wife of Judge James R. Dunbar, of the Massachusetts Superior Court; Dr. George Lincoln Walton (Harv. Univ., A.B. 1875, M.D. 1880), neurologist, of Boston: and Alice Walton (Smith Coll., A.B. 1887; Cornell, Ph.D. 1892), who became associate professor of Latin and archaeology at Wellesley College.

Walton died on March 15, 1908, in Newton, Massachusetts.

== Selected works ==
- 1866, A pictorial primary arithmetic : on the plan of object-lessons (with G. A. Walton)
- 1869, An intellectual arithmetic : with an introduction (with G. A. Walton)
- 1869, The illustrative practical arithmetic by a natural method (with G. A. Walton)
- 1869, A key to The illustrative practical arithmetic (with G. A. Walton)
- 1871, A manual of arithmetic ... to which is appended a key to Waltons' Illustrative practical arithmetic (with G. A. Walton)
- 1914, Historical sketches of the Framingham State Normal School (with Eben S Stearns & Grace F Shepard)
