= Fustic =

Fustic is a common name for several plants and a yellow dye produced from these plants:

- Maclura tinctoria (dyer's mulberry or old fustic) and the yellow dye produced from its heartwood, principally the flavonol morin.
- Cotinus coggygria (smoke tree or young fustic) and the yellow dye produced from its wood, the flavonol, fisetin.
