= Mary Electa Allen =

American photographer

- Born: May 14, 1858; Deerfield, Massachusetts
- Died: February 18, 1941 (aged 82)
- Occupations: Photographer; Embroiderer; Writer

Mary Electa Allen (1858–1941) was an American photographer and co-founder of the Deerfield Society of Blue and White Needlework. She worked alongside her sister as a photographer from 1885 until 1920 capturing the life and landscape of Old Deerfield, among other subjects and paid commissions.

Her work was critical for the Deerfield Arts and Crafts movement which began in the late 19th century. She captured the life and work of the artists and craftspeople, wrote extensively about the movement's progress, and illustrated their work through photographs in magazine articles.

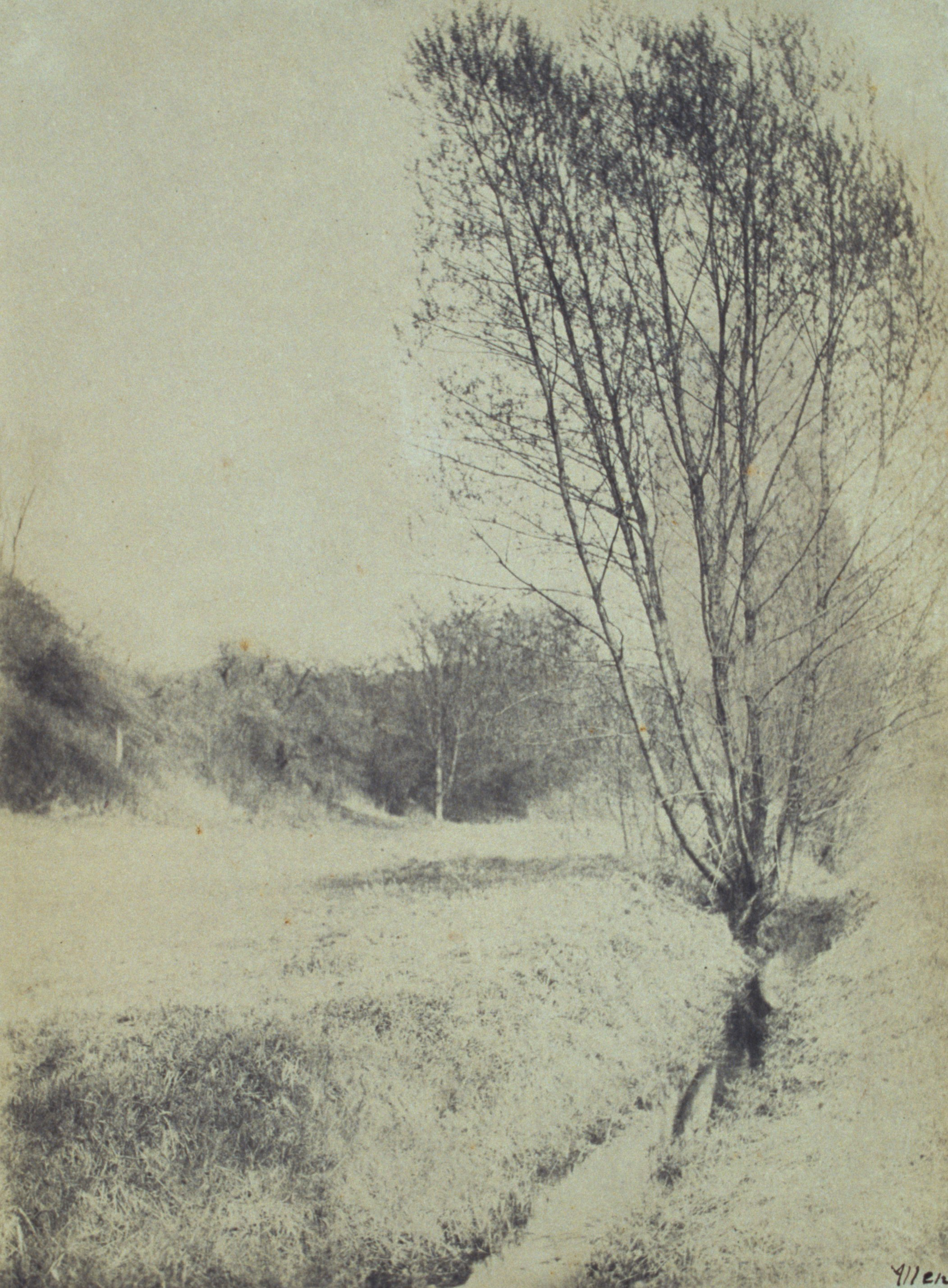
Willows

== Early life and education ==
Allen was one of four children born in Deerfield, Massachusetts, to Josiah Allen, a prosperous farmer, and his wife Mary.

She began studying at the Deerfield Academy with her sister, Frances Stebbins Allen, where they first had the opportunity to progress socially, intellectually, and artistically. In 1874, the sisters joined a two-year program at the State Normal School teacher's college, now known as Westfield State University, in Westfield, Massachusetts. The sisters commenced teaching following completion of their program in 1876, but had to eventually quit in 1886 due to significant hearing loss. The cause of this debility is not known, but it is believed to have been a hereditary problem. Neither of the sisters had experienced any major problems until they were in their late twenties and early thirties. Their hearing was examined by the Massachusetts Eye and Ear Infirmary in 1893; while Frances's ailment was declared incurable, Mary underwent an unsuccessful ear surgery.

== Photography and career ==
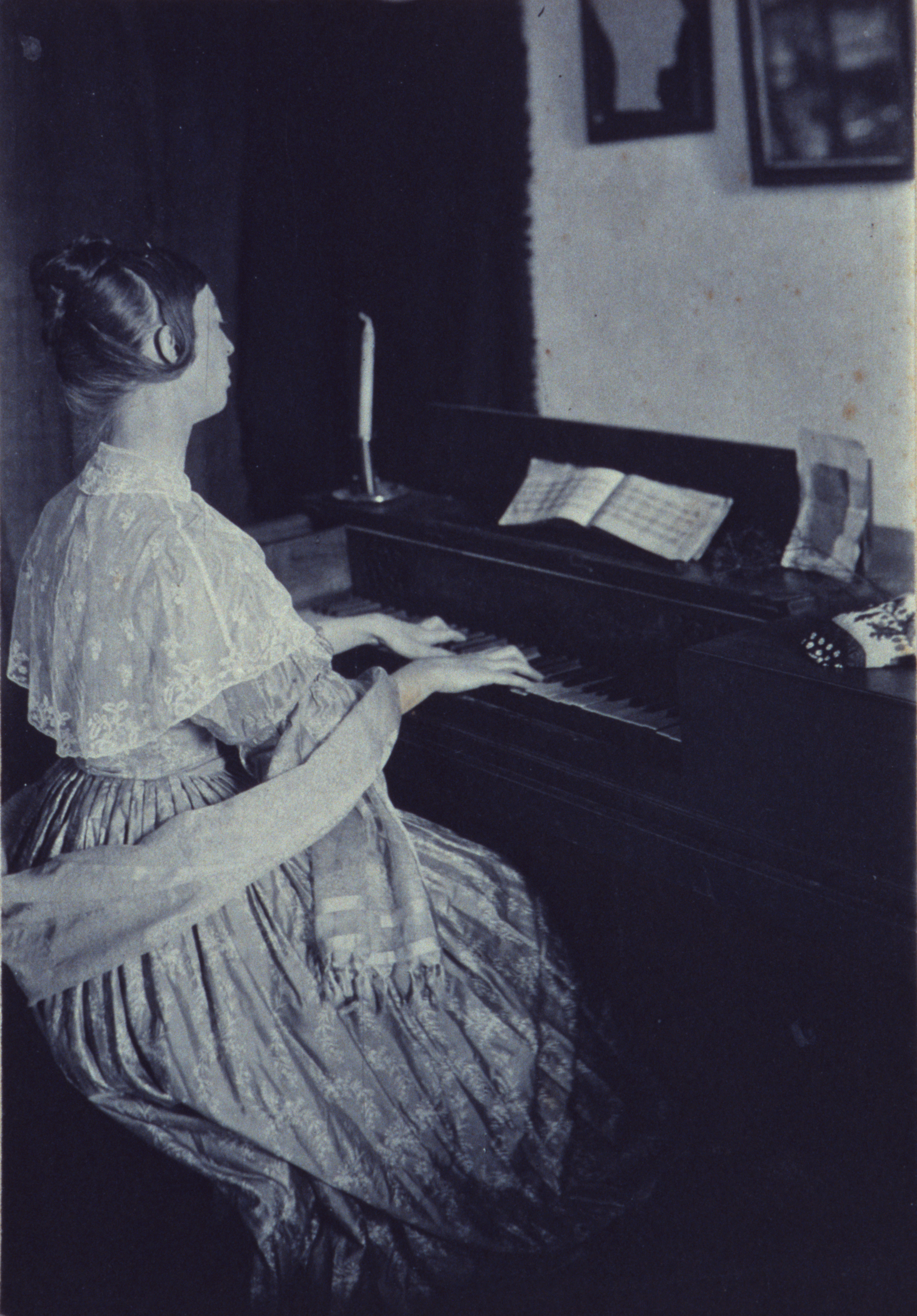
At the spinet

Mary and Frances Allen were first introduced to photography by their brother, Edmund Allen. He was a civil engineer who had to take photographs for his job. They began photographing the life around them in mid-1880s as they were leaving the teaching profession. Their early photographs include cover their family, neighbors and the surrounding fields, farms, and houses in Deerfield. The first record of their photographs can be found from 1884, while they were working as teachers. At this point, they were using a view camera to produce albumen prints.

They gained considerable recognition in 1900 when their photography was featured in the Universal Exposition in Paris. In 1901, they gained popularity when they were called two of 'the Foremost Women Photographers in America' by a famous photographer and critic, Frances Benjamin Johnston, in the Ladies Home Journal's July issue.

Using this newfound popularity as a stepping stone, Mary and Frances converted their home in to a working photography studio in 1901. The darkroom was set up in the upstairs bedroom and the parlor below served as a salesroom. From this home-built studio, they published and sold their catalogs of photography from 1904 until 1920, when Frances lost her eyesight. Mary continued working and living with her sister. Even though they stopped taking new photographs in 1920 when they published their last catalog, they continued to sell the prints until 1935.

Mary often categorized their work as 'art' and 'craft'. She called it 'art' because their photographs were a form of their creative expression. They continually captured the world they lived in as they saw it using their unique and inspired techniques to show it to the world. She called it 'craft' because they were frequently commissioned for portrait photography and to provide illustrations for various subjects in magazine articles. Their photographs included four primary themes:

1. The life of children
2. Natural scenery
3. The Deerfield Arts and Crafts movement
4. Models of colonial life

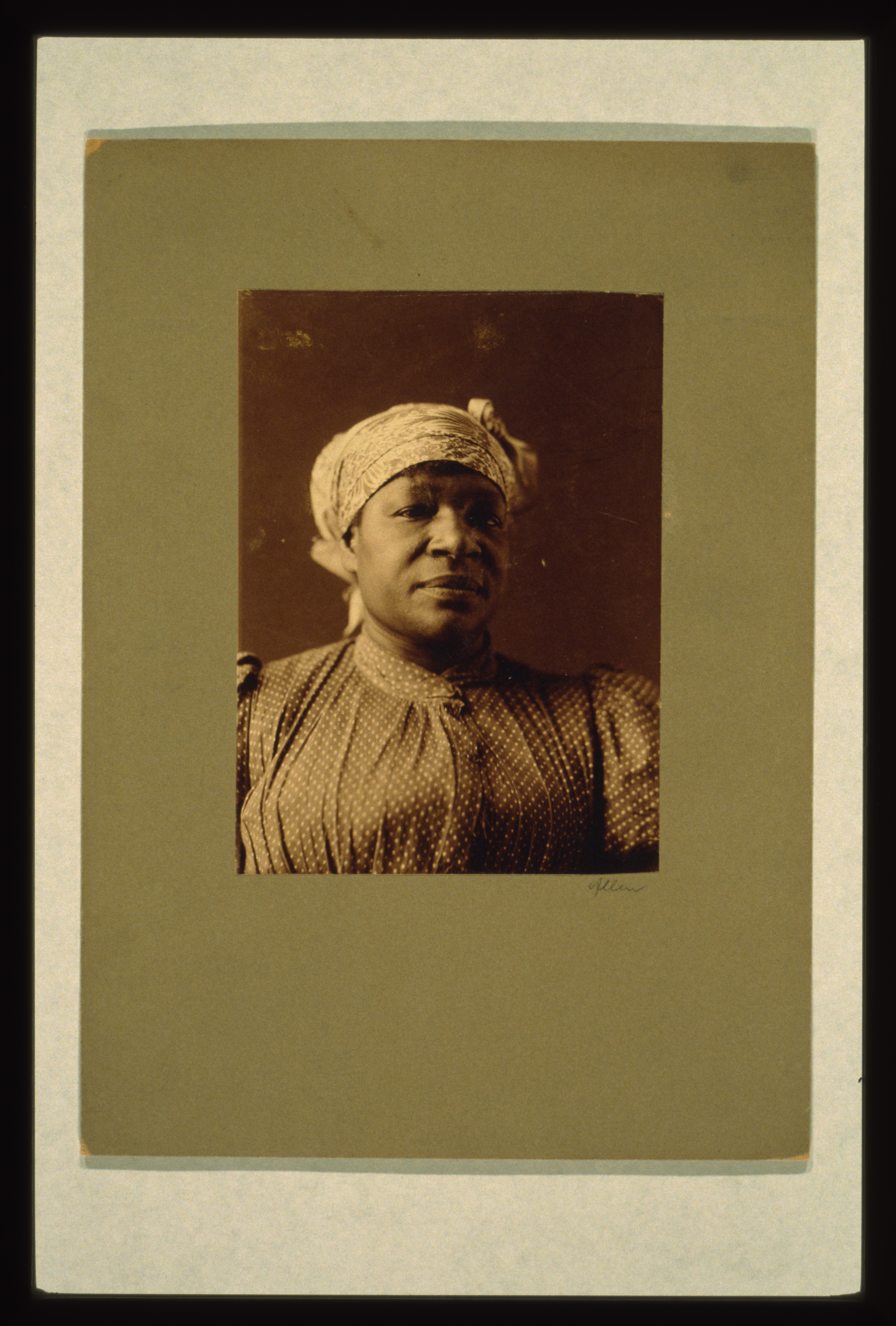
Our Margaret

The photographs taken by the sisters was a reflection of their interest in the town's colonial history. In 'Blue and White Needlework', The House Beautiful, volume III, April 1898, Mary wrote:

"Deerfield, Massachusetts, has long been known to the student of history as an interesting link between the past and the present. Belonging to both periods, and to neither entirely, the transition from old to new can be traced almost continuously. The latest development, the Deerfield Society of Blue-and-White Needlework, is a curious example of this continuity."

They never made substantial money through selling prints and catalogs; however, they still managed to travel to Britain in 1908, and the Grand Canyon and Yosemite in 1916. Mary even had the opportunity to be present for President William McKinley's second inauguration in 1901 at the United States Capitol in Washington D.C.

The sisters were often collectively referred to as 'the Misses Allen'.

=== Involvement with the Deerfield Arts and Crafts movement ===
The Arts and Crafts movement began in England in the wake of industrialization in the 19th century through the efforts of A. W. N. Pugin (architect and designer), John Ruskin (theorist and art critic), William Morris (textile designer, writer, and social activist), and their fellow associates. Their ideas eventually influenced the American arts and crafts community with the movement taking roots in different cities and towns. In June 1987, a Society of Arts and Crafts was formed in Boston. This was followed by the formation of other societies in Chicago, Minneapolis, New York City, Deerfield, among others.

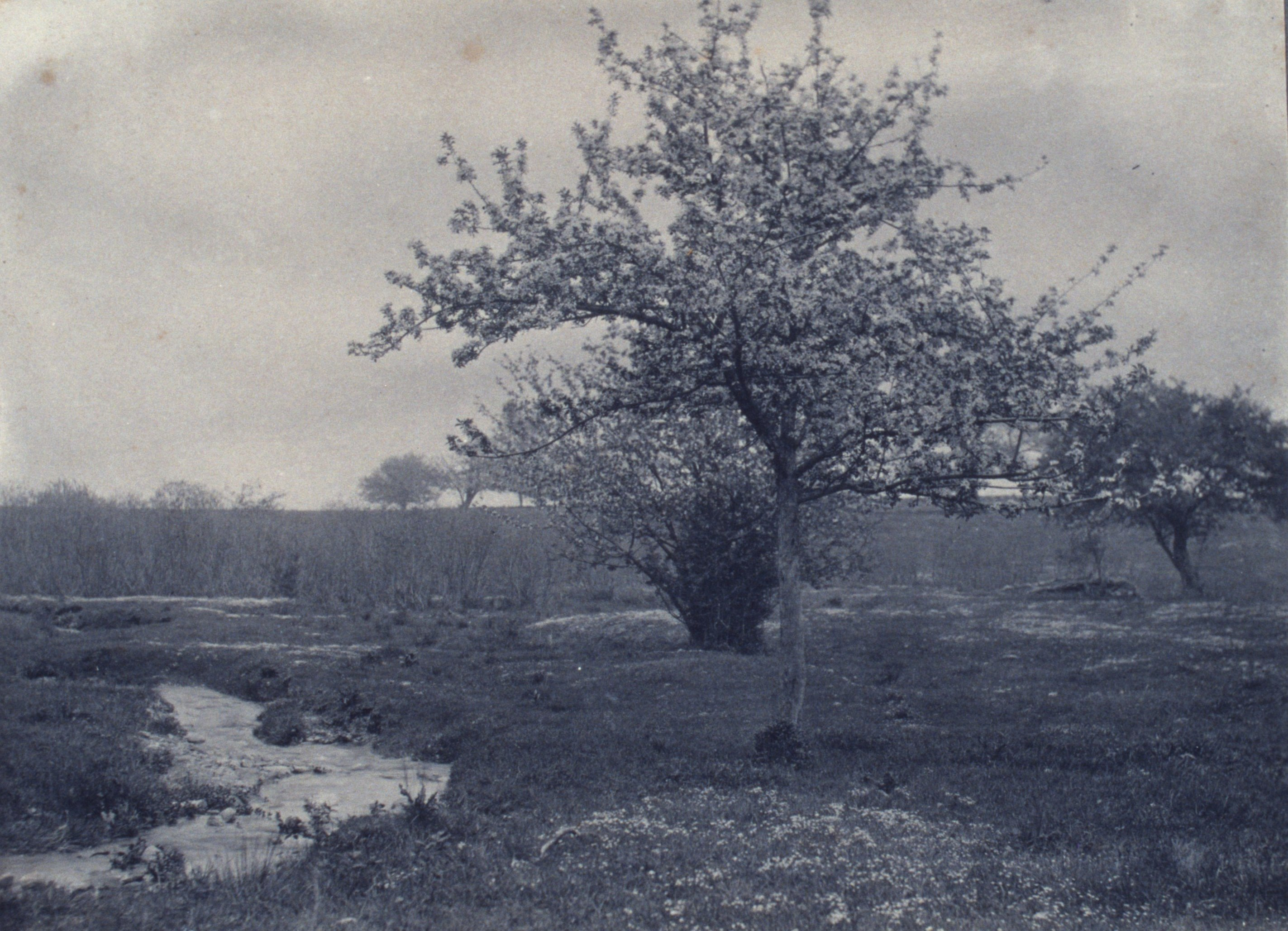
In May

While both the Allen sisters were actively involved with the Deerfield Arts and Crafts movement, Mary played a critical role in its development and progress in their small rural town. They both photographed the happenings related to the movement, including people working at their arts and crafts, and cataloging the pieces their townspeople produced.

Mary abandoned photography for some time to co-found with three other people the Deerfield Society of Blue and White Needlework, an organization dedicated to producing embroidered textiles. In 1896, she designed the organization's trademark seal, the letter 'D' placed over a flax wheel, which was embroidered on all the items put up for sale.

She was also involved with the Society of Deerfield Industries, working as its treasurer between 1901 and 1919, and serving as a member of the executive committee until 1923. Mary actively promoted the Deerfield Arts and Crafts movement by writing articles about it or illustrating articles written by others using the pictures captured by both sisters.

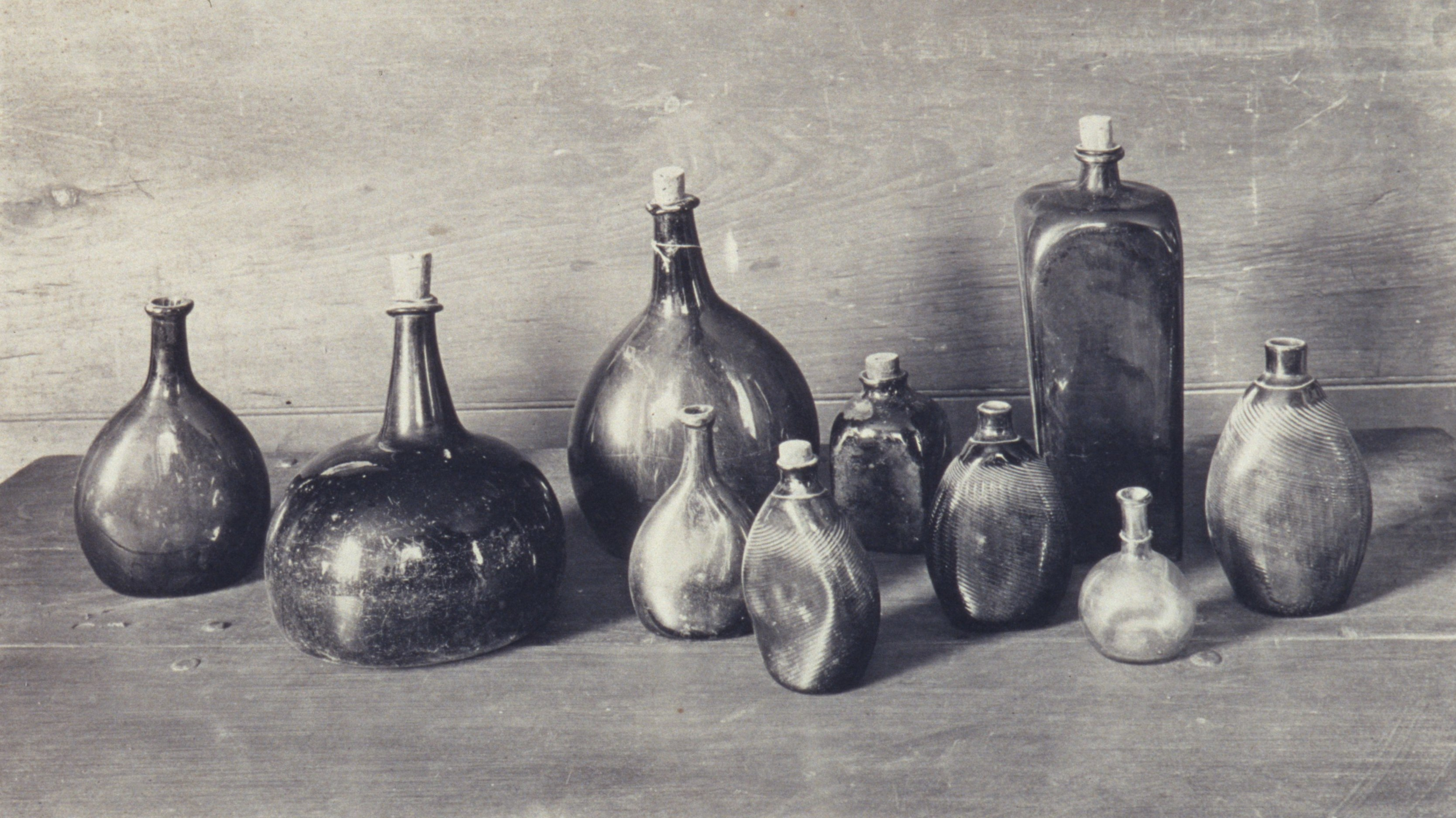
Colonial glassware

In September 1892, an article written by Mary was published in the New England Magazine. The article titled 'Old Deerfield' was pivotal in placing the rural historic town on the tourist map. The flow of tourists and the rising popularity of the Misses Allen helped them sell their photo prints and provided an opportunity to other residents to sell their craft.

== Post-work years and death ==
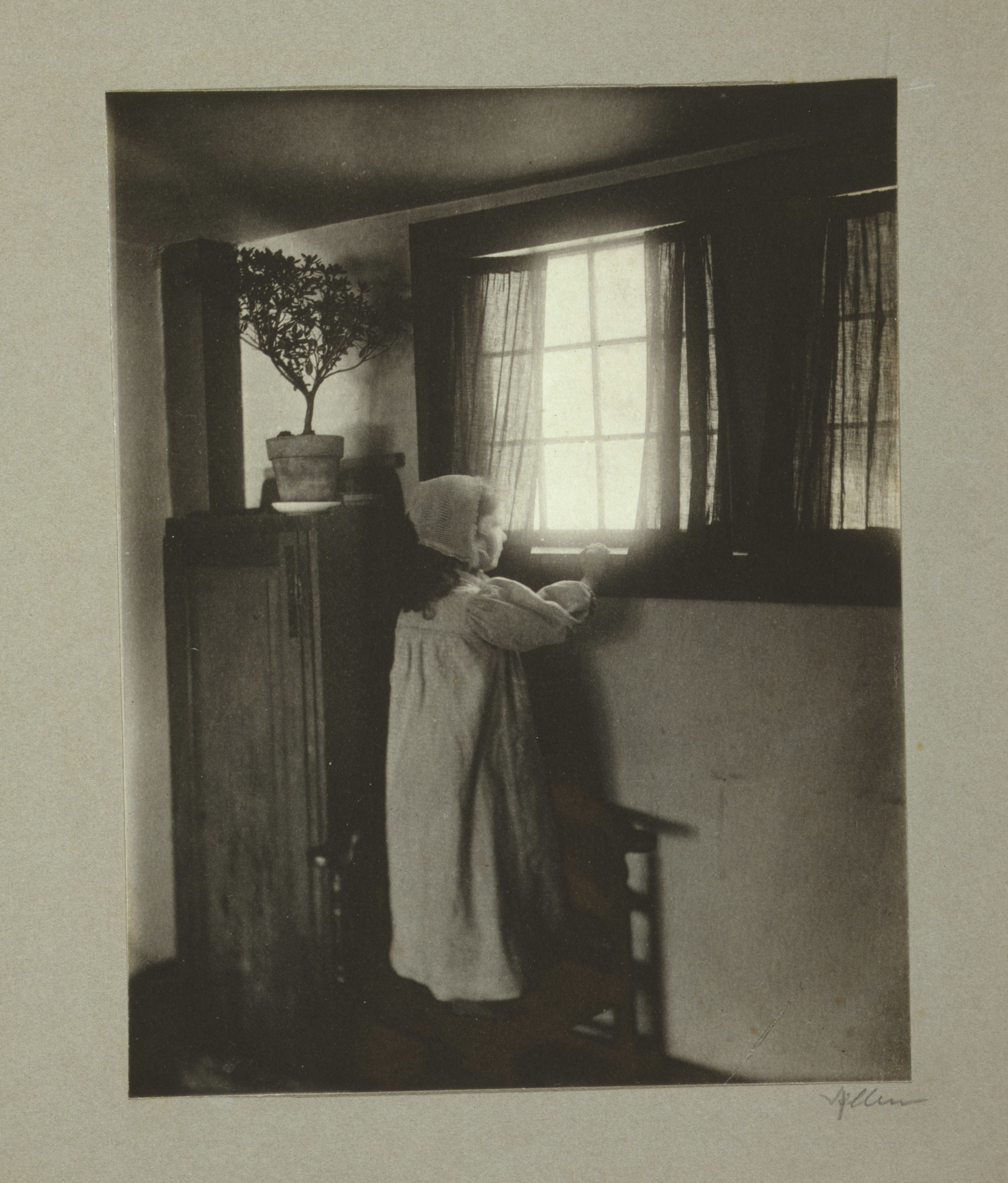
Good morning!

Mary continued working throughout the 1920s; however, Frances began to lose her vision over the decade. They lived in their house and carried on working with the local community of artists and craftspeople until their demise. Frances Stebbins Allen died on February 14, 1941, and Mary Electa Allen died four days after her sister's death on February 18, 1941.

== Photography on display ==
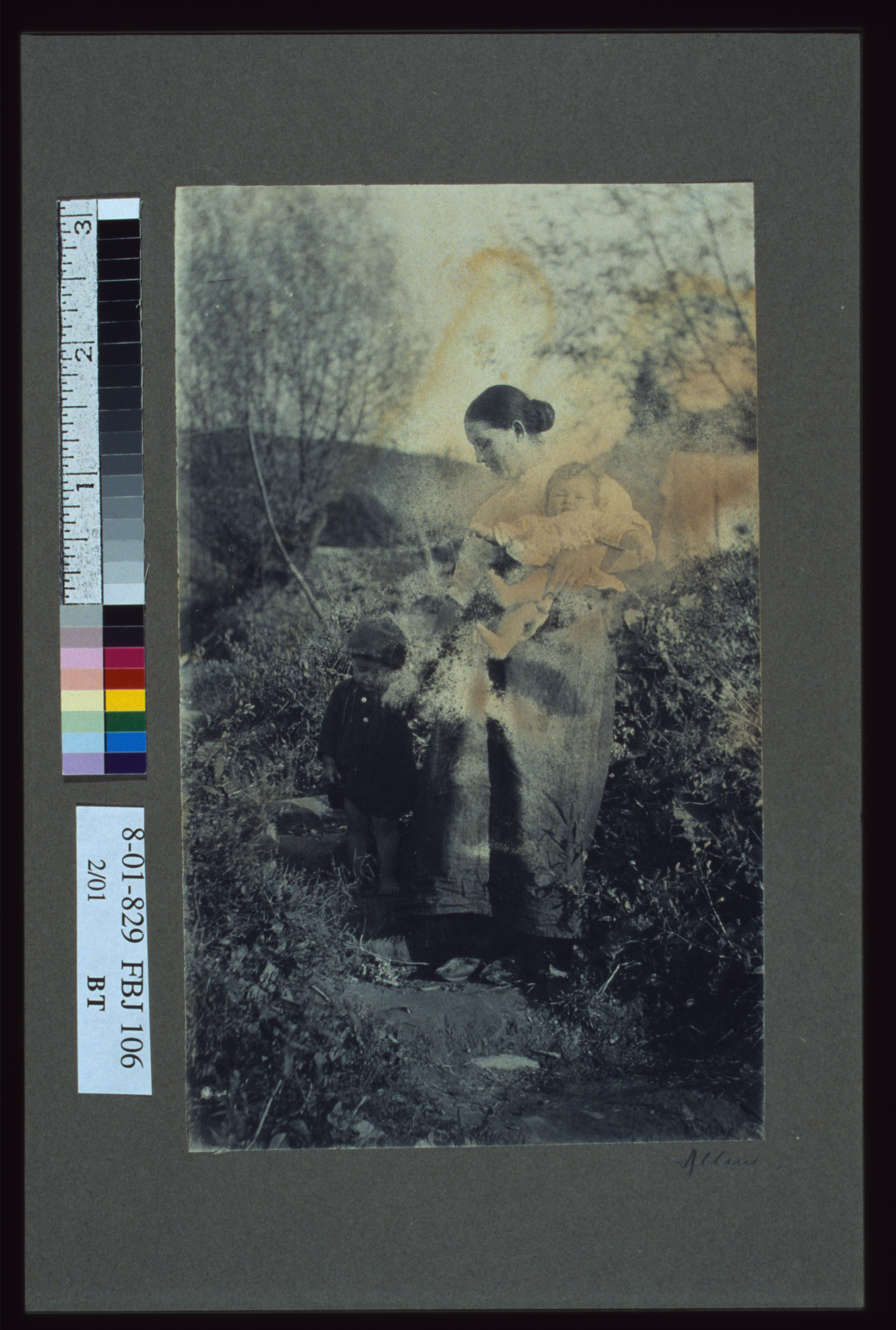
The difficult step

The Misses Allen published seven catalogs of photographs between 1904 and 1920. Their glass plate negatives were inherited by a relative who kept them in a back porch resulting in significant damage. In the 1960s, the Pocumtuck Valley Memorial Association received a number of such negatives from a relative, Margaret Harris Allen. These were sorted and archived by Margaret in the 1970s and transferred to the Memorial Hall Museum in 1996. The 2,300 Allen images were stored at the museum and put on display when 'The Allen Sisters: Pictorial Photographers 1885–1920' was set up. The photographs were cataloged and preserved by Mary Hawks, from the original Deerfield lineage, and Judy Lawrence, Margaret's daughter.
