= Memorial Hall Museum =

Museum in Deerfield, Massachusetts

Memorial Hall Museum is a museum dedicated to preserving the history, art, and culture of the Deerfield, Massachusetts region as well as New England generally. Overseen by the Pocumtuck Valley Memorial Association (PVMA), it opened in 1880.

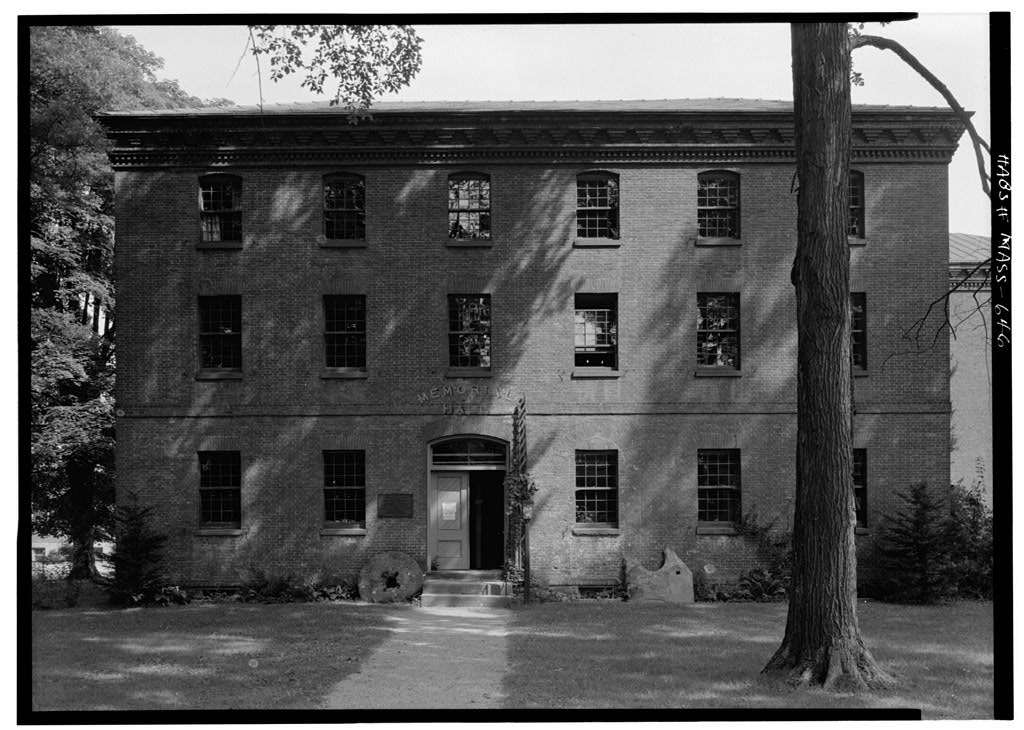
First Deerfield Academy Building

== Antecedents ==
The building that is now Memorial Hall was the first home of Deerfield Academy, built in 1798 and designed by architect Asher Benjamin. It remained a school until 1878. The building was designed to contain a museum, making it one of the oldest museums in the United States. In the original collection were geological specimens and "curiosities" that assisted in educating pupils, and it also had memorabilia donated by the descendants of the Reverend John Williams, who had been taken captive to Canada following the 1704 Raid on Deerfield.

== Founding ==
In 1870, George Sheldon, a preservationist and antiquarian who was interested in historic preservation as early as 1848, founded the Pocumtuck Valley Memorial Association (PVMA) and served as its first president. He located and preserved historical papers, books, and artifacts. After Deerfield Academy moved to a new building in 1878, the Pocumtuck Valley Memorial Association took over Memorial Hall and enhanced its collection with items collected by George Sheldon. Three rooms represented life in Colonial America as perceived in the late nineteenth century, and this was the first US museum to create a permanent period room. The museum opened to the public in 1880, and the building has been expanded several times. (While in close proximity to the buildings of Historic Deerfield, Memorial Hall Museum is a separate institution.)

== Collection ==
The museum focuses on the history, art, and culture of Deerfield, the Deerfield River Valley, the Connecticut River Valley, and New England more widely, from the ancient past to the present. Its collection includes domestic furnishings, paintings, photographs, quilts, other textiles, as well as musical instruments, tools, and Native American artifacts. Many examples of works from the Arts and Crafts Movement are exhibited. Library and archival holdings number more than 25,000 manuscripts, books, maps, and ephemera. In the museum is the Indian House Door, a remnant of the French and Native American Raid on Deerfield. An old inscription next to the door describes how the “stout door kept at bay the French and Indians,” and its “hatchet hewn face still tells the tale of that fateful night.” A replica of the Indian House, also in Deerfield, is another property owned by the Pocumtuck Valley Memorial Association and is open to the public.
