= Robert Crannell Minor =

American artist (1839–1904)

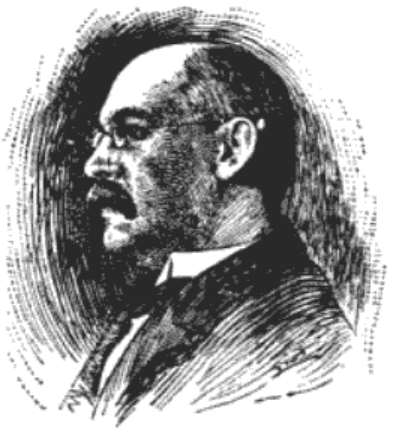
- Born: April 30, 1839; New York City
- Died: August 4, 1904 (aged 65); Waterford, Connecticut
- Education: in Barbizon under Diaz and in Antwerp under Joseph Van Luppen
- Movement: American Barbizon, Tonalist
- Spouse: Isabel A. Minor

Robert Crannell Minor (1839–1904), American artist, was born in New York City on April 30, 1839. His father, Israel Minor, was a merchant who made a large fortune in the pharmaceutical business. As a young man, Robert Minor worked as a bookkeeper in New York City but decided to study art in his early thirties. After studying in New York with painter Alfred Cornelius Howland, Minor went abroad in 1871 to continue his artistic education. He visited various galleries in England before traveling to Barbizon, France, where he studied under Diaz. He later studied in Antwerp under Joseph Van Luppen and Hippolyte Boulenger. In 1874, he was vice president of the Société artistique et littéraire of Antwerp.

On his return to the United States in 1874, he opened a studio in New York. He painted for many years out of his studio in the Old University Building of New York University. Painting in the Adirondack Mountains and later in Waterford, Connecticut, Minor soon became known for his landscapes resembling the Barbizon School. Under the influence of George Inness and Alexander Helwig Wyant, he also began to paint in a Tonalist style. His painting Great Silas at Night (1897) displays his adoption of the Tonalist style while his lingering Barbizon style can be seen in A Hillside Pasture. From the 1890s until his death, Minor exhibited frequently with the Tonalists in New York. In 1897, he was elected a member of the National Academy of Design, New York. In 1900, Minor achieved the height of his success at the historic William T. Evans sale in 1900, where his painting The Close of Day (private collection) fetched $3,050, the highest price for a landscape by a living American painter at that auction.

Over the course of his lifetime, Minor was a member of the Society of American Artists and the Salmagundi Club. He exhibited in New York, Brooklyn, Chicago, and elsewhere in the United States, as well as in the Royal Academy of London and the salons of Paris and Antwerp. Minor was plagued with bad health during the last decade of his life. Despite later speculation, it did not materially impact the quantity of his output, and the suggestion that it impacted the quality of his work is a misreading of the increasing abstraction in certain of his later Tonalist paintings. He died at his home in Waterford, Connecticut, on August 4, 1904. His paintings are owned by the Smithsonian American Art Museum, the Yale University Art Gallery, the Mead Art Museum, the Lyman Allyn Museum, the Florence Griswold Museum, the Brooklyn Museum, the Newark Museum, the Robert Hull Fleming Museum, the Haggin Museum, the Salmagundi Club, the Memorial Art Gallery, and the University of Arizona Museum of Art.

== Work ==
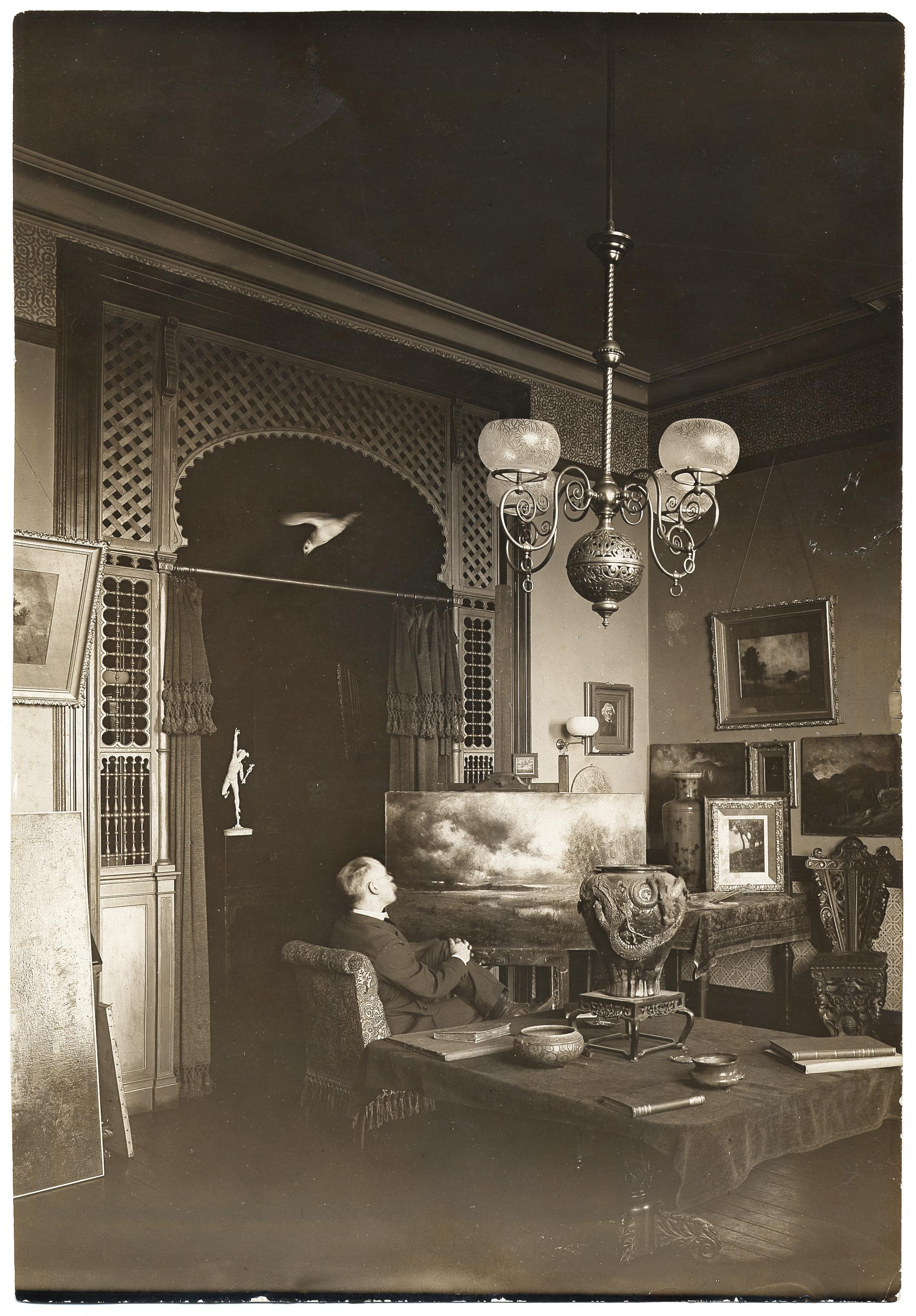
Crannell Minor c. 1900

His paintings are characteristic of the Barbizon school and Tonalism, and he was particularly happy in his sunset and twilight effects; but it was only within a few years of his death that he began to have a vogue among collectors. Among his works are:

- Silent Lake (1872 - Paris Salon - an oil painting) see https://www.invaluable.com/auction-lot/robert-crannell-minor-american-1839-1904-122-c-78b41edbfb
- Autumn (1874)
- Evening (1875)
- Daybreak" aka "Dawn (1876)
- Under the Oaks (1878)
- Studio of Corot (1878)
- Sundown (1879)
- The Stream (1879)
- Autumn on Lake Champlain (1879)
- October Days (1880)
- Eventide (1881)
- The Vale of Kennett (1882)
- Edge of the Wood (1882)
- Interior of the Forest (1883)
- Morning in June (1883)
- The Wold of Kent, England (1884)
- The Cradle of the Hudson (1885)
- The Close of Day (1886)
- Indian Summer on the Ausable (1888)
- Moonlight on the Sound (1891)
- The Evening Star (1893)
- A Woodland Path aka A Pathway through the Woods (1895)
- A Summer Day (1896)
- Midnight aka Moonlight (1897)
- Great Silas at Night (1897)
- Cloudy October aka Cloudy Autumn (1897)
- Sunset (1897)
- September by the Sea (1898)
- Near New London (1900)
- Nocturne (1904)
