= Elisha Yale =

Reverend from New York (1780-1853)

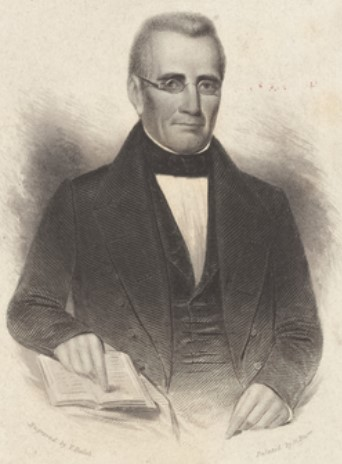
Reverend Elisha Yale

Reverend Elisha Yale (1780 – 1853) was an American clergyman and pastor, first minister of the Congregational church of Gloversville, New York. He founded the Kingsborough Academy, now the Fulton County Historical Society and Museum, and published several works on religion.

== Biography ==
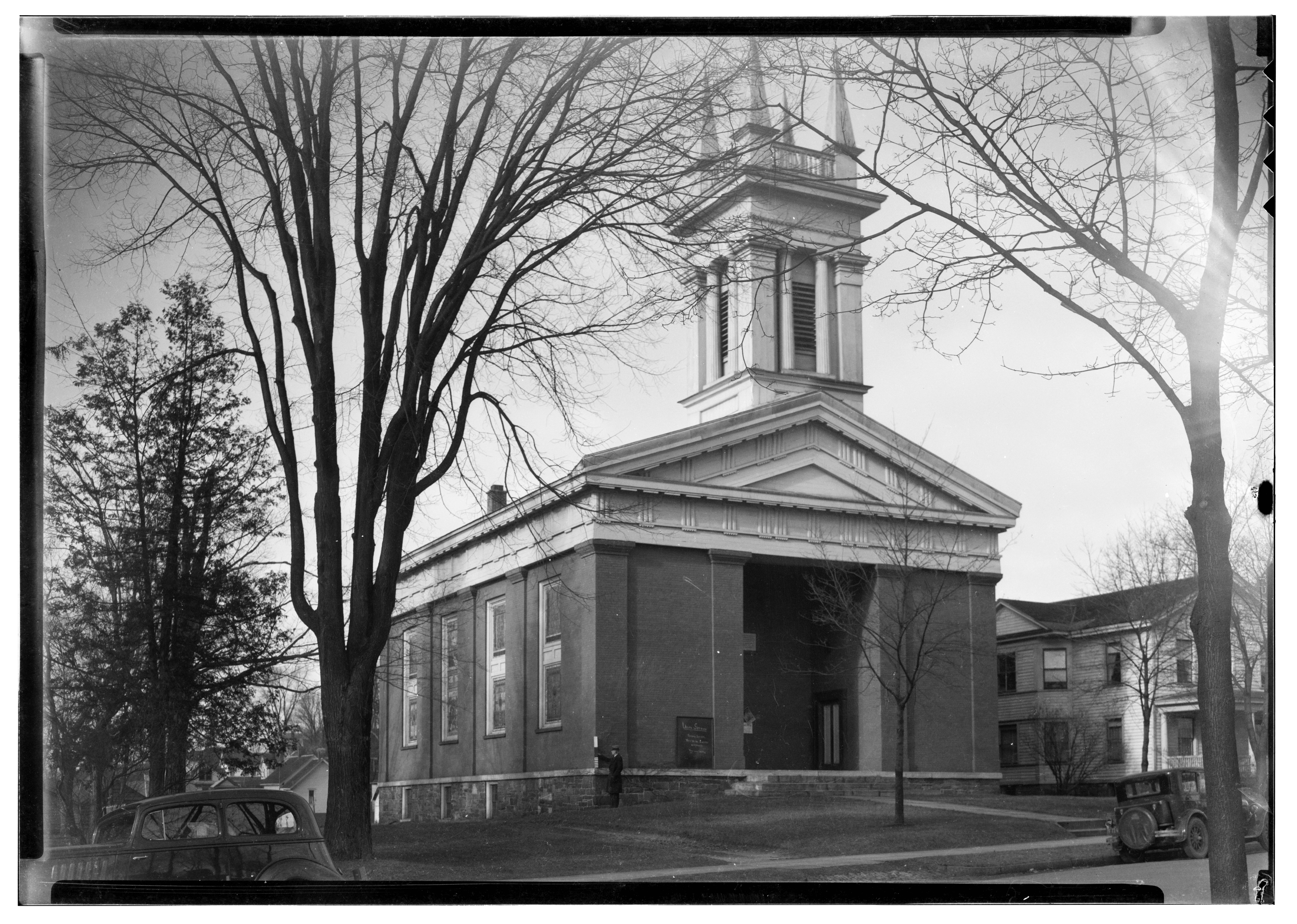
Kingsboro Presbyterian Church, North Kingsboro Avenue, Gloversville, Fulton County, NY

Elisha Yale was born in Lee, Massachusetts, June 15, 1780, to Justus Yale of the Yale family, and Margaret Tracy, a descendant of Lieutenant Thomas Tracy of Norwich, Connecticut. His uncle was Captain Josiah Yale, a representative in the city's legislature, a selectman, and a member of the Congregational church. He was recruited in the American War of Independence and was promoted to the rank of captain.

Yale was the brother of Rev. Calvin Yale of Martinsburg, New York, who married Eliza Robbins, a granddaughter of Mayor Peter Curtis, who was involved with the battles of Lexington and Bunker Hill during the American Revolutionary War. His brother was also a graduate from Union College, pastor of the Congregational and Presbyterian church, and the principal of two academies.

Yale relocated as child from Lee, Massachusetts to Lenox in the same state. From 1798 to 1799, he taught in the schools of Richmond and Lenox, and in 1800, left home to pursue studies until 1803 with Rev. Dr. Perkins of West Hartford, Connecticut, grandson of Deacon Joseph Perkins. He was then licensed to preach the gospel by the North Association of Hartford County, and in the same year, arrived at Kingsboro, New York, then a part of Johnstown.

In 1829, he received the degree of Doctor of Sacred Theology from Yale College, cofounded by his family in 1701. The coat of arms of Yale College are those of a branch of his family, the Yales of Plas Grono, family of Chancellor David Yale, father of Thomas Yale. Rev. Yale was a personal tutor of Hiram Bingham I, who later introduced Christianity to the Hawaiian islands. Another student was Rev. Edward Lounsbery of the Trinity Episcopal Cathedral, one of the oldest in the country.

He would preach in Kingsboro for about 56 years and was the first pastor of the Congregetional church there until 1852. Under his ministry, large additions were made to the church. He was a man of much prominence in the Congregational and Presbyterian Churches of New England and New York, and became also a trustee of Union College.

He was a corporate member of the American Board of Commissioners for Foreign Missions and a board director of the boards of the American Bible Society and American Tract Society. Yale was the first itinerant minister in the southern Adirondack Trail, and founded Kingsborough Academy, which originally trained pastors and missionaries, but now houses the Fulton County Historical Society and Museum. Though he was pastor of a Congreational church, he was a Presbyterian, and member of the Presbytery of Albany.

== Family ==
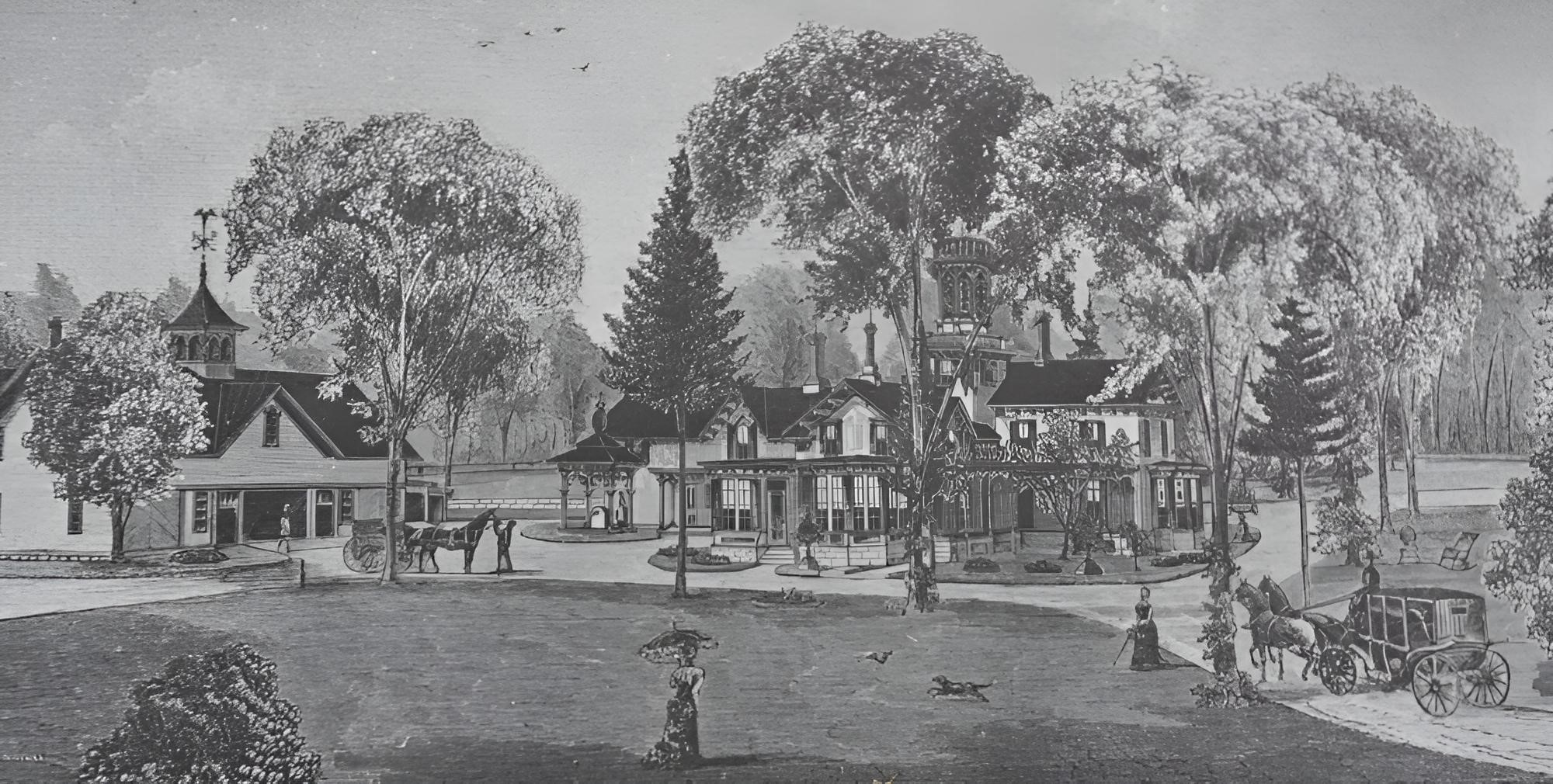
Senator Elizur Smith's residence, High Lawn Stock Farm, built in 1850 in Lee and Lenox, Massachusetts

Rev. Yale's cousins were Rev. Cyrus Yale, a minister and pastor from Williams College, abolitionist Barnabas Yale, Rev. Charles Yale of Lenox, Massachusetts, Lucy Tracy Yale, wife of a wealthy manufacturer of axes in Canada, and Eunice Yale, great-grandmother of Chief economist Edward Dana Durand, teacher in economics at Harvard and Stanford. A more distant cousin was Dr. Leroy Milton Yale Jr., cofounder of the New York Etching Club.

Yale was the granduncle of Wellington Smith, one of the largest paper manufacturers in the country, nephew of Senator Elizur Smith. Wellington's son, Elizur Yale Smith, would marry the daughter of Col. Clermont Livingston Best, Annie Livingston Tooker Best of Mrs. Astor's Four Hundred, who was a relative of Gabriel Mead Tooker and Charlotte Tooker Warren, of the Goelet and Vanderbilt families.

They sold land and an estate to William Douglas Sloane and Emily Thorn Vanderbilt, on which they built "Elm Court", and to George Westinghouse, rival of Thomas Edison and builder of "Erskine Park" on the estate. His grandniece, Mary Yale Pitkin, married to landscape architect Charles Eliot of the Eliot Family, son of Charles William Eliot, President of Harvard. His grandnephew was Yale martyr Horace Tracy Pitkin, family member of New York Senator Mortimer Yale Ferris.

== Legacy ==
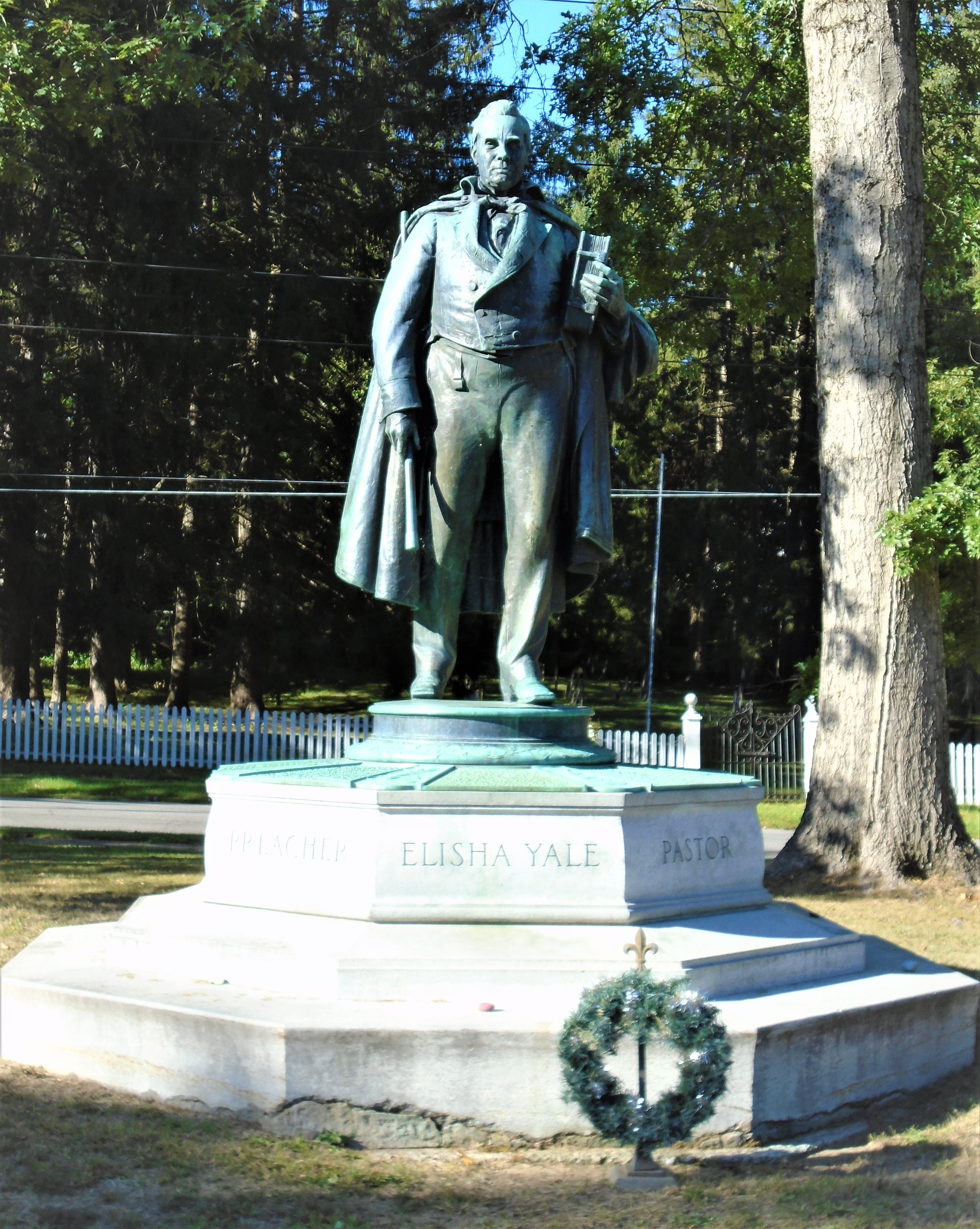
Statue of Rev. Elisha Yale in Gloversville, NY

Throughout his life, Rev. Yale wrote several religious books and periodicals. In 1853, he published "A Select Verse System" for the use of individuals and the schools of Rochester, "A Review of a Pastorate of Forty Eight Years" and "Helps to Cultivate the Conscience", among others.

Yale married September 7, 1804, to Tirza Northrup.

On March 27, 1849, he adopted Elisha Yale West, son of Charles H. West. They had previously adopted Charles, who was a son of Elizabeth Tracy-West. The couple had no children of their own.

He died on January 9, 1853, at Kingsboro, New York.

The Presbyterian Historical Society, the oldest continuous denominational historical society in the United States, has a collection of about 30 manuscripts and items on Rev. Elisha Yale.

His name was commemorated on the historical Church on the Hill, at Lenox, Massachusetts along with Thomas Yale of New Haven, and others.

A large statue of him by sculptor Henry Augustus Lukeman was erected in Gloversville, Kingsboro Historic District, New York. The statue's unveiling was done by Dr. Reid, pastor of the Fremont Street Methodist Church, and General Richard Montgomery Chapter, of the Sons of the American Revolution.

Yale's memoirs were published by Rev. Jeremiah Wood in 1854 named The Model Pastor: the Life and Character of the Rev. Elisha Yale, D. D..
