= Josiah Yale =

Captain and pioneer of Lee, Massachusetts

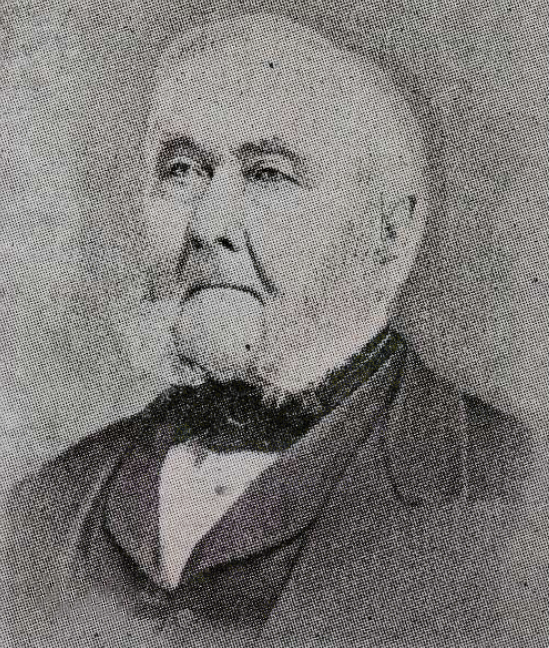
Portrait of Capt. Josiah Yale's son, Josiah Yale Jr.

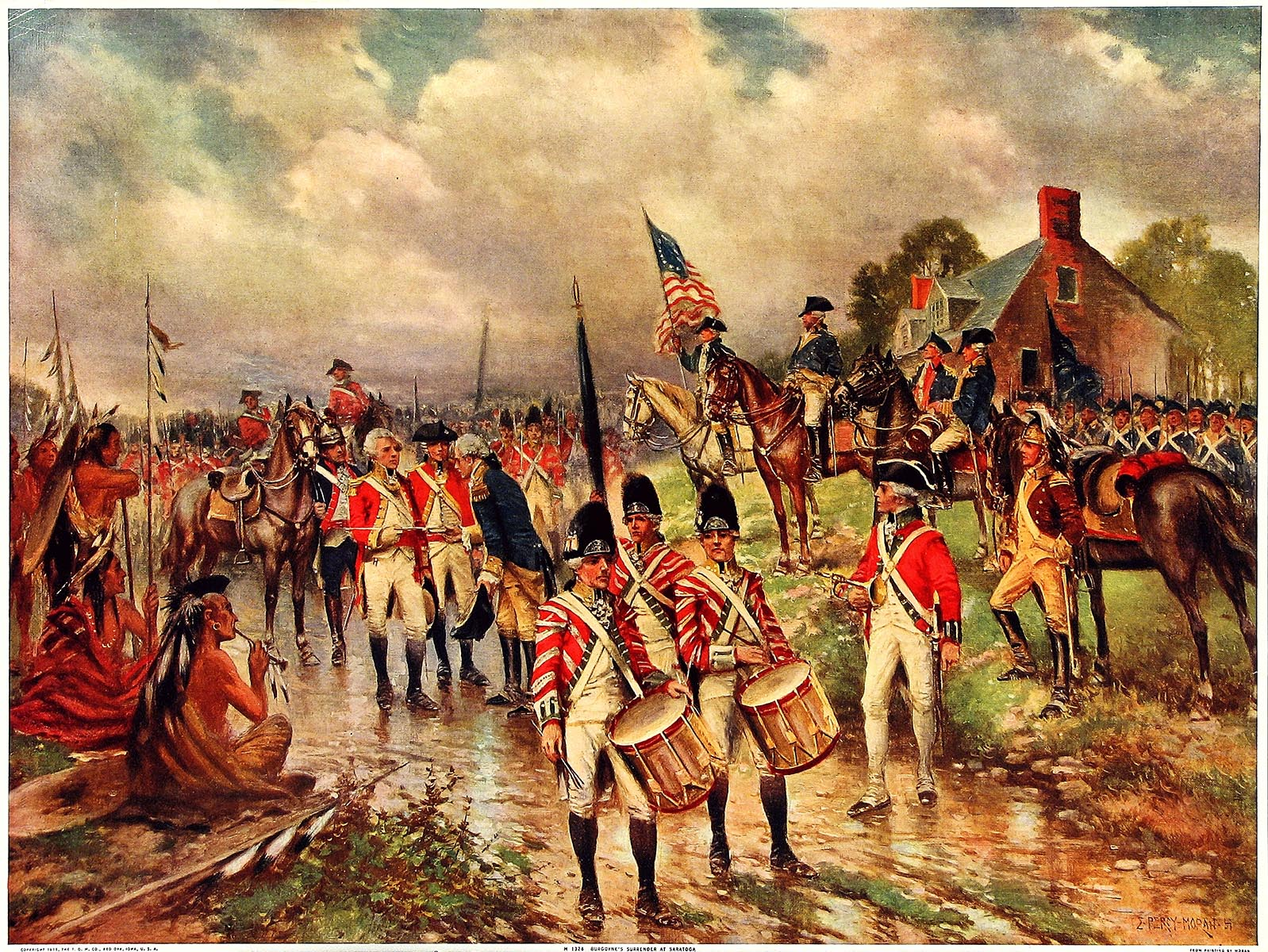
British General John Burgoyne's surrender, during the Saratoga Campaign

Captain Josiah Yale (1752 – 1822) was a politician and military officer from Massachusetts. He became an early settler and pioneer of Lee, Massachusetts, and was made Justice of the Peace and Minister Treasurer. He also fought in the Stillwater Alarms of the Saratoga Campaign during the American War of Independence, and was a deputy in the Massachusetts House of Representatives, serving under Gov. James Sullivan and Lt. Gov. Levi Lincoln Sr.

== Biography ==
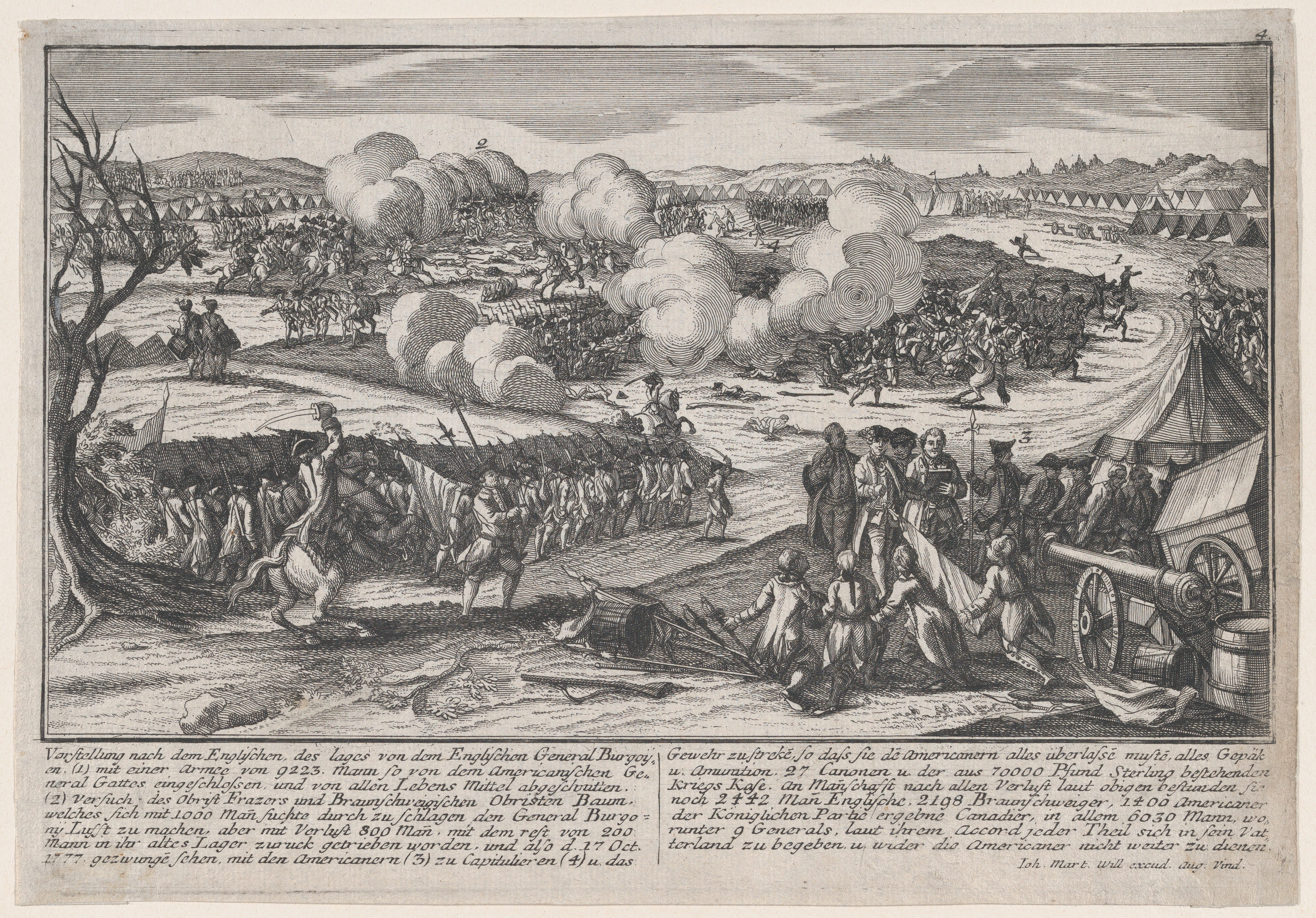
Battle of Saratoga at Stillwater, New York, where Capt. Yale was engaged under General Rossiter during the Saratoga Campaign

Josiah Yale was born in Wallingford, Connecticut, on June 19, 1752, to John Yale and Eunice Andrews, members of the Yale family. His father John was the grandson of Capt. Thomas Yale Jr., cofounder of Wallingford, and the great-grandson of Capt. Thomas Yale Sr., cofounder of New Haven Colony. Josiah was the grandnephew of Capt. Theophilus Yale, a cousin of Capt. Elihu Yale, and a distant cousin of Lt. Gov. William H. Yale.

In 1774, Yale bought 50 acres of land from William Andrus of Lenox in the northwest part of Lee, which became part of the estate of Senator Elizur Smith, uncle of paper manufacturer Wellington Smith, Yale's great-grandson. Capt. Yale married to Ruth Tracy on December 26, 1774, in Lee, Massachusetts, one year before the incorporation of the town, and were the first couple recorded in its history. Yale was among the early settlers and pioneers of Lee, Massachusetts, along with Cornelius Bassett, Jesse Gifford, William Ingersoll, Samuel Stanley, and others.

The Battle of Lexington, the first military campaign of the American War of Independence, was fought about two years and a half before the incorporation of the town. The town raised men for the war, and provided food to the Continental Army and the militia. Regiments included those of Col. John Paterson, later Major General and Congressman, and Col. Benjamin Simonds of Simonds' Regiment of Militia. Some of the town's soldiers were engaged in General John Stark's regiment at the Battle of Bennington, and participated in the campaign that brought the surrender of British General John Burgoyne.

On January 4, 1780, Yale was put in charge, with the selectmen of the city, of the payments of 11 soldiers for 6 months of service. Yale served during the American War of Independence and was promoted to the rank of captain. He would also lead his regiment toward the Stillwater Alarms with the militia companies of Lee and Lenox, Massachusetts. Yale's company during the revolution was part of General David Rosseter's regiment, and saw action at the Stillwater Alarms of the Saratoga Campaign. Rosseter was previously major in Simonds' Regiment of Militia.

== Later career ==
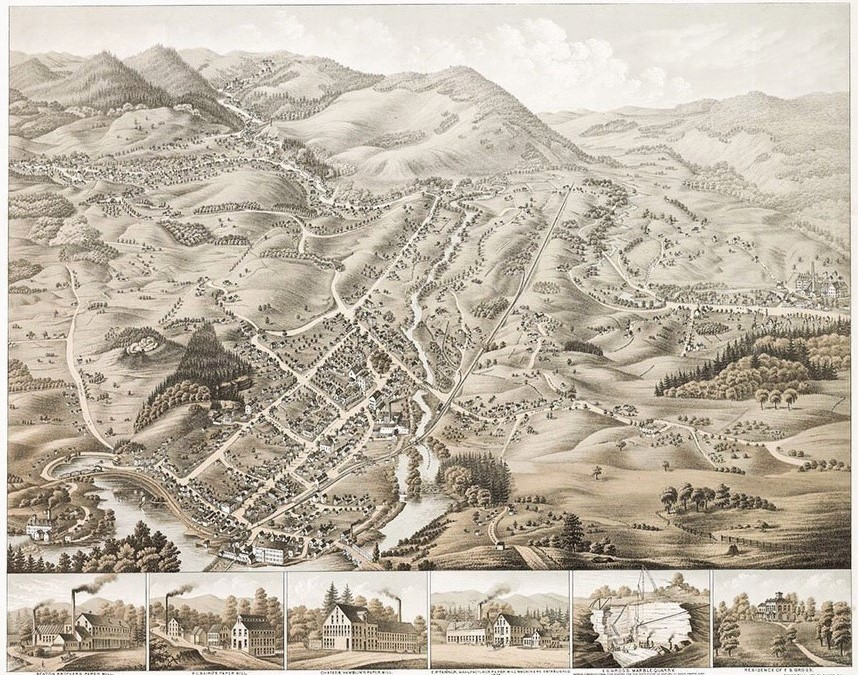
Map of Lee, Massachusetts, during the 19th century

The citizens of Lee came initially from Cape Cod, following the financial troubles they suffered during the American Revolutionary War, and Yale helped with the construction of the town's first meeting-house with iron materials and its iron church bell. His home became the old Yale house in the city. At the time, the town of Lee was not yet incorporated, being a wild wilderness, and needed small farms and log houses to sustain its population. Yale became selectman in 1781, and was involved in fixing the town's bridge and high ways.

Yale became one of the town surveyors in 1783, and town moderator in 1784 with Capt. Bradley and Lt. Wells. In the same year, Yale was made town treasurer, and in 1785, collector of taxes. He was selected among the 7 men, with Capt. Porter, to take care of the small pox. In 1785, he was selected as one of the school agents, and became Constable of the city. He was chosen as the town moderator in 1787. In 1792, Yale was selected to represent the town in the Massachusetts General Court, and became Minister Treasurer of the city in 1795, with Colonel Jared Bradley as moderator and Nathan Dillingham as town treasurer.

In 1797, he was on the committee to build a new meeting-house for the city, at a cost of $2,500, and was made one of its superintendent. Yale representend the town in the Massachusetts House of Representatives for numbers of years, but lost, along with Colonel Porter, to Capt. Joseph Whiton in 1799. In 1800, he cofounded and assisted in the construction of the first Congregational Church in the city, and stayed involved in the public sphere for much of his life. Yale was also elected on the building committee.

He served for twenty years on the board of selectmen, and 6 years as a deputy to the Massachusetts House of Representatives, serving under Gov. James Sullivan, and Lt. Gov. Levi Lincoln Sr., and Senate's President Harrison Gray Otis. On June 10, 1819, Yale, with Deacon David Ingersoll and others, organized at a town meeting the creation of the Lee Congregational Sunday-School with Dr. Hyde, and was made a member of its committee. In 1822, he was made Justice of the Peace. Capt. Josiah Yale died in Lee, Massachusetts, on May 13, 1822, at 69 years old.

== Family ==
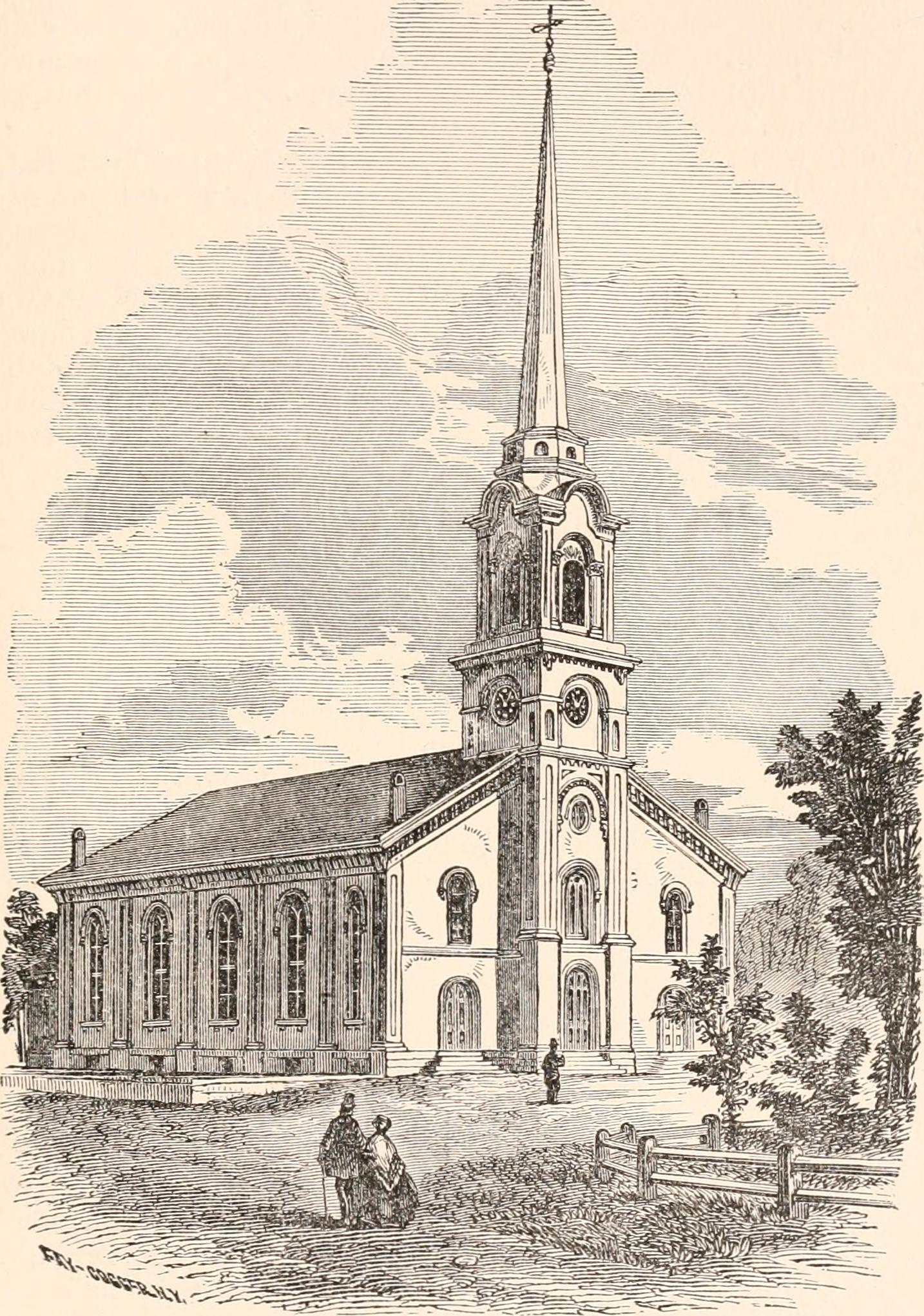
Congregational Church of Lee, Massachusetts, under Dr. Hyde

Yale was the father of Rev. Cyrus Yale, who became the grandfather of Yale martyr Horace Tracy Pitkin, and Mary Yale Pitkin, wife of architect Charles Eliot. Eliot's firm worked on the Biltmore Estate of the Vanderbilts, and was himself the son of the President of Harvard University, Charles William Eliot. His daughter Eunice Yale became the grandmother of Rev. Theodore Yale Gardner, and Cleveland Mayor George W. Gardner, one of the first business partners of John D. Rockefeller.

His son, Josiah Yale Jr., became the grandfather of millionaire Wellington Smith, the largest paper manufacturer in America. Smith was an intimate friend of Abraham Lincoln and President William McKinley, and became the father of socialite Elizur Yale Smith, who married the daughter of Col. Clermont Livingston Best, a member of Mrs. Astor's Four Hundred. Yale's nephew, Rev. Elisha Yale, became a Yale graduate and the first minister of the Congregational church of Gloversville, New York.

Capt. Josiah Yale's cousin, Fanny Alsmena Yale of New York, became the mother of Clarissa Hills, who married to Supreme Court Judge Alanson H. Barnes, Associate Justice of Dakota and namesake of Barnes County. Clarissa was the mother-in-law of Judge Alfred Delavan Thomas, who became the corporate attorney of millionaire George Hearst, father of William Randolph Hearst of Hearst Castle. Hearst's wealth came from the Homestake Mines that he owned in South Dakota at the time.

Yale's sister, Mary Yale, married to Samuel Simpson Sr., and became the stepmother of Samuel Simpson Jr., cofounder of Simpson, Hall, Miller & Co. in Wallingford, Connecticut. Capt. Yale's cousin, Colonel Braddam Yale, became the great-grandfather of May Yale Ogden, who married the grandson of Knight commander Henry James Anderson, and Frances Da Ponte. Da Ponte was the daughter of Venetian artist Lorenzo Da Ponte, who built the first Italian opera house in Manhattan, and became a personal friend and associate of Mozart and Casanova.
