= Barnabas Yale =

Abolitionist lawyer from New York (1784-1854)

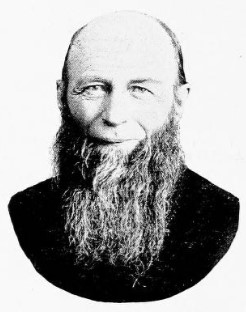
Portrait of Barnabas Yale's nephew, Walter D. Yale, public notary and professor of the Bible for 30 years

Barnabas Yale (1784 – 1854) was an American abolitionist attorney, vice-president and cofounder of the Central New-York Anti-Slavery Society, part of the American Anti-Slavery Society. He petitioned Congress in 1838 for the abolition of slavery, about 30 years before the American Civil War, and was made Justice of the Peace of Martinsburg, New York.

== Early life ==
Barnabas Yale was born in Rupert, Vermont, on April 9, 1784, to Sally Baxter and Amasa Yale, grandnephew of Capt. Theophilus Yale, and member of the Yale family. His father was a soldier in the American War of Independence, surveyor and merchant, and his mother, born in Boston, was from the Baxters involved with the Boston Tea Party. His brother was Paul Baxter Yale, father of Walter D. Yale, public notary and teacher. His brother owned an alcohol business which he ran for a few years, served in the War of 1812, and was also a cattle dealer and bridge builder. He married Achsah, daughter of John Dewey.

Her father was a selectman and a clothing merchant who also enlisted in the War of Independence, and wrote in his journal his travels during the war, including the passing of the Delaware River with General Washington, while Baxter Yale's brother-in-law, Perez Dewey, was the first president and wealthiest merchant in Sinclairville, New York. Barnabas's cousin was Capt. Josiah Yale of the Revolutionary War, father of Eunice Yale, the grandmother of Mayor George W. Gardner, an early business partner of John D. Rockefeller and descendant of the Quincy and Adams families, of U.S. Presidents and Founding Father John Adams and John Quincy Adams.

Barnabas was also a cousin of Rev. Cyrus Yale, Rev. Elisha Yale, Dr. Leroy Milton Yale Jr. from Martha's Vineyard, and tin ware manufacturer Burrage Yale, who played a major role during the Civil War as co-proprietor of Lamson, Goodnow & Yale, the largest gun-machine manufacturer of Abraham Lincoln's army, family of Linus Yale Sr. Barnabas removed to Salem, New York, during his childhood, where his father died, leaving him and his two siblings to the care of their mother. For two years he attended Salem Academy, then entered in the law office of lawyer Blanchard, where he would remain for about two and a half years.

== Career ==
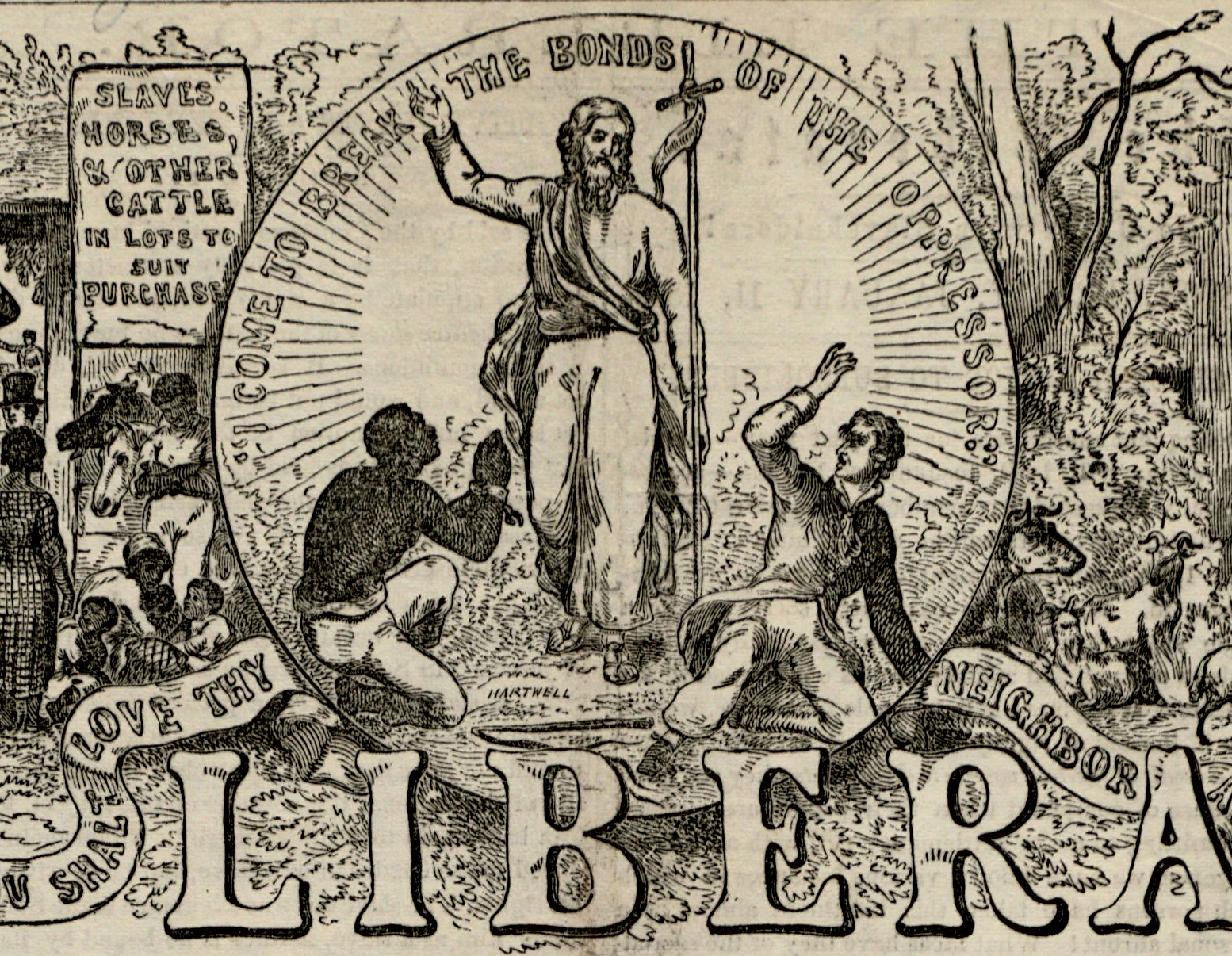
A copy of The Liberator, an abolitionist newspaper in which Barnabas Yale is featured during the Utica convention

In February 1807, Yale began practicing law in Martinsburg, New York, and stayed a member of the Lewis County Bar for 25 years. On May 28, 1812, he became a founding member and first secretary of the Bible Society of Lewis County with Rev. James Murdock as president. In 1818, he became one of the founding trustee of the first Presbyterian society of Martinsburgh, whose church was initially founded in 1806 through the aid of General Walter Martin, of Martin House.

He was appointed Surrogate on June 6, 1820, and as such, was elected for a term of four years, and was allowed to deal with deeds and administer oaths in the same manner as a County judge. In 1836, he moved to St. Lawrence county and then to Potsdam, New York.

For many years, Yale was Justice of the Peace. He was an active member of the Presbyterian church and was among the leaders of the reform movements of his time. He ran as an independent candidate for the office of County Clerk. As an abolitionist lawyer, Barnabas Yale petitioned Congress in 1838 with other citizens of Potsdam, presenting four petitions for the abolition of slavery with Senator Silas Wright, later Governor of New York :

"Mr. Wright presented the petition of Barnabas Yale and others, citizens of Potsdam, St. Lawrence county, New York,... praying the abolition of slavery and the slave trade in the District of Columbia; ... praying the abolition of slavery in those territories of the United States where they exist, ... and praying that no new state may be admitted into the Union, whose constitution tolerates domestic slavery."
- The entry in the Journal of the Senate, 2nd Session, 25th Congress, Washington, March 19, 1838, p. 294

The World Anti-Slavery Convention of 1840 at Exeter Hall in London. William Lloyd Garrison and Arthur Tappan, founders of the American Anti-Slavery Society were participants

Yale cofounded the Central New-York Anti-Slavery Society in 1842, auxiliary to the American Anti-Slavery Society. He was elected a vice-president of this society at its convention, and the event was reported on December 30, 1842, by the abolitionist newspaper The Liberator, property of reformer William Lloyd Garrison.

Many abolitionist leaders of the period were readers of the journal, including Frederick Douglass and the brothers Lewis Tappan, head of the Amistad Committee of La Amistad during United States v. The Amistad, and philanthropist Arthur Tappan, members of the family of Benjamin Franklin.

During the Utica convention, they adopted resolutions against Henry Clay as the presidential candidate of the country, stating that the "politics of this country is thoroughly corrupt and diabolical", that "all the sympathies of our beneficent Creator are with the oppressed, and all his indignation against the oppressor", and that the society's objective is "the entire abolition of slavery in the United States".

The Governor of New York Horatio Seymour, as well as the cofounder of the American Anti-Slavery Society William Lloyd Garrison, were part of the debates on the resolutions and the meeting lasted three days. Frederick Douglass was a key leader of the American Anti-Slavery Society, founded by Garrison and Tappan, who also served as its first president.

== Death ==
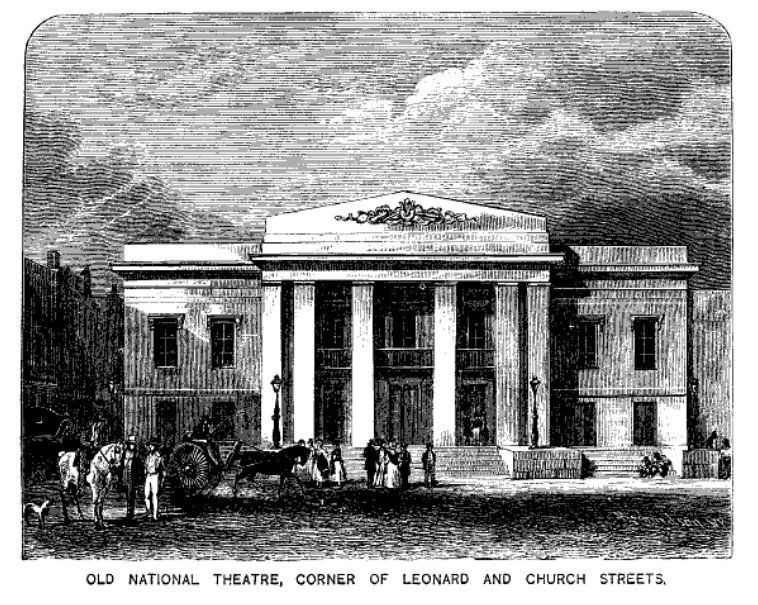
Lorenzo Da Ponte' Opera House, on Leonard Street, New York, 1833

Yale married to Clarissa Stephen Rogers, daughter of Jonathan and Mary Rogers, descendants of the family of martyr John Rogers, who was burned at stake during the reign of Mary Tudor. They had five children together.

A second cousin of Yale was Col. Braddam Yale, great-grandfather of Mary Yale Ogden, family of Commodore Isaac Chauncey and knight commander Henry James Anderson. She married Peter C. Anderson, great-grandson of Venetian writer Lorenzo Da Ponte, a partner of Mozart and Casanova, and builder of the first Italian opera in Manhattan.

Barnabas Yale died on October 11, 1854, at the residence of his son in Norfolk, New York.
