= Charles Eliot Memorial =

Memorial in Boston, Massachusetts, U.S.

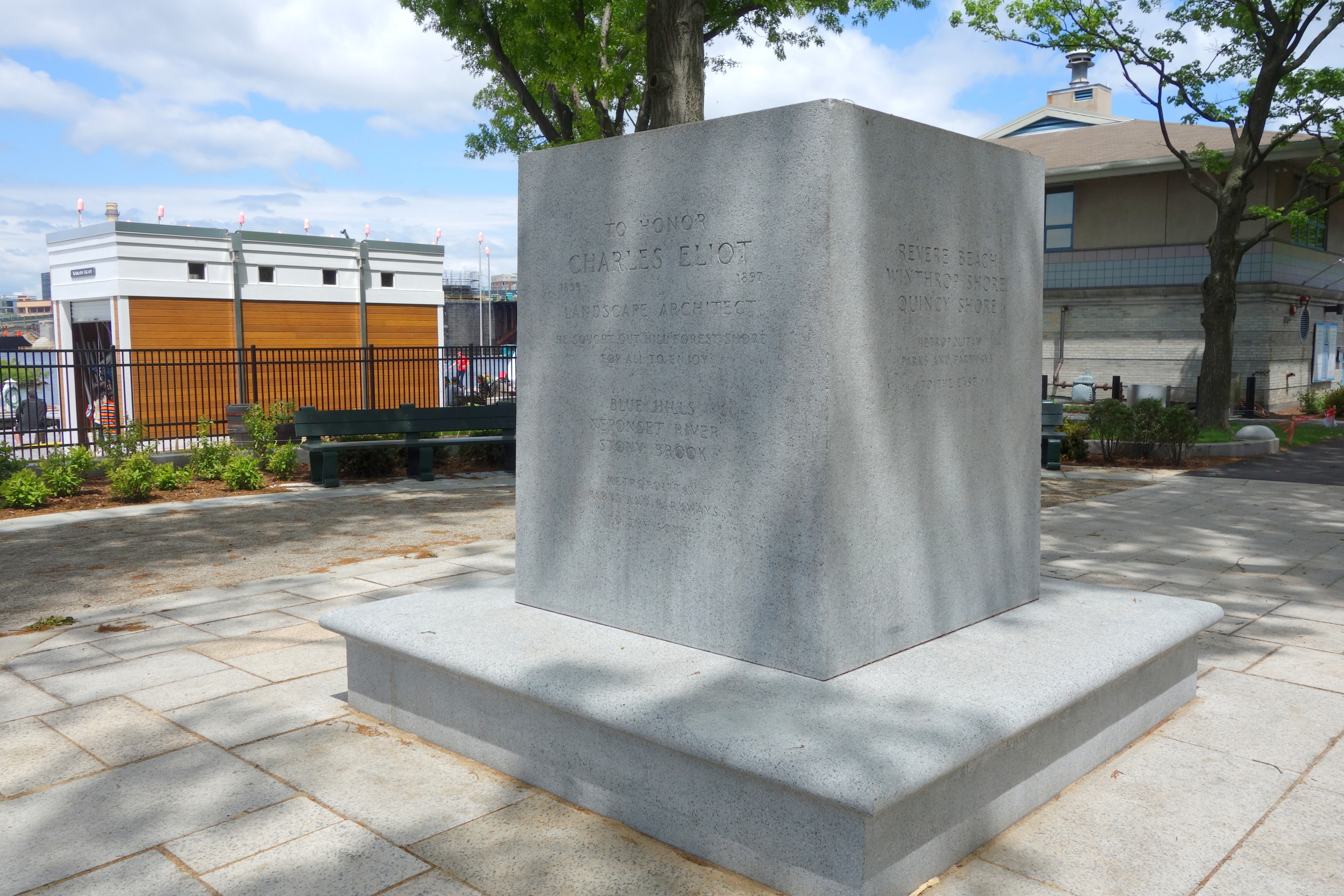
- The memorial in 2014
- Location: Boston, Massachusetts, U.S.
- Coordinates: 42.359483°N 71.073063°W
- Dedicated date: 1931
- Dedicated to: Charles Eliot

The Charles Eliot Memorial is a memorial commemorating landscape architect Charles Eliot, installed along Boston's Charles River Esplanade, in the U.S. state of Massachusetts.
