= Cyrus Yale =

Peace maker from Connecticut (1786–1854)

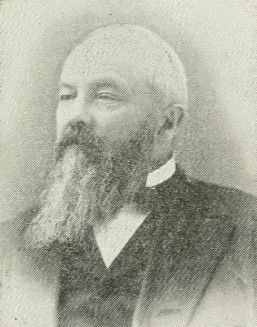
Portrait of Rev. Cyrus Yale's son, Yale Doctor John Yale of Ware, Massachusetts

Reverend Cyrus Yale (1786 – 1854) was an American clergyman, pastor, and minister. He was an active pacifist and was among the leaders of the temperance movement, having cofounded the United States Temperance Union with Stephen Van Rensselaer, the richest man in the country at the time. He was also a cousin of abolitionist Barnabas Yale and the author of the biography of Rev. Jeremiah Hallock and other works.

== Early life ==
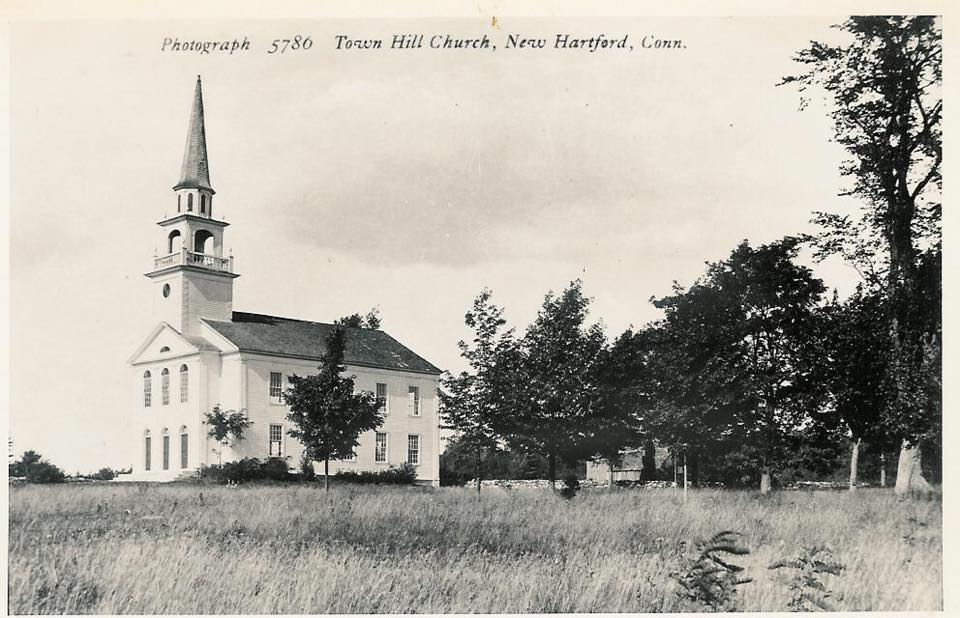
Town Hill Church, New Hartford, Connecticut, Rev. Yale was its fourth and last pastor

Cyrus Yale was born May 17, 1786, in Lee, Massachusetts, to Captain Josiah Yale and Ruth Tracy, members of the Yale family. Cyrus was the cousin of Rev. Elisha Yale, founder of Kingsborough Academy in New York, and of abolitionist lawyer Barnabas Yale, who petitioned Congress in 1838 for the abolition of slavery with Senator Silas Wright, and cofounded the Central New-York State Society in 1842, auxiliary to the American Anti-Slavery Society. His great-grandson was New York senator Mortimer Yale Ferris and his great-grandnephew was Harvard professor Edward Dana Durand, chief economist of the Department of Commerce.

Yale worked in his early years on his father's farm, then started teaching at a school in his hometown. He prepared for College under Rev. Dr. Hyde. He was first from Lee, Massachusetts, then he emigrated to New Hartford, Connecticut. Rev. Yale graduated with mention from Williams College in 1811.

He studied under Dr. Ebenezer Porter, president of Andover Theological Seminary, and obtained his license to preach by the Hartford North Association, and became a pastor of the church in New Hartford in October 1814. He was the fourth minister of the First Congregational Church at New Hartford, named the Town Hill Church at the time.

== Career ==
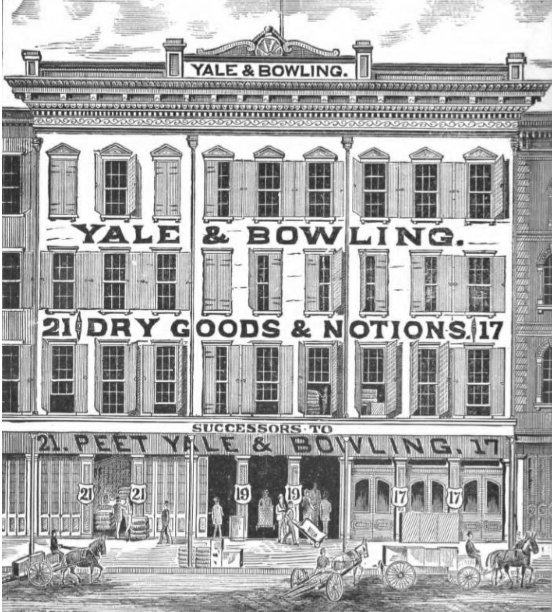
Dry goods business of Cyrus Yale Jr., Yale & Bowling, New York

Rev. Yale remained in New Hartford the rest of his life, except for three years, when he went to Ware, Massachusetts. He was the author of "Life of Jeremiah Halleck", being the Reverend's biographer, as well as "Miniature of the Life of Rev. Alvan Hyde D. D." and "Biographical Sketches of the Ministers of Litchfield Co.". In 1827, he gave an oration to the Adelphic Union Society of Williams College.

In 1828 and 1832, he is recorded as one of the original members of the American Education Society from Hartford, along with Gen. Van Rensselaer, Rev. William D. Snodgrass, and many others. During Rev. Yale's term, the old meeting house was retaken by the city in 1829, and used for holding town and elector's meeting. They then erected a new church in 1829, which would eventually be abandoned at the death of Rev. Yale around 1854.

As a peace maker, Yale gave a lecture to Hartford County Peace Society in 1833, a branch of the American Peace Society, promoting the idea of having the United States completely abstain from war in the future.

He also expressed his views on oppression and classes : "Here is no throne of royalty to be ascended or sustained by the sword, no rival lines of kings, no despot to swing his iron rod over trembling millions,... no titled aristocracy,...as an impassable gulf between different classes of the community. Ours is a land of freedom. The people rule".

Rev. Yale was one of the leaders of the Temperance Movement, being elected vice-president of the American Temperance Society, representing the state of Connecticut. He preached against all use of all psychoactive drugs, old world psychedelics, opium and alcohol. At the National Temperance Convention held in 1833 on Washington Square, Philadelphia, he became one of the 9 cofounders of the United States Temperance Union, which absorbed the American Temperance Society.

He was elected vice-president under president Stephen Van Rensselaer, a major general of the Van Rensselaer family, who was the richest man in America at the time, and one of the richest Americans in history. His wife was a member of the Schuyler family and the sister-in-law of Alexander Hamilton. Other notable founders of the union included minister John Marsh and abolitionist jurist William Jay, son of Founding Father John Jay. In 1846, Yale is recorded as a board member of the American Board of Commissioners for Foreign Missions. In 1854, he wrote The godly pastor. Life of the Rev. Jeremiah Hallock, which was published by the American Tract Society. Rev. Yale stayed the pastor of New Hartford church from 1814 to 1854.

== Personal life ==
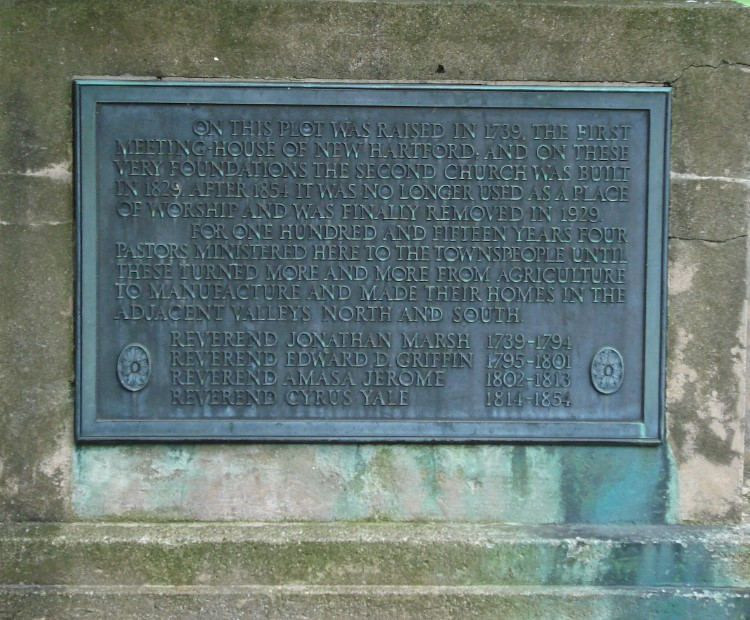
Memorial plate of Town Hill Church, New Hartford, Connecticut, featuring Rev. Cyrus Yale and others

Rev. Yale was the granduncle of Rev. Theodore Yale Gardner, George W. Gardner, and Jennie Gardner, wife of Attorney General James Lawrence, son of Senator and Congressman William Lawrence.

His granddaughter was Mary Yale Pitkin, wife of Charles Eliot, landscape architect of the firm Olmsted, Olmsted and Eliot, and son of the President of Harvard, Charles William Eliot. Eliot Sr. was a member of the Eliot family, cousin of poet T.S. Eliot, trustee of Andrew Carnegie and John D. Rockefeller, and a friend of President Teddy Roosevelt.

Eliot Jr. and his partners obtained the projects of Cairnwood House and Lady Meredith House, and under Olmsted Sr., architect of Central Park and Mount Royal Park, they also obtained the commission of the Biltmore Estate of the Vanderbilts. Another grandson was Yale graduate Horace Tracy Pitkin, president of the Yale Debate Society.

=== Marriage ===
Yale married to school teacher Asenath Bradley, who worked on Bradley Street in Lee, and had 9 children together. A few of them were Cyrus Yale Jr., a merchant of New York, proprietor of Yale & Bowling Co., Dr. John Yale, a Yale graduate from Yale School of Medicine in 1841, and President and cofounder of Brookfield Medical Club, Joseph Bradley, professor of music, Mary Eunice, professor at Mount Holyoke College, and Lucy Tracy, mother of Mary Yale and Horace Tracy Pitkin.

A descendant, Stanley Yale Shepard Jr. of Atherton, California, graduated from Stanford University in 1955 and became a fighter pilot in the U.S. Navy and Lieutenant Commander, before serving in the Department of the Interior. Cyrus Jr.'s enterprise, Yale & Bowling, was a wholesale dry goods and notions business, selling fancy dress goods, gentlemen's furnishings, and others items. He married Martha, daughter of Colonel Ira West.

Another daughter, Martha, married to Rev. Heber Hamilton Beadle, a Presbyterian minister from Princeton who gave a collection of artefacts to Yale University from his missionary expeditions in Asia minor. Another son, merchant Richard Hamlin Yale, married to Mary E. Wakefield, daughter of Dr. Luman, and became the father-in-law of Judge John Hanson Kennard, a descendant of Founding Father John Hanson. Family members included Congressmen James Wakefield, Lancelot Phelps, James Phelps and Samuel Ingham.

Rev. Yale died May 21, 1854, and was buried at Town Hall Cemetery, New Hartford, Connecticut. His funeral sermon was preached by Rev. Frederick Marsch of Winchester.
