= Leroy Milton Yale Jr. =

Doctor and New York Etching Club cofounder (1841-1906)

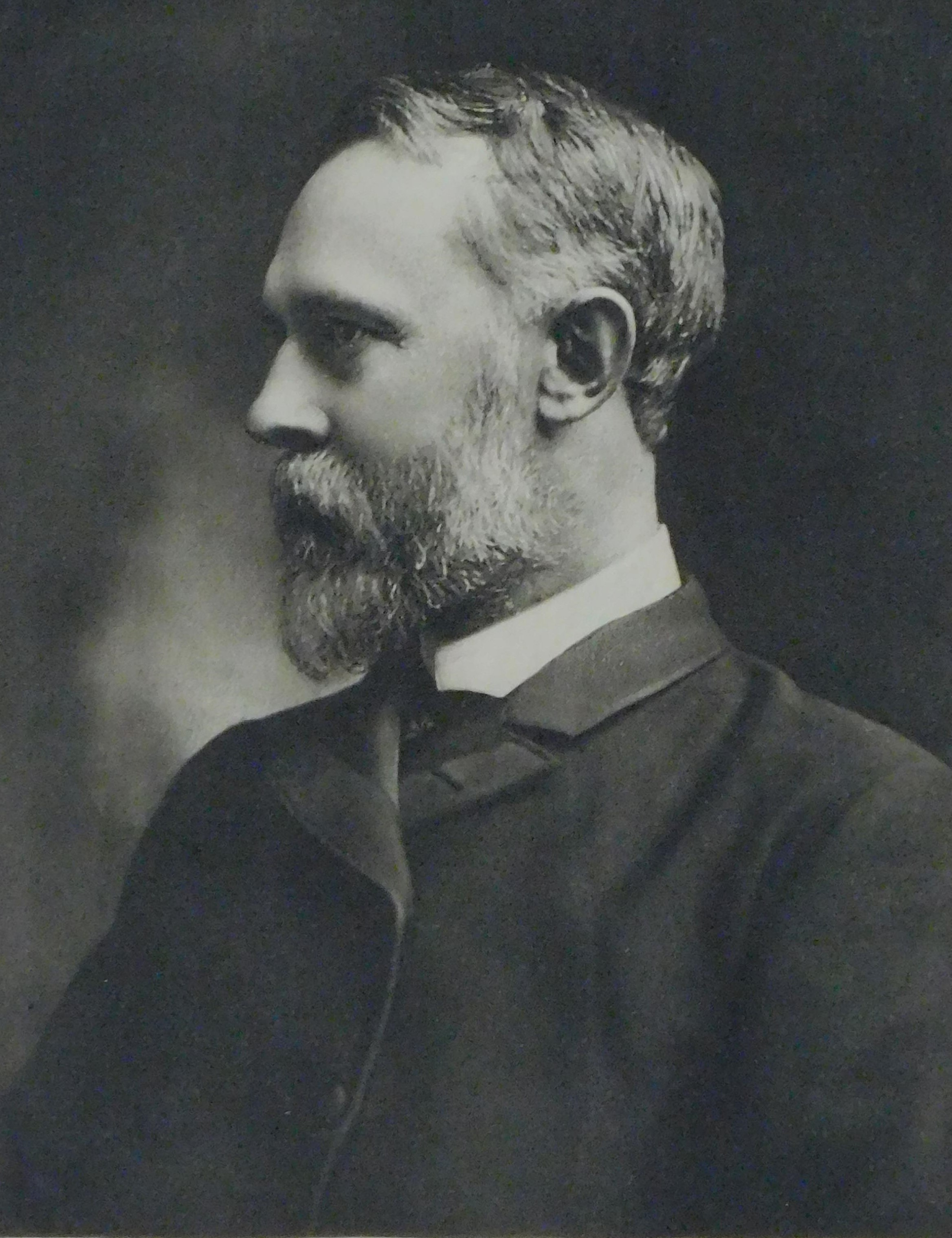
Portrait of Dr. Leroy Milton Yale Jr., physician, surgeon and artist

Leroy Milton Yale Jr. (1841 – 1906) was a medical doctor and surgeon from New York, cofounder and first president of the New York Etching Club. He was a member of the Social Register and wrote several of books and articles on medicine and etching. He also joined the Century Association as an artist, introducing various members to the club, and actively promoted the print department of the New York Public Library.

== Early life ==
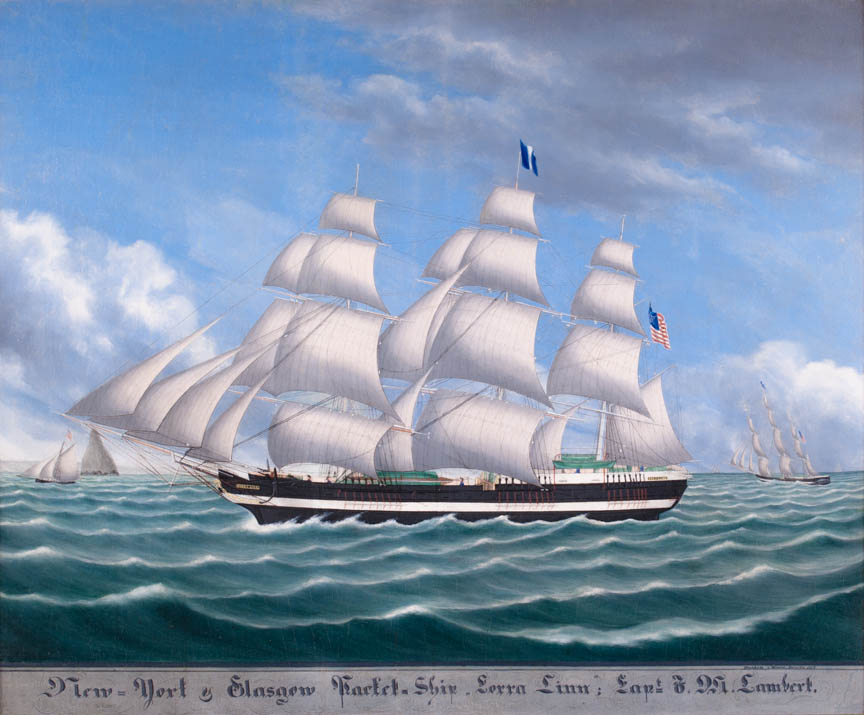
The "Corra Linn", an American ship on his way to Glasgow, Scotland, of the Carey, Yale & Lambert Steamship Company of New York in 1852, operated from South Street Seaport

Leroy Milton Yale Jr. was born February 12, 1841, in Holmes Hole, Martha's Vineyard, to Dr. Leroy Milton Yale Sr. and Maria Allen Luce, members of the Yale family. His father was the doctor of Martha's Vineyard, graduating from Harvard Medical School, and cofounded, with Captain Bradley, Martha's Vineyard Shipyard, named the South Wharf Company at the time. The L.M. Yale schooner was named in his honor by the shipbuilders, which was sent in 1849 to San Francisco for the California Gold Rush, never to return.

His uncle Burrage Yale was a wealthy tin ware manufacturer, and father of Burrage Buchanan Yale, cofounder of Lamson, Goodnow & Yale, a major gun-machine manufacturer and producer of Springfields Model 1861 for Abraham Lincoln during the American Civil War. He was a cousin of Col. Frank L. Yale, abolitionist Barnabas Yale and Yale Lock inventor Linus Yale Sr., and more distantly, of Rev. Elisha Yale and Col. Braddam Yale, family of Lorenzo Da Ponte and Commodore Issac Chauncey. He was also related to Col. Ira Yale Sage, a railroad builder.

His sisters Sarah S. B. Yale and Albina Yale married with the Carey and Dunham Fish shipping families, who owned the Carey, Yale & Lambert Steamship company on South Street Seaport, Manhattan. Yale Jr. was also the uncle of Maria Yale Fish, who married a Mr. Morse, and travelled to Europe during her youth, meeting with Miss Vanderbilt's daughter, an acquaintance, at the Randolph Hotel in Oxford. Her grandson Carey Yale Morse was a resident of Greenwich, Connecticut, and a member of the Indian Harbor Yacht Club and New York Yacht Club. He graduated from Yale and worked for American Water Works of New York.

The Carey/Yale/Dunham Fish families were proprietors of the Harbor House Hotel, Quissett Harbor, in Cape Cod. Notable guests have included the family of Charles Lindbergh and socialite Alice Roosevelt, daughter of U.S. President Theodore Roosevelt. Yale was also an in-law of Col. James M. Lewis, who owned two hotels next door, the Hammond-Chadwick and Jenkins houses. Through his aunt Lucy Yale, Yale was a member of the family of railroad millionaire Chester W. Chapin, a Congressman whose son owned a 20,000 acres estate in New York state.

== Career ==
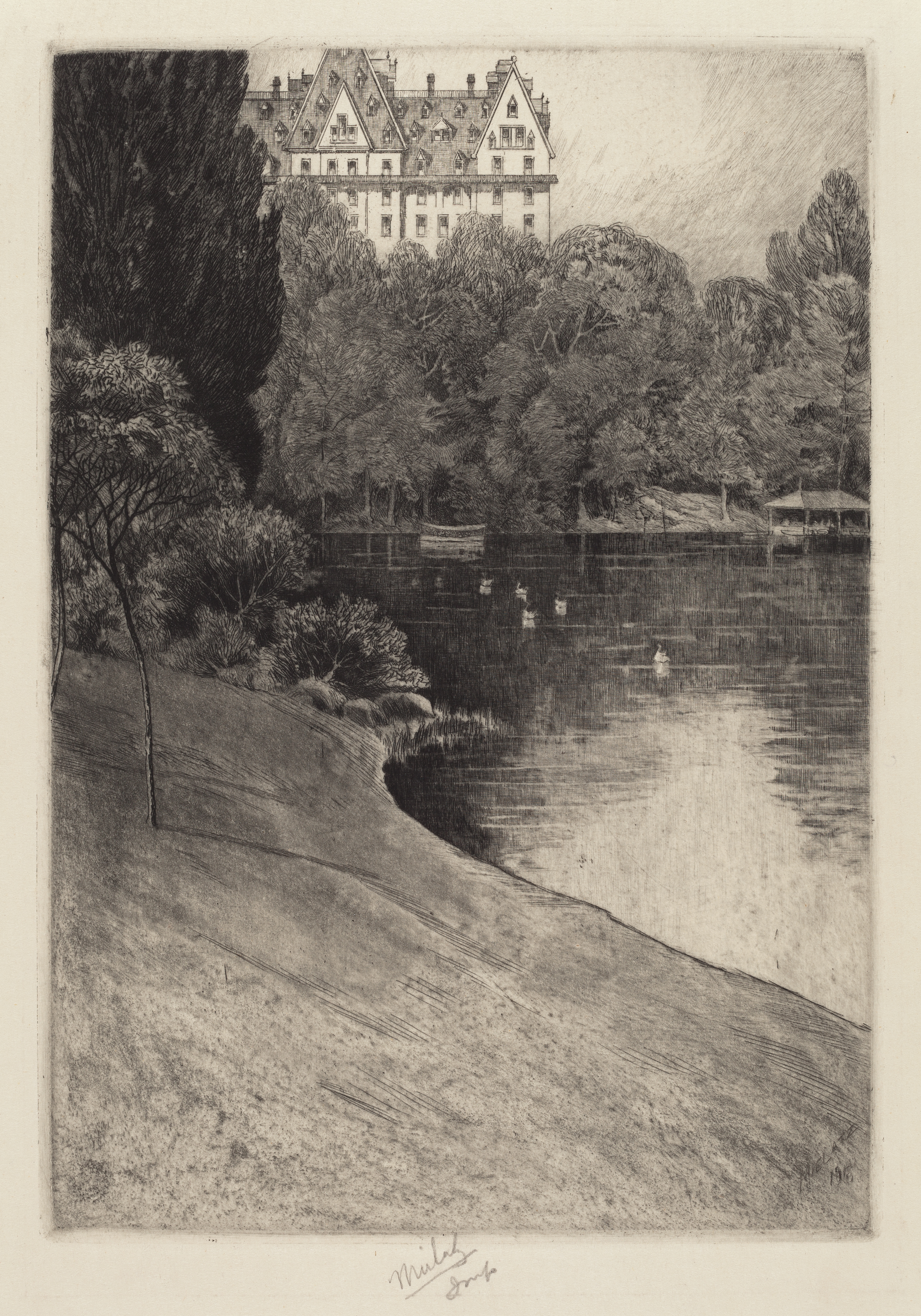
Plaza Hotel from the New York Etching Club, cofounded in 1877 by Dr. Leroy Milton Yale, member of the "Social Register"

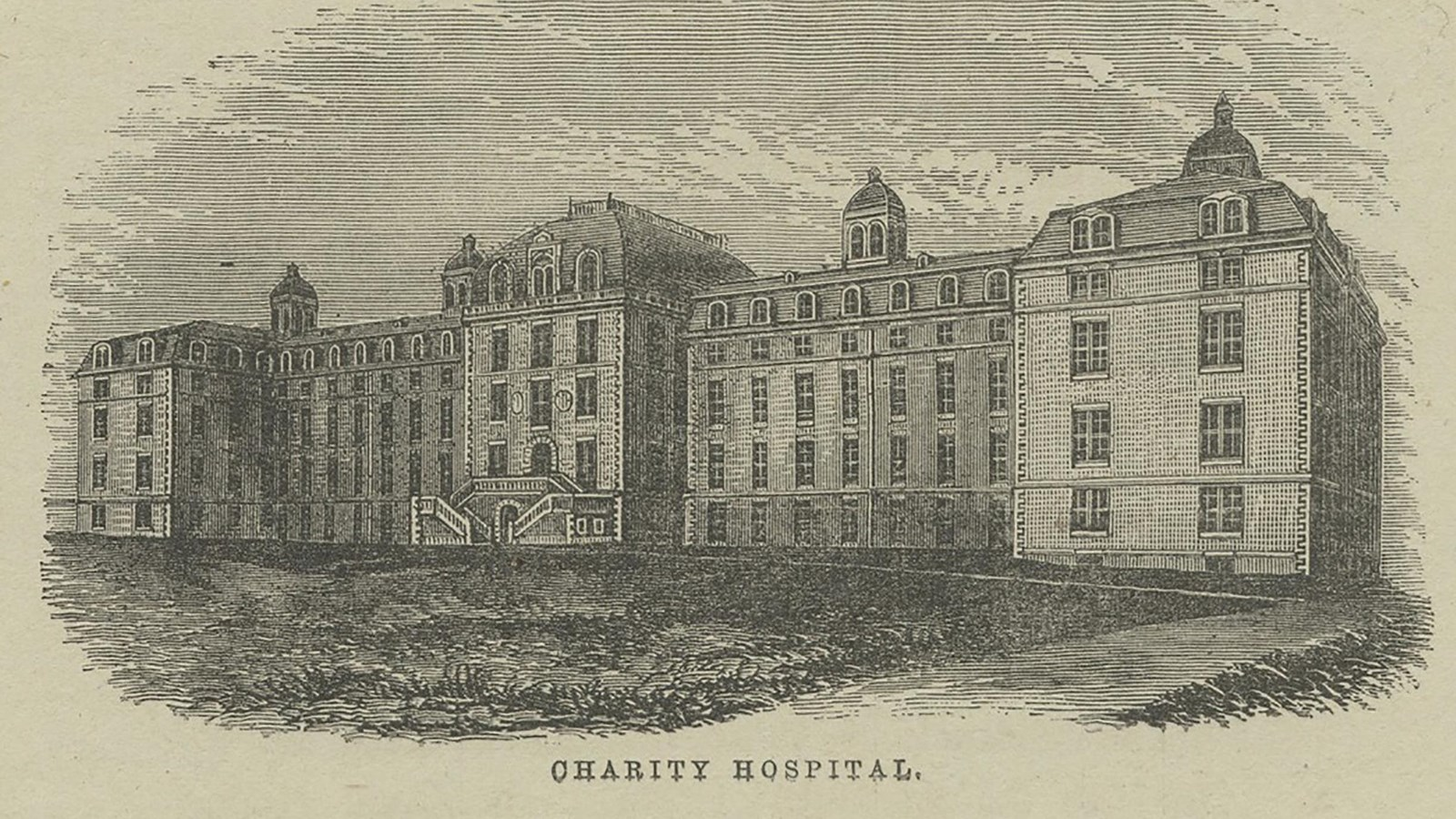
The Charity Hospital at Roosvelt Island, previously Blackwell's Island, near the New York City Lunatic Asylum, Dr. Yale worked at both locations

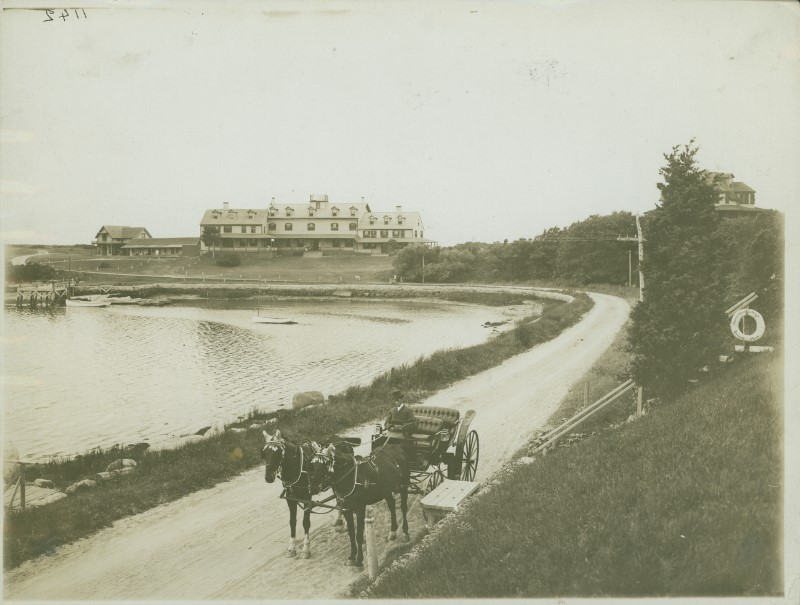
The "Harbor House Hotel", Quissett Harbor, property on Cape Cod of the Carey/Yale family in 1871, guests included the family of Charles Lindbergh and Alice Roosevelt

Leroy Milton Yale, Jr. graduated from Columbia College in 1862 and from Bellevue Medical School in 1866, graduating with mention from his class. He practiced medicine in New York City from 1866 to 1906. Yale worked as a doctor first on New York's Blackwell's Island, later renamed Roosevelt Island. The complex of buildings on the island included the Charity Hospital, a work house, a penitentiary, a female alms house and the New York City Lunatic Asylum. During his first summer there he struggled with a cholera epidemic, and was admired for his handling of the situation.

He started being a lecturer on obstetrics, his specialty being in pediatrics. He was surgeon to Bellevue Hospital, Charity Hospital of Roosevelt Island, and Presbyterian Hospital on Park Avenue. For many years Yale was a lecturer at Bellevue Hospital, and in 1870, was in the medical department of the University of Vermont. In 1872, with a group of academics and private dentists, they submitted a petition to Congress to urge the appointment of dental surgeons at the academies, resulting in the Townsend Bill of 1872 introduced by Congressman Dwight Townsend of New York.

The bill's objective was to create professorships of dental surgery at West Point Military Academy and US Naval Academy, but the bill was later rejected by the Secretary of War, William W. Belknap, after communications with Colonel Thomas Ruger of West Point about its need. His sisters’ marriages brought him to Quissett, Massachusetts, on Cape Cod, having married Stephen W. Carey and Thomas Dunham Fish, who owned a shipping firm in New York. The whole family stayed in the Quissett Harbor House during the 1870s and 1880s. In 1890, the Careys built a large house near the Harbor House hotel and across Quissett Harbor from Thomas Dunham Fish's homestead.

They sold a large piece of land behind their house to Dr. Yale. His home, named the ”Barnacle”, was built in 1892, and it overlooked the vast scene of Buzzards Bay, often acting as an inspiration for his art, etching and photography. Yale was co-editor of the Medical Gazette and medical journals, and wrote various works including "Nursery Problems," 1893; "The Century Book of Mothers;" "Phimosis," 1877; "The Mechanical Treatment of Chronic Diseases of the Hip-joints," 1878; "Remarks on Excision of the Hip," 1885; "The Diagnosis of Early Hip-joint Disease from Rheumatism, Neuralgia and So-called 'Growing-pains,'" 1893.

Dr. Yale wrote and authored two books on pediatrics. He also often traveled to eastern Canada for salmon fishing, and was described as a true American "Renaissance man". He did considerable editorial work on various medical periodicals and on a hygienic journal named "Babyhood", in addition to some literary work outside of his profession, and some art work as well, especially in etching.

He gained a distinct reputation in etching, actively promoting the practice of the art, and promoting the success of the print department of the New York Public Library. His home "Barnacle" was eventually demolished and replaced by a contemporary house built by Dr. McGowan, and the workshop was preserved with its etching content, becoming a museum.

== Etching Club ==
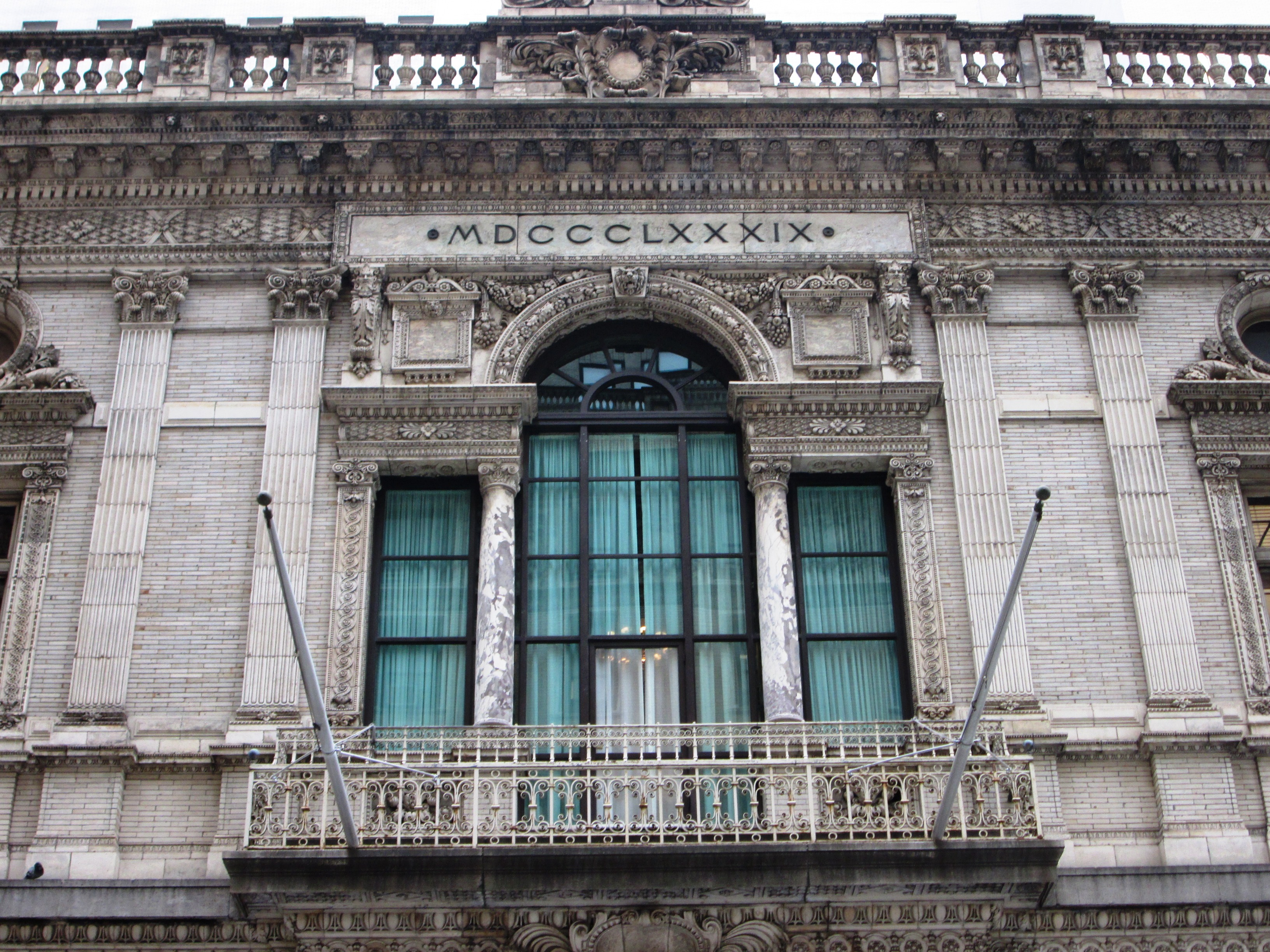
Century Association club house, a private social, arts, and dining club in Manhattan, members have included the Astors and Vanderbilts

On May 2, 1877, he cofounded with artists Robert Swain Gifford and James David Smillie the New York Etching Club, and became its first president. Inspired by the Etching revival in Europe, they founded the club to promote etchings in the United States. His etchings are held in a special collection at the New York Public Library, and many are featured at the Metropolitan Museum of Art in New York.

A prominent club member at the time was architect Charles A. Platt, who built Astor Court for Vincent Astor, Villa Turicum for Edith Rockefeller, and Memorial House for Sara Delano Roosevelt. Other members included artists Thomas Moran, painter of The Three Tetons, now in the Oval Office at the White House, Samuel Colman, partner of Louis Comfort Tiffany and designer of Mark Twain's home, and William Merritt Chase, founder of the New York School of Art.

Yale was a member of the Century Association, a gentlemen's club in Manhattan. His adhesion to the club was proposed by Secretary of the Erie Railroad, Augustus Rodney Macdonough, son of Commodore Macdonough, and by General George Sears Greene. He introduced various members to the club, including Walter Cook, architect of Andrew Carnegie Mansion and New York Life Insurance Building, Montreal, physiologist Graham Lusk, son of William Thompson Lusk, President of Bellevue Hospital Medical College, Ehrick Rossiter, an architect of Senator Orville Hitchcock Platt, and Lewis A. Conner, chief of the New York Hospital medical service. Dr. Leroy Milton Yale was also a member of the Social Register of New York.

== Death ==
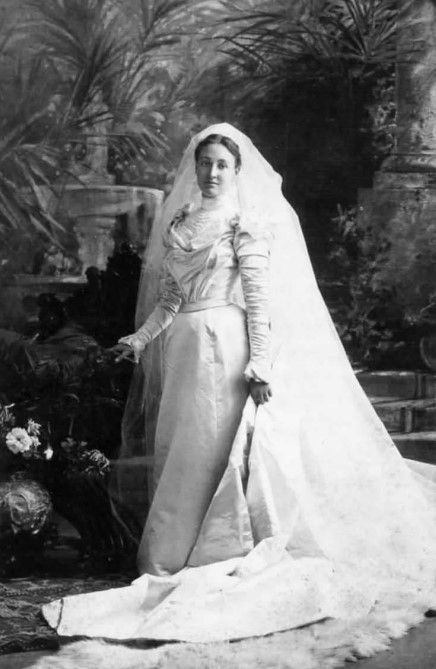
Dr. Yale's niece, Maria Yale Fish, wedding, 1898

Yale died at his summer home "Barnacle" with his family in Quissett, Massachusetts, on September 12, 1906.

He lived at 432 Madison Avenue, New York, and was married in 1881 to Julia Meriam Stetson, daughter of Harvard lawyer Thomas Meriam Stetson, from the firm Eliot, Pittman & Stetson, with Senator Charles Henry Warren and Congressman Thomas D. Eliot as partners.

Her mother was Caroline Dawes Eliot, daughter of Congressman Eliot, and were members of the Boston Brahmin Eliot family. Mrs. Yale's granduncle was William Greenleaf Eliot, cofounder of Washington University in St. Louis, member of the family of poet T.S. Eliot and Chief Judge William Cranch, nephew of U.S. President John Adams and cousin of John Quincy Adams.

They had three children together; Caroline Stetson Yale, born Jun 19, 1883, Leroy Milton Yale, born September 11, 1886, and Juliam Meriam Yale, born April 5, 1892.

Leroy Milton Yale Jr. was also the uncle of Mary Valentine Yale, who married to Capt. Eugene V. N. Bissell, of the family of shipping magnate Edgar F. Luckenbach. Their daughter, Mary Valentine Yale Bissell, married her third cousin, real estate millionaire Pelham St. George Bissell, grandson of oil industrialist George H. Bissell, founder of the American oil industry, and competitor of John D. Rockefeller, the Nobels and the Rothschilds of France.

== Gallery ==
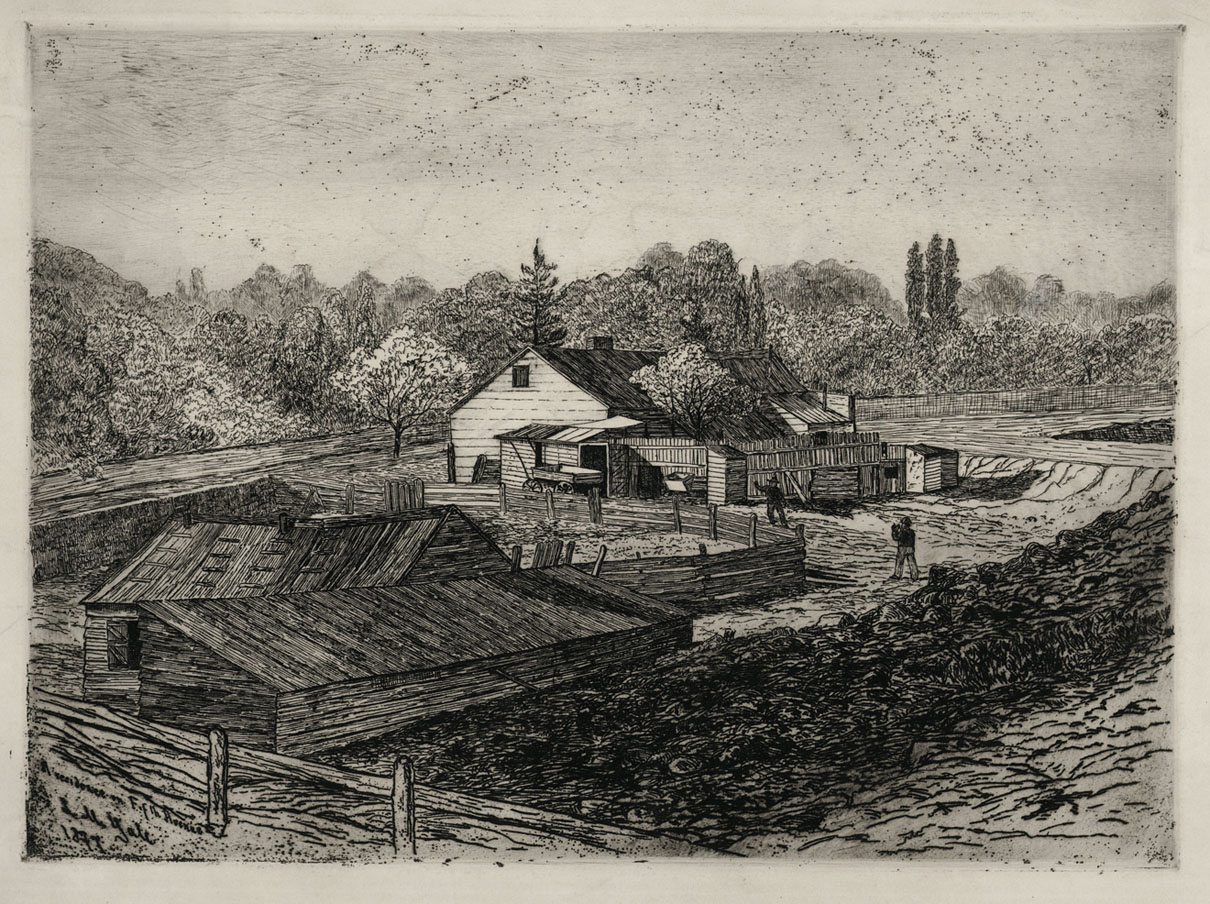

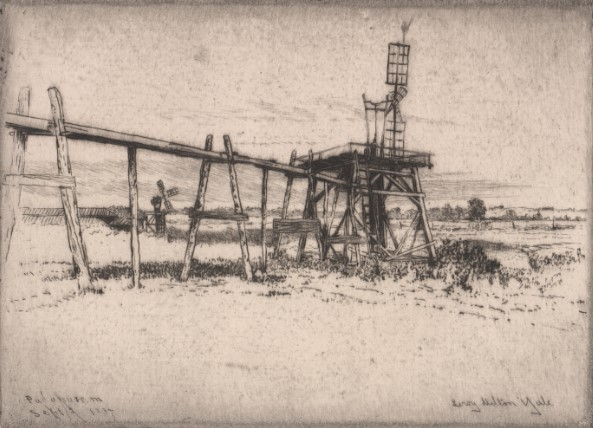

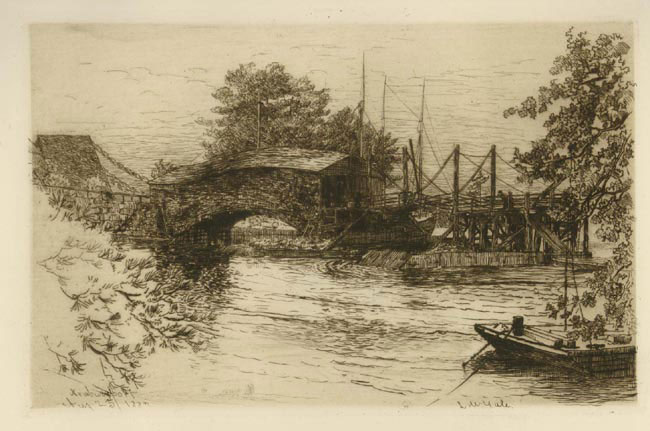

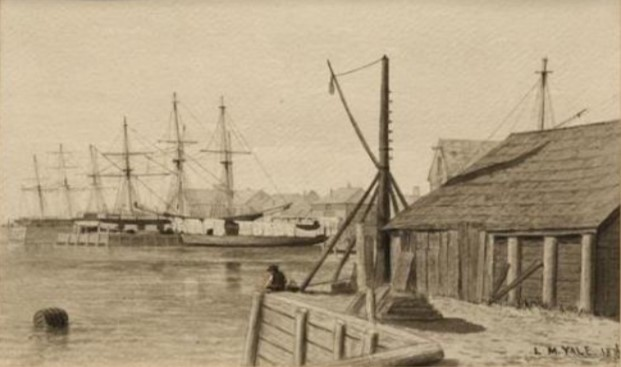
