= Madonna Church (Fort Lee, New Jersey) =

Historic church in New Jersey, US

- Church of the Madonna
- U.S. National Register of Historic Places
- New Jersey Register of Historic Places
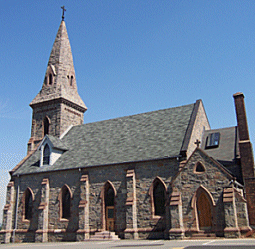

- Location within Bergen County, New Jersey Location within New Jersey Location within the United States
- Location: Hoefley's Lane, Fort Lee, New Jersey
- Coordinates: 40°51′37″N 73°58′44″W
- Built: 1854
- Built by: Henry James Anderson
- Architectural style: Gothic Revival
- NRHP reference No.: 76001145
- NJRHP No.: 488

Significant dates
- Added to NRHP: April 8, 1976
- Designated NJRHP: September 18, 1975

The Church of the Madonna is a Catholic church located on Hoefley's Lane in the borough of Fort Lee in Bergen County, New Jersey, United States. It was documented by the Historic American Buildings Survey (HABS) in 1939. The Gothic Revival style church was added to the National Register of Historic Places on April 8, 1976, for its significance in architecture and religion.

== History ==
The land upon which Madonna Church now stands was part of one of the first grants bordering the New Jersey Palisades. Given to Samuel Moore by British Army Major John Berry in 1726, this land remained in the Moore family's possession until 1829. As county records indicate, Jacob Riley purchased it and started construction on the chapel, which was subsequently completed by Henry James Anderson in 1854. A few years later, a rectory was erected at the rear of the church.

Reverend John Joseph Hughes, the first Archbishop of New York, appointed Father A. Cauvin pastor of the Fort Lee Mission in 1851, a position which Father Cauvin held until 1859 when he delegated his work to an assistant, Reverend Annelli. This decade saw the Catholics from Hackensack and Lodi gather weekly at Fort Lee for Holy Mass and spiritual instruction.

The most important individual in the young church's history was a layman, Henry James Anderson, whose remains lie beneath the church's floor with those of his wife and son. While seeing to the church's completion, Anderson, a convert to Catholicism, served as a surgeon and as professor of astronomy and mathematics at Columbia College in New York City. His energy and persistence won Madonna her first resident priest, Father Cauvin. The author of various scientific tracts, Anderson died suddenly while gathering information for one of these in Hindustan during exploration of the Himalayas, October 19, 1875.

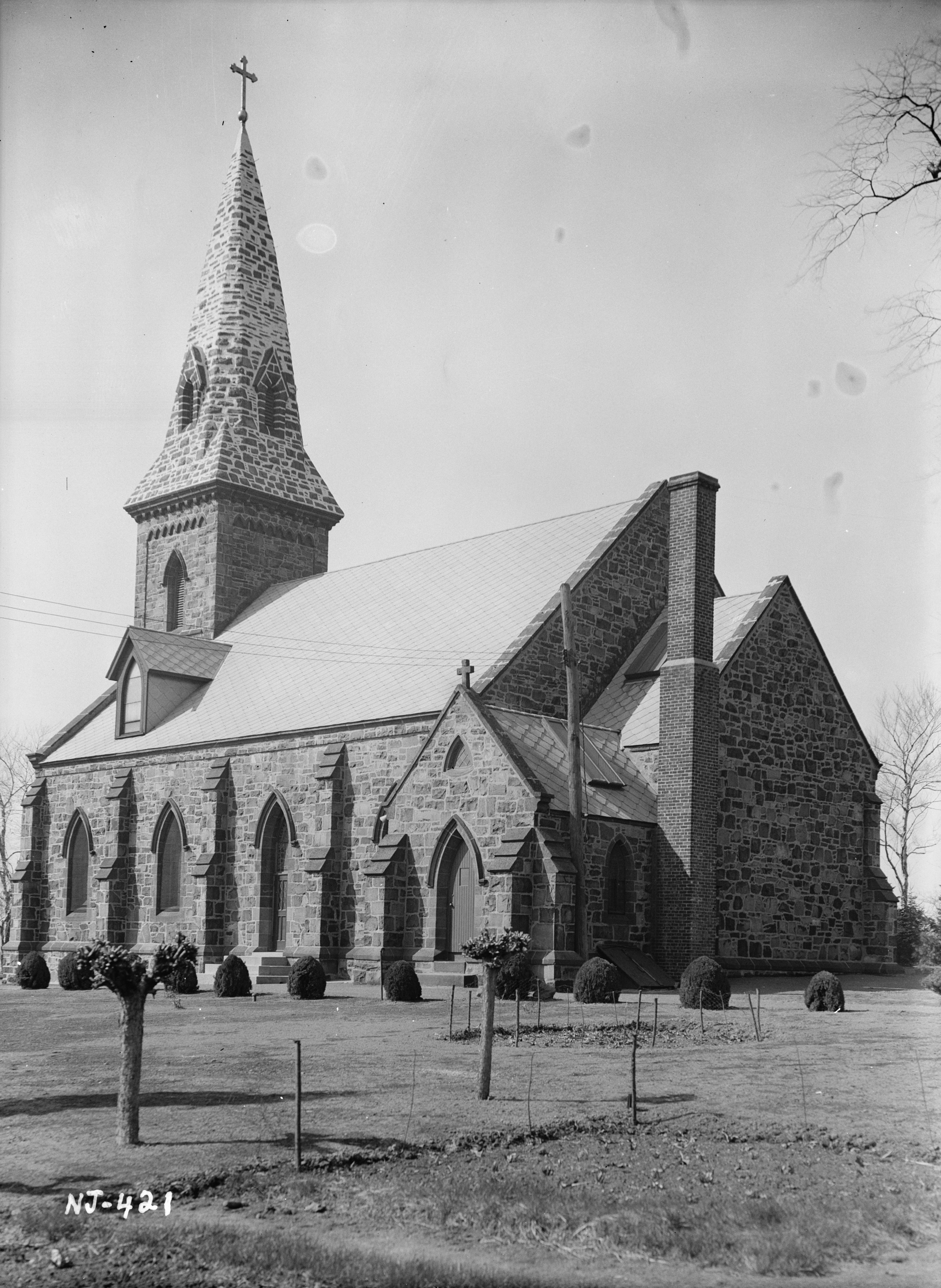
HABS photo from 1938

== See also ==
- National Register of Historic Places listings in Bergen County, New Jersey
