= Mortimer Y. Ferris =

American politician

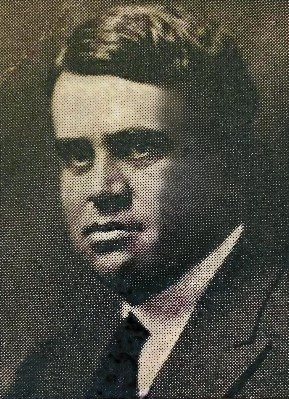
Senator Mortimer Yale Ferris

Mortimer Yale Ferris (March 29, 1881, in Brookline, Norfolk County, Massachusetts – March 9, 1941, in Ticonderoga, Essex County, New York) was an American civil engineer and senator from New York. He was also a Freemason, president of the Ticonderoga National Bank, and chairman of the Champlain Bridge Commission.

== Early life ==
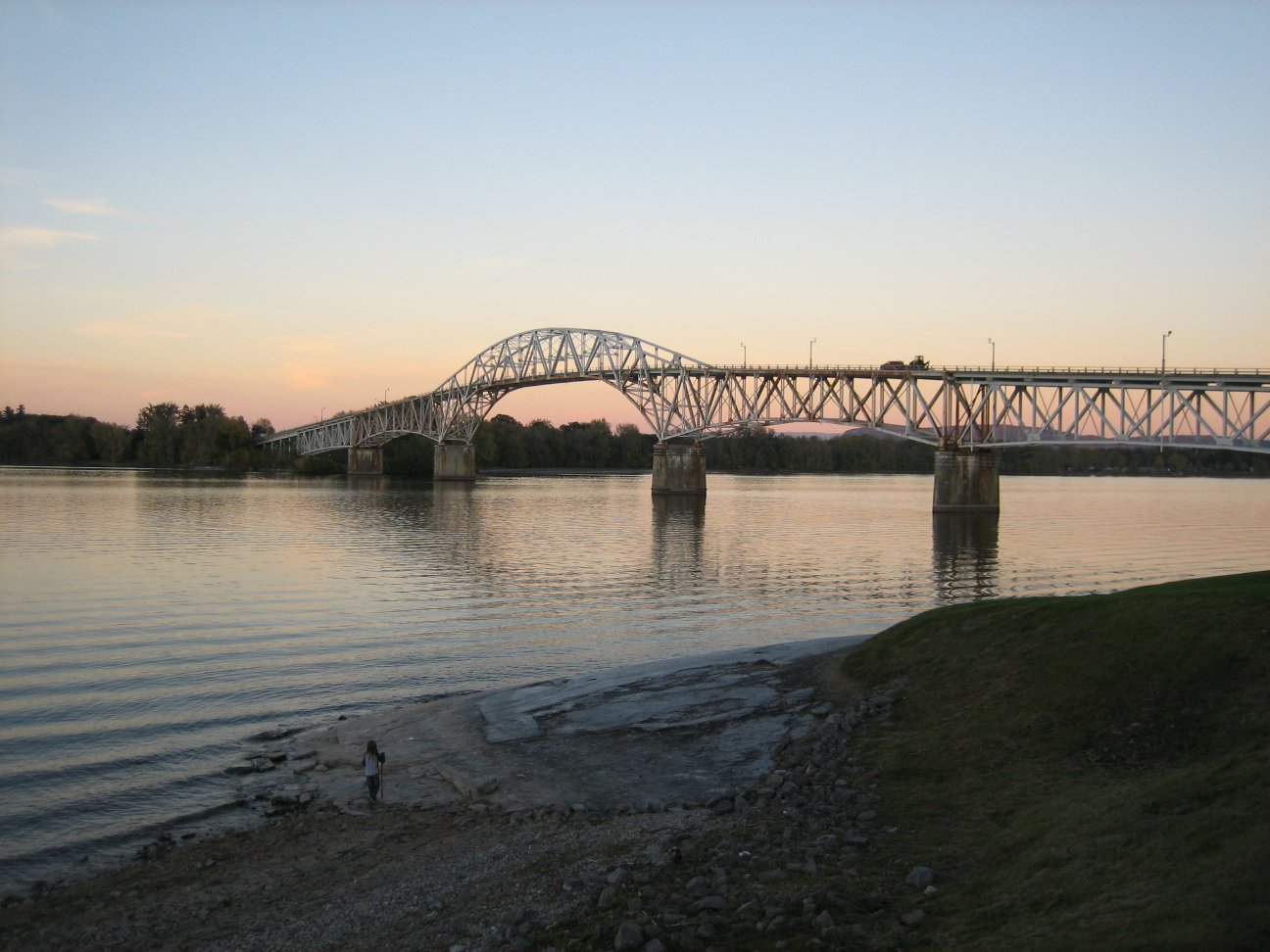
Champlain Bridge across Lake Champlain, uniting the states of New York and Vermont

Mortimer Yale Ferris was the son of Dr. Edward Mortimer Ferris and Marion Eliza Yale, daughter of merchant Cyrus Yale, son of Rev. Cyrus Yale, members of the Yale family. His brothers were Senator T. Harvey, Lt. Commander Raymond West and investment banker Cyrus Yale. Cyrus became board director and vice-president of Stone & Webster, an American engineering conglomerate in Boston, serving under president Edwin S. Webster. He also graduated from MIT and became a member of the Boston Yacht Club.

Mortimer Yale Ferris's nephew was Lt. Commander Edward Mortimer of HMS Byard, a graduate from Royal Naval College in London, and a notable yachtsman and businessman in New York. He was the grandnephew of Horace T. Pitkin and Mary Yale Pitkin, wife of architect Charles Eliot, son of Charles William Eliot, President of Harvard University and member of the Eliot family. Mortimer was also a descendant of Capt. Thomas Yale, who was brought by his mother Anne, and stepfather Gov. Theophilus Eaton, from England in 1637.

His father graduated from Harvard in medicine, working between New York, Vienna and Paris, managing the family businesses inherited from his father, a prosperous East Indian merchant. He attended the public schools, and graduated B.Sc. in civil engineering from the Massachusetts Institute of Technology in 1903.

His first employment was as an engineer in the International Mining and Milling Company. He was made a member of the board of trustees of Ticonderoga's Moses Ludington Hospital for 30 years, and for the last 20, he was its chairman. On February 14, 1905, he married Elizabeth Leavitt. They settled in Ticonderoga, New York, and had two daughters.

== Career ==
Ferris was president of the Village of Ticonderoga from 1916 to 1918. He was a member of the New York State Senate (33rd D.) from 1919 to 1926, replacing New York banker James A. Emerson, brother of Congressman Emerson. As a senator, he sat in the 142nd, 143rd, 144th, 145th, 146th, 147th, 148th and 149th New York State Legislatures. During his tenure, he was active on the Public Service, Canals, Conservation and Revision Committees.

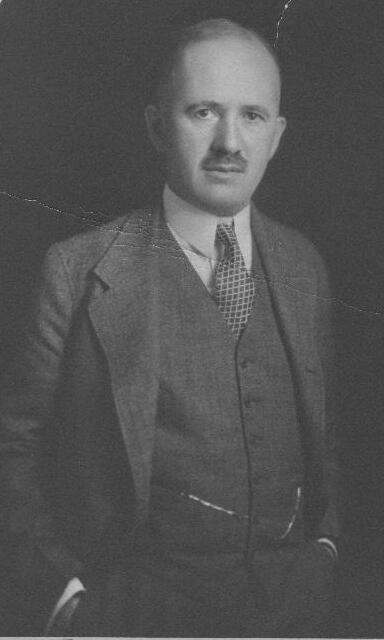
Portrait of Senator Ferris's brother, Cyrus Yale Ferris, MIT graduate, at the MIT Museum

He was replaced by Henry E. H. Brereton, cousin of Congressman Harmar D. Denny Jr., and great-grandson of Mayor Ebenezer Denny, who served Washington and Mad Anthony Wayne. After becoming senator, he became a member of the New York Republican State Committee, 1927–30; delegate to Republican National Convention from New York, 1928; and chair of Essex County Republican Party, 1930-39.

He was chairman of the Lake Champlain Bridge Commission which supervised the construction of two bridges over Lake Champlain: the Champlain Bridge from Crown Point, New York, to Chimney Point, Vermont, in 1929; and a second bridge, from Rouses Point, New York, to Alburgh, Vermont, in 1937.

For the official ceremony, his daughter Elizabeth clipped the ribbon, along with Gov. Franklin D. Roosevelt of New York and Gov. John E. Weeks of Vermont. They were joined by Maj. Gen. Hanson Edward Ely, Col. John F. Madden, and other members of the Lake Champlain Bridge Commission, celebrating the restored unity between New York and Vermont.

He was president of the Ticonderoga National Bank for many years, and a member of the board of education. He became a member of its Chamber of Commerce, and later became the president. His club memberships included the Freemasons; Scottish Rite Masons; Shriners; Elks; New York State Historical Associations; Sons of the American Revolution; and Lake Placid Club. He was involved in business enterprises as well as civic interests. He was also a member of the Episcopal Church.

He died on March 9, 1941, in Ticonderoga, New York, after a long illness.

== Sources ==
- CHAMPLAIN BRIDGE OPENS TOMORROW in NYT on August 25, 1929 (subscription required)
- NEW CHAMPLAIN SPAN WILL OPEN ON FRIDAY in NYT on July 11, 1937 (subscription required)
- MORTIMER FERRIS, EX-STATE SENATOR in NYT on March 10, 1941 (subscription required)
- Ferris to Be Buried Tomorrow in The Knickerbocker News, of Albany, New York, on March 10, 1941
- Bio transcribed from The History of New York State by Dr. James Sullivan (1927; Biographies, Part 58)

New York State Senate
Preceded by James A. Emerson	New York State Senate; 33rd District; 1919–1926	Succeeded by Henry E. H. Brereton
