= Henry James Anderson =

American scientist and educator (1799–1875)

- Born: February 6, 1799; New York, New York
- Died: October 19, 1875 (aged 76); Lahore, India
- Education: Columbia College
- Known for: Participation in the United States Dead Sea exploration expedition
- Scientific career
- Fields: Astronomer, geologist and mathematician
- Workplaces: Columbia College

Henry James Anderson (February 6, 1799 – October 19, 1875) was an American scientist and educator who worked with the great-grandson of Benjamin Franklin, Alexander Dallas Bache. He became Knight Commander, President of the Particular Council of New York, and Head of the Supreme Council.

== Biography ==
He was born in New York City, and graduated from Columbia College in 1818, he subsequently studied medicine at the Columbia University College of Physicians and Surgeons in New York. He did not practice medicine for long however, instead devoting himself to scientific and literary pursuits. He was appointed professor of mathematics and astronomy at Columbia College in 1825, when he was twenty-six years old; he retained his chair until 1843. Anderson was elected an Associate Fellow of the American Academy of Arts and Sciences in 1831.

He married Fanny Da Ponte, the daughter of Lorenzo Da Ponte, a collaborator of Wolfgang Amadeus Mozart. They had two children named Elbert Ellery and Edward Henry. Elbert Ellery married to Augusta Chauncey, granddaughter of Commodore Isaac Chauncey, and their son Peter Chauncey Anderson married to Mary Yale Ogden, of the Yale and Ogden families. She was the granddaughter of Olivia Yale, daughter of Colonel Braddam Yale, and was related to Edith Ogden, wife of Chicago Mayor Carter Harrison IV (himself a cousin of US President William Henry Harrison) and Aaron Ogden, the governor of New Jersey.

From 1840 to 1844, Anderson remained briefly in Paris where he worked closely with the anti-Newtonian astronomer François Arago, Carl Friedrich Gauss, and Alexander Dallas Bache (Benjamin Franklin's great-grandson), who later established the "Magnetische Verein" (Magnetic Association). In 1848 as a geologist, he accompanied the United States Dead Sea exploration expedition, commanded by Captain William F. Lynch.

His reports from the expedition, Geological Reconnaissance of Part of the Holy Land, were published by the United States government in 1848 and 1849. Under the aegis of the American Geographical and Statistical Society, Anderson circulated a petition urging the United States to promote Jewish colonization in Palestine, part of the Jewish restoration movement that flowered at the time. He was a trustee of Columbia college from 1851 until his death and was also professor emeritus from 1866.

Anderson converted to Catholicism in 1849; he was active in his new faith for the rest of his life. He was made president of the Particular Council of New York in 1856, and later the head of the Supreme Council in 1860. He donated land for Manhattan's St. Gabriel Church in 1859. He visited Pope Pius IX in Rome several times, and was eventually made a Knight Commander of the order of St. Gregory the Great. He made a pilgrimage to Lourdes and Rome in 1875; afterwards, he travelled to Australia in order to observe a transit of Venus. He planned to return home by way of India, but, after mountain-climbing in the Himalayas, he died of a disease in Lahore on October 19, at age 76.

He is buried in a vault under the Church of the Madonna in Fort Lee, New Jersey, a church in whose construction he had been involved.
