= Charles Eliot (landscape architect) =

American architect (1859–1897)

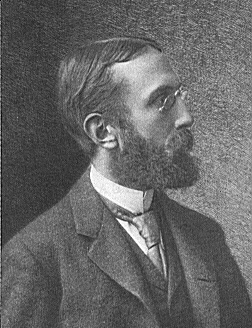
- Born: November 1, 1859; Cambridge, Massachusetts, US
- Died: March 25, 1897 (aged 37); Brookline, Massachusetts, US
- Resting place: Mount Auburn Cemetery
- Education: Harvard University
- Occupation: Landscape architect
- Known for: Metropolitan Park System of Greater Boston, The Trustees of Reservations
- Spouse: Mary Yale Pitkin (m. 1886)
- Father: Charles William Eliot
- Relatives: Samuel A. Eliot (brother); Ephraim Peabody (grandfather); Charles Eliot Norton (cousin); Robert Swain Peabody (uncle); Francis Greenwood Peabody (uncle)
- Family: Eliot family

Charles Eliot (November 1, 1859 – March 25, 1897) was an American landscape architect. Known for pioneering principles of regional planning, naturalistic systems approach to landscape architecture, and laying the groundwork for conservancies across the world. Eliot was instrumental in the formation of the Trustees of Reservations, the world's first land trust, played a central role in shaping the Boston, Massachusetts, Metropolitan Park System, designed a number of public and private landscapes, and wrote prolifically on a variety of topics.

== Early life, family and education ==
Eliot was born in Cambridge, Massachusetts, in 1859 to Charles W. Eliot and Ellen Derby Peabody. Charles had one brother, Samuel A. Eliot, who became a minister. Their father became President of Harvard University in 1869, the same year Ellen died. They were part of the prominent Eliot family originating in Boston, Massachusetts.

In 1878, Charles was admitted to Harvard College. In 1880, he organized the Champlain Society, a group of classmates who sailed to Mount Desert Island, Maine, for the summer. Eliot was its director. On the island, they studied botany, geology, meteorology, marine life, ornithology, and entomology. Charles wrote his parents later that autumn recommending to look between Somes Sound and Seal Harbor if they wanted to build a house on Mount Desert Island: "Somewhere along that coast you will find a suitable spot, with beautiful views of the ocean, and hills, deep water anchorage, fine rocks and beach, and no flats." A year later, his father purchased 120 acres and built what is considered to be the first summer cottage in Northeast Harbor.

On graduation from Harvard in 1882, Eliot remained at Harvard, pursuing horticultural courses at its Bussey Institute to prepare himself for the profession of landscape architecture.

== Career ==
In 1883, Eliot became an apprentice for Frederick Law Olmsted and Company, the architect of Central Park. He worked on designs for Cushing Island, Maine (1883), Franklin Park (1884), the Arnold Arboretum (1885), and the Fens (1883) in Boston, and Belle Isle Park (1884) in Detroit, Michigan.

In 1885, on Olmsted's advice, Eliot traveled to Europe to observe natural scenery as well as the landscape designs of Capability Brown, Humphry Repton, Joseph Paxton, and Prince Hermann von Pückler-Muskau. Eliot's travel diaries provide one of the best visual assessments of European landscapes in the late 19th century. Returning to Boston in 1886, Eliot opened his own office. His commissions included the First Parish Church in Weston, Massachusetts (1888) White Park (1888) in Concord, New Hampshire, Youngstown Gorge (1891) (renamed Mill Creek Park) in Youngstown, Ohio, and Salt Lake City's plan for a new town (1890).

On March 5, 1890, Eliot published an article, "Waverly Oaks", to defend a stand of virgin trees in Belmont, Massachusetts (near Boston), in the process making a plea for preservation of the oaks and outlining a strategy for conserving other areas of scenic beauty in the same way that the Boston Public Library held books and the Museum of Fine Arts pictures. This article resulted in a conference held at the Massachusetts Institute of Technology in 1890 on preservation of scenic beauty. This led to the enactment of Massachusetts legislation creating The Trustees of Reservations in 1891 — the world's first organization created to "acquire, hold, protect and administer, for the benefit of the public, beautiful and historical places." Within four years, Britain's National Trust was created along these lines.

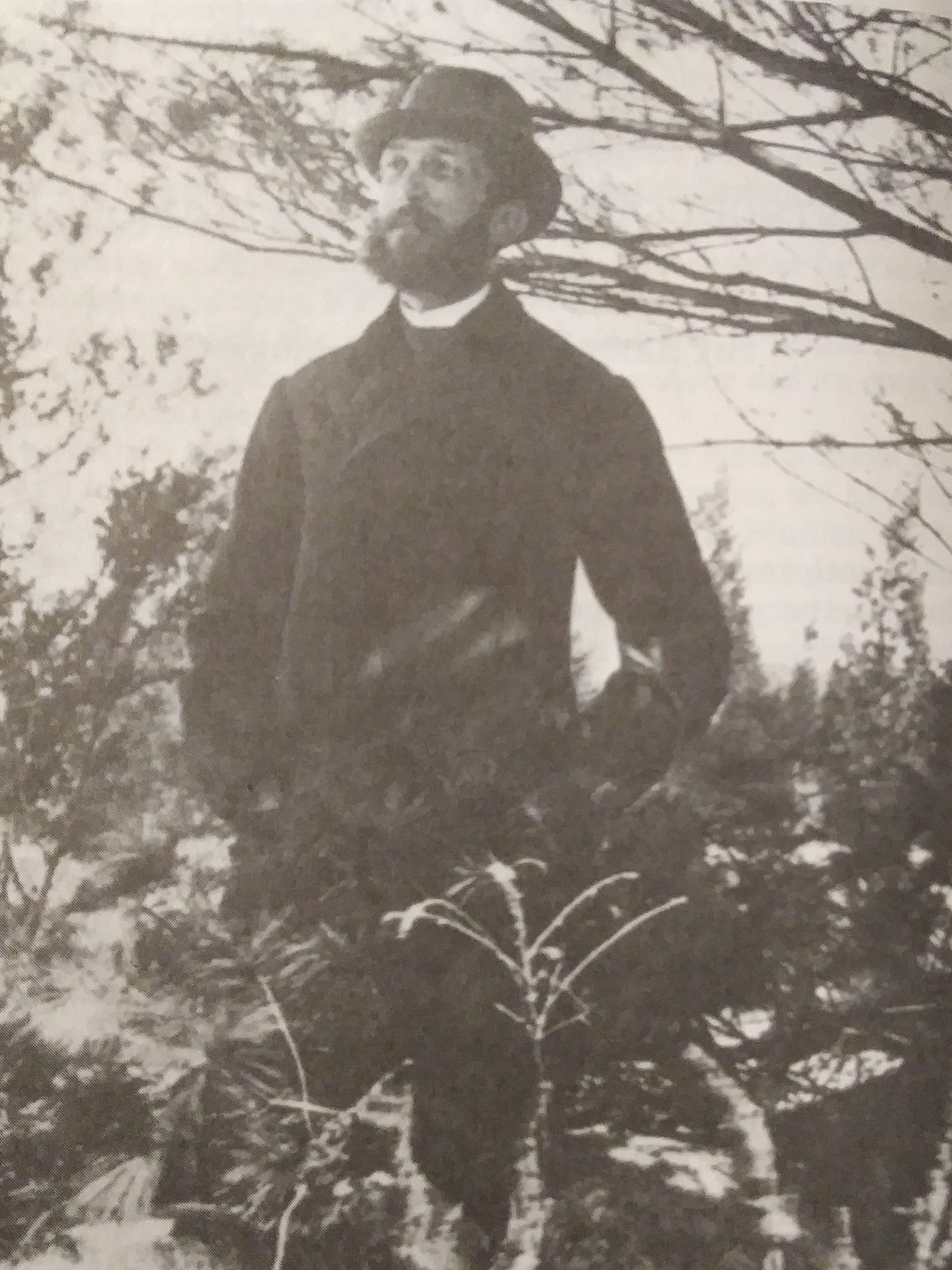
Charles Eliot, Brush Hill, Milton, Massachusetts. c. 1895

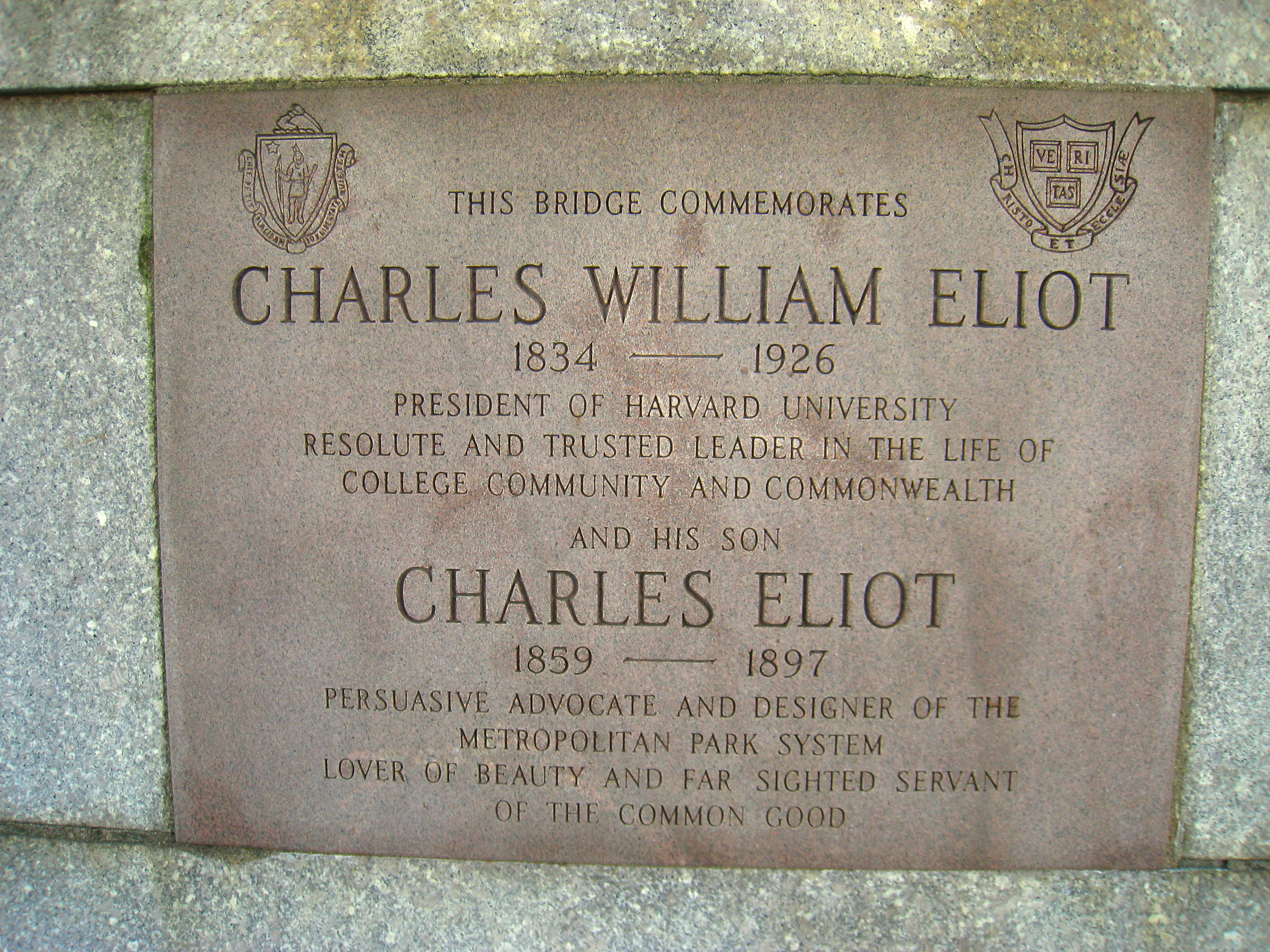
Eliot Bridge Memorial Plaque, Cambridge, Massachusetts

After the death of their partner Henry Sargent Codman, Olmsted's son Frederick Law Olmsted Jr. and stepson John Charles Olmsted asked Eliot to become a full partner at their firm. In March 1893, the firm's name was changed to Olmsted, Olmsted & Eliot. Within a few months, Eliot assumed the leadership role as the elder Olmsted's health continued to fail. Private commissions included the Cairnwood Estate, Biltmore Estate of the Vanderbilts in North Carolina, and Lady Meredith House in the Golden Square Mile, Montreal, Canada.

In 1895, the Massachusetts legislature ordered the taking of nearly three miles (4.8 km) of private seacoast land on what is now Revere Beach Reservation. The Metropolitan Park Commission was entrusted with the land in 1896. Eliot was chosen by the Park Commission to design Revere Beach Reservation for the best use by the public. Eliot stated in November 1896, "We must not conceal from visitors the long sweep of the open beach which is the finest thing about the reservation." Revere Beach would become "the first to be set aside and governed by a public body for the enjoyment of the common people."

Over the next year, some 300 structures were cleared from on and around the beach, the train tracks were moved approximately 400 yards away from the water, a boulevard was put in place to separate buildings and houses from the sand, and a bandstand and pavilions were constructed. An estimated 45,000 people showed up on opening day to enjoy the first public beach in the United States. Fittingly, the small rotary at the start of the beach's southern end is named "Eliot Circle."

== Personal life ==
In 1888 Charles married Mary Yale Pitkin from Philadelphia, Pennsylvania. They had four daughters: Ruth, Grace, Ellen, and Carola.

Mary Eliot was a member of the Yale family of Yale University; her mother was Lucy Tracy Yale. Mary's father was Horace Wells Pitkin, a successful businessman in Tennessee; Louisville, Kentucky; and Philadelphia. Horace's sister Emily married Seth Cheney, an artist. Mary Yale Pitkin's brother was Yale missionary Horace Tracy Pitkin; her grandnephew was New York Senator Mortimer Yale Ferris. Her grandfather was Reverend Cyrus Yale, a minister for 40 years at the Town Hill Church in New Hartford, Connecticut. The extended family often spent summers at their farm, Eaglesnest, on Town Hill Road in New Hartford.

Eliot died March 25, 1897, at age 37 from spinal meningitis.

== Legacy ==
Eliot's work has left a lasting mark on greater Boston. He published conceptual plans for the esplanades along the Charles River in Boston proposed earlier by Charles Davenport and others, and as the consulting landscape architect for the Metropolitan Park Commission, he supervised the acquisition of much of the riverfront in Boston, Watertown, and Newton. He also directed the landscape work on the Cambridge esplanade for the city's park commission. The esplanade in Boston was later realized following designs by Guy Lowell (1910) and Arthur Shurcliff (1936). In 1883, he designed Longfellow Park between the Cambridge home of Henry Wadsworth Longfellow and the Charles River. Up until his death he was the partner in charge of the firm's work at Fresh Pond in Cambridge.

In addition to his practice, Eliot became a regular contributor of professional articles to Garden and Forest magazine.

After Eliot's death, Olmsted's son and stepson reconstituted their partnership as the Olmsted Brothers, which continued for a half-century as one of the best-known landscape design firms in the United States, and went on to design thousands of parks, gardens, and landscapes in the 20th century.

Eliot's writings have been characterized as the inspiration behind the establishment of Acadia National Park on Mount Desert Island in Maine.

Monuments and memorials

- Charles Eliot Memorial, Charles River Esplanade, Boston, Massachusetts
- Eliot Memorial Bridge, Great Blue Hill, Milton, Massachusetts
- Eliot Bridge, Cambridge, Massachusetts

== See also ==
- Metropolitan Park System of Greater Boston
- New Hampshire historical marker no. 147: White Park
- The Trustees of Reservations

== Additional reading ==
- Birnbaum, Charles A.; Karson, Robin (2000). Pioneers of American Landscape Design. McGraw Hill Companies. ISBN 0-07-134420-9.
