= Horace Tracy Pitkin =

American missionary

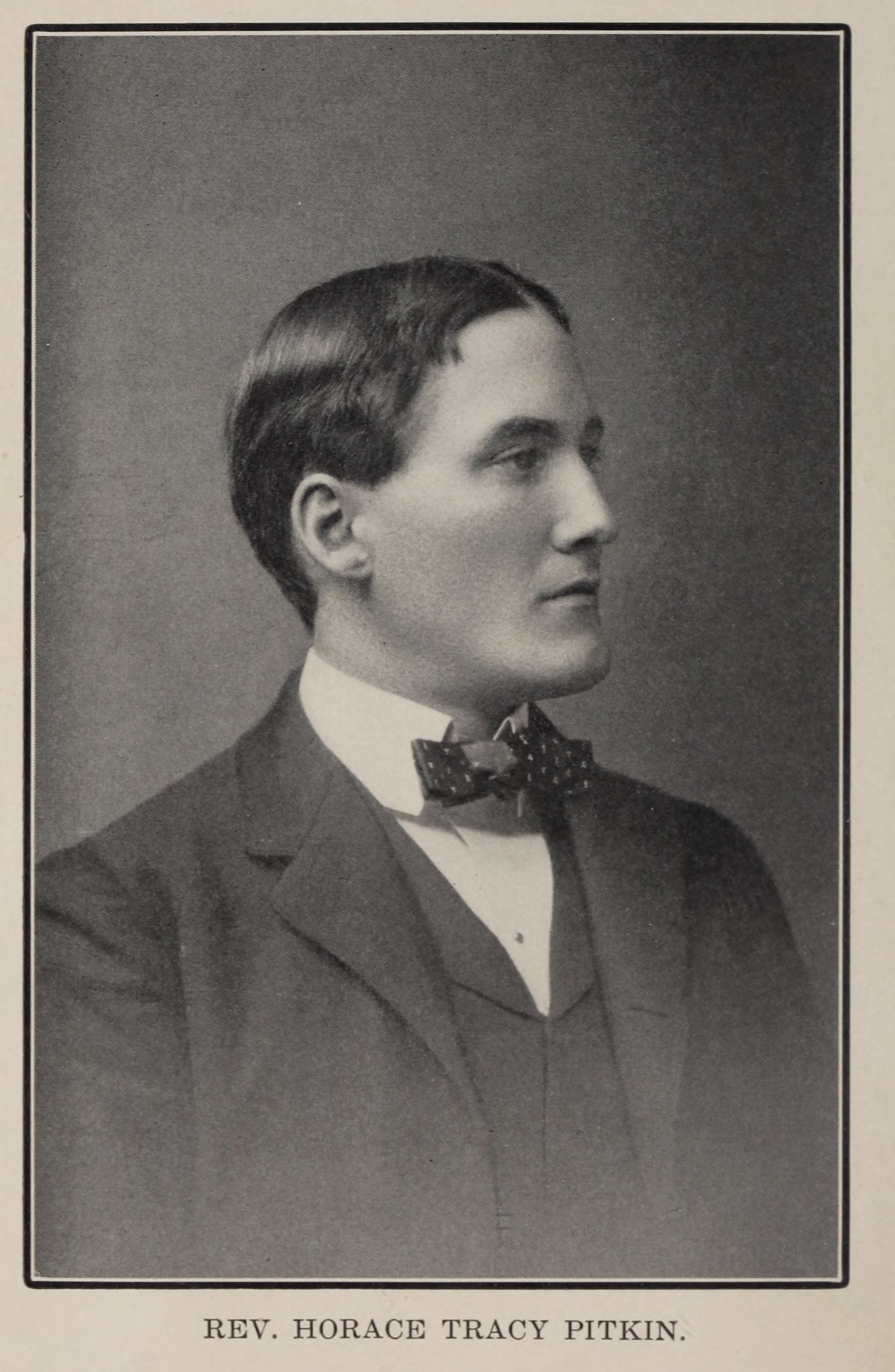
Horace Tracy Pitkin

Horace Tracy Pitkin (1869–1900) was a missionary in China of the American Board of Commissioners for Foreign Missions. Chinese Boxers killed him during the Boxer Uprising in 1900. Yale China Mission, (now the Yale-China Association), was founded in his memory.

== Early life and decision for China ==
Pitkin was born in Philadelphia to Horace Wells Pitkin and Lucy Tracy Yale, daughter of Rev. Cyrus Yale. His father was a merchant with government stores in Philadelphia and Louisville and acquired a generous fortune. His uncle was artist Seth Wells Cheney, brother of Ward Cheney, and his grandnephew was NY Senator Mortimer Yale Ferris.

On his father's side, he was a descendant of attorney general William Pitkin IV, grandfather of Gov. William Pitkin, the cousin of Founding Father Oliver Wolcott, and on his mother's side, he was a descendant of the family of Elihu Yale, the founder of Yale College. His sister was Mary Yale Pitkin, wife of landscape architect Charles Eliot, son of Charles William Eliot, President of Harvard University, and member of the Eliot family. Charles's architectural firm had the contract of Biltmore's landscape and was a cousin of T.S. Eliot.

The Pitkin family settled in Manchester (Connecticut). Entering Phillips Exeter Academy in Exeter, New Hampshire, in 1884 Pitkin took a leading role in the campus Christian Endeavor movement. Entering Yale in 1888, he excelled in music, writing, and volunteer activities. He was widely admired for his sunny disposition and strong convictions.

In the summer of 1889 at Dwight L. Moody's Northfield (Massachusetts) School, he signed the Student Volunteer Movement (SVM) pledge, indicating his intention to become a missionary. Following graduation from Yale in 1892, he entered Union Theological Seminary, New York, then spent an interim year as traveling secretary for the SVM. In 1894, with his fiancee, Letitia Thomas, a graduate of Mount Holyoke College, Massachusetts, he offered himself for service with the American Board of Commissioners for Foreign Missions.

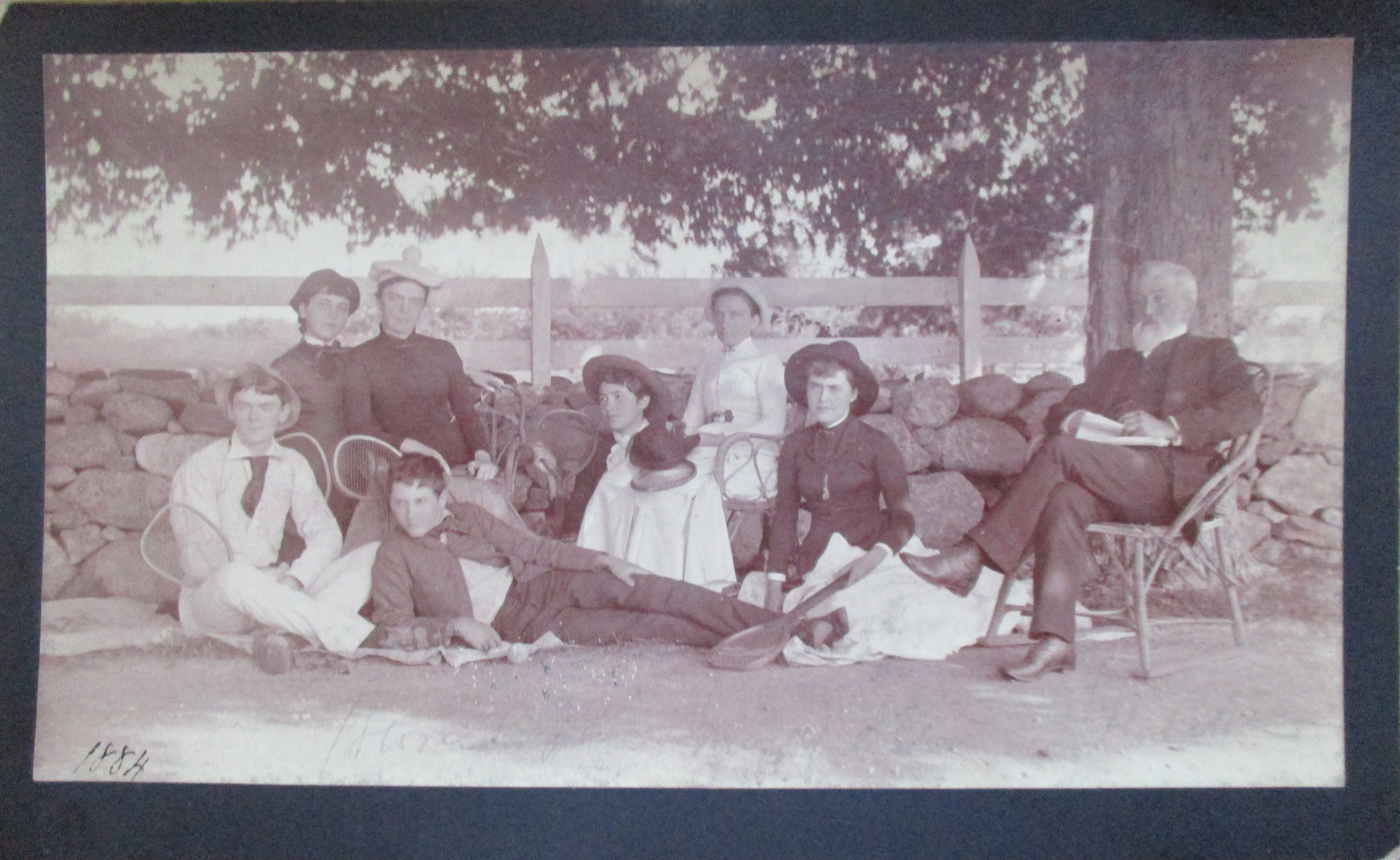
Pitkin Family at "Eaglesnest" New Hartford Connecticut, 1884. Horace Tracy Pitkin 2nd from left lying down, Father Horice Wells Pitkin far right, Sister Mary Yale Pitkin 2nd from right, Mother Lucy Tracy Yale 3rd from right in back

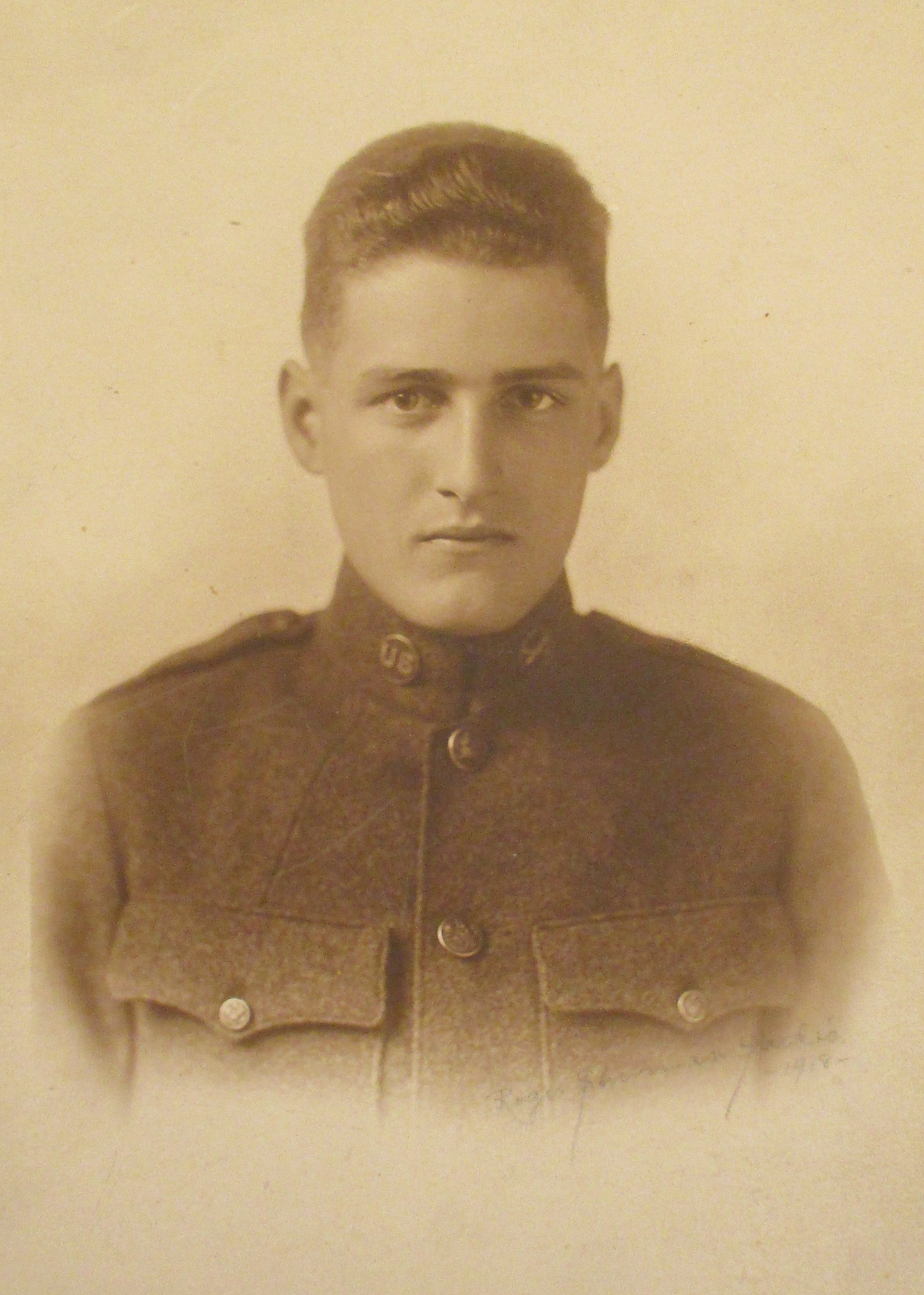
Horace Tracy Pitkin in Formal Attire Circa 1898

== Work in China and death ==
Pitkin graduated from Union Theological Seminary in 1896, then he and Letitia were married. The couple sailed from New York in November 1896, traveled through the Holy Land, Egypt, and India before landing at Tianjin in May 1897. At Baoding, in present-day Hebei province, he joined the ABCFM mission.

During the Boxer Rebellion in 1900, the missionary compound in Baoding was overrun by anti-missionary and anti-foreign Chinese Boxers. Pitkin was killed and the other missionaries serving in the city were also killed or later executed. In all, fourteen Presbyterian, Congregational, amid China Inland Mission missionaries were killed at Baoding. Letitia and an infant son were in the United States when Pitkin was killed.

Pitkin's death motivated several students at Yale to create an organization to send missionaries to China. One said that "Pitkin's martyrdom... made me determined to see if possible that Pitkin's sacrifice was atoned for somehow by us as Yale men." The Yale Mission in China was established in June 1901.
