= Frank L. Yale =

Businessman from Joplin, Missouri

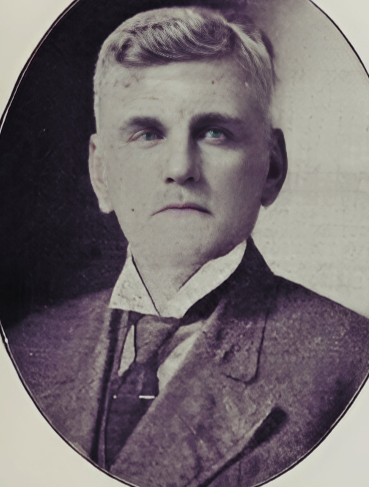
Frank L. Yale, merchant, politician and mining banker of Joplin, Missouri

Colonel Franklin L. Yale (1848 – 1930) was a prominent businessman and politician from Joplin, Missouri, who cofounded the Joplin Stock Exchange. He served the Democrats as Chairman of Jasper County under Gov. William J. Stone, and was made a member of Joplin City Council. He was also a mining investor and broker, and was involved in the development of the railroads.

== Early life ==
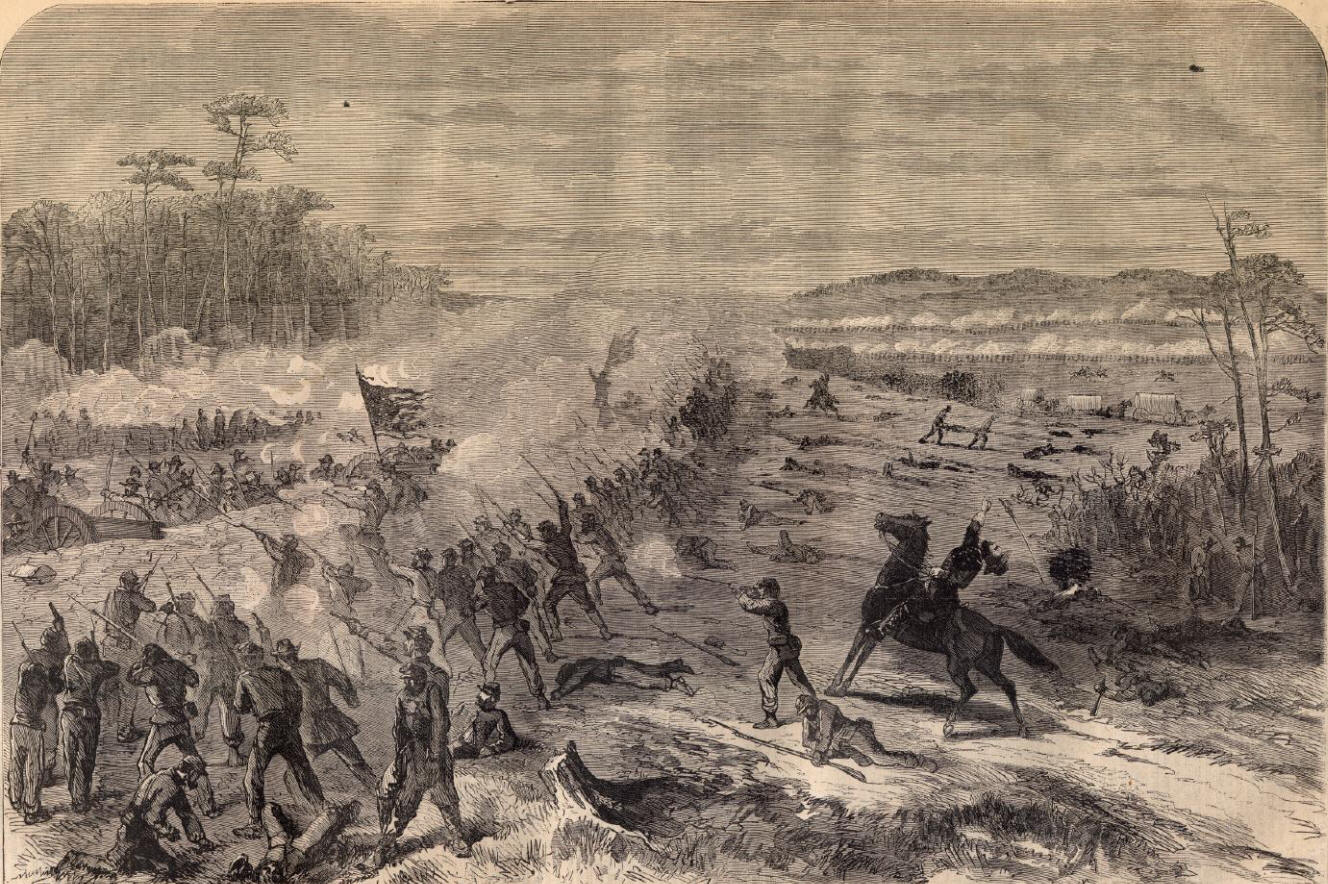
Battle of Nashville during the American Civil War, Yale was one of its soldiers

Frank L. Yale was born on April 14, 1848, in Knoxville, Illinois, and lived on a family farm until he was 15 years of age. His parents were Gad Lowery Yale and Abbey Reed, members of the Yale family. His brother was Rodney Horace Yale, who attended Yale District school in Yale, Michigan. He became the author of the Yale Genealogy book, and Secretary and board director of Dempsters, Nebraska, which would later be sold to billionaire Warren Buffett of Berkshire Hathaway. Rodney also later cofounded the Globe Oil Company in Beatrice, Nebraska, with a capital stock of $500,000 in 1903, drilling oil fields in Wyoming. Yale's cousins were Dr. Leroy Milton Yale Jr. of New York and tinware manufacturer Burrage Yale of Massachusetts.

At 15 years of age, Yale joined the Union Army during the American Civil War, becoming a soldier of the 112th Infantry Regiment. He was with General Sherman's company for the march from Chattanooga to Nashville. He became a corporal in the 65th Infantry, and at his return, became a veteran of the Civil War. He participated in number of engagements for three years, including the Battles of Kennesaw Mountain, Peach Tree Creek, Atlanta campaign, Franklin Battlefield and the Battle of Nashville.

== Biography ==
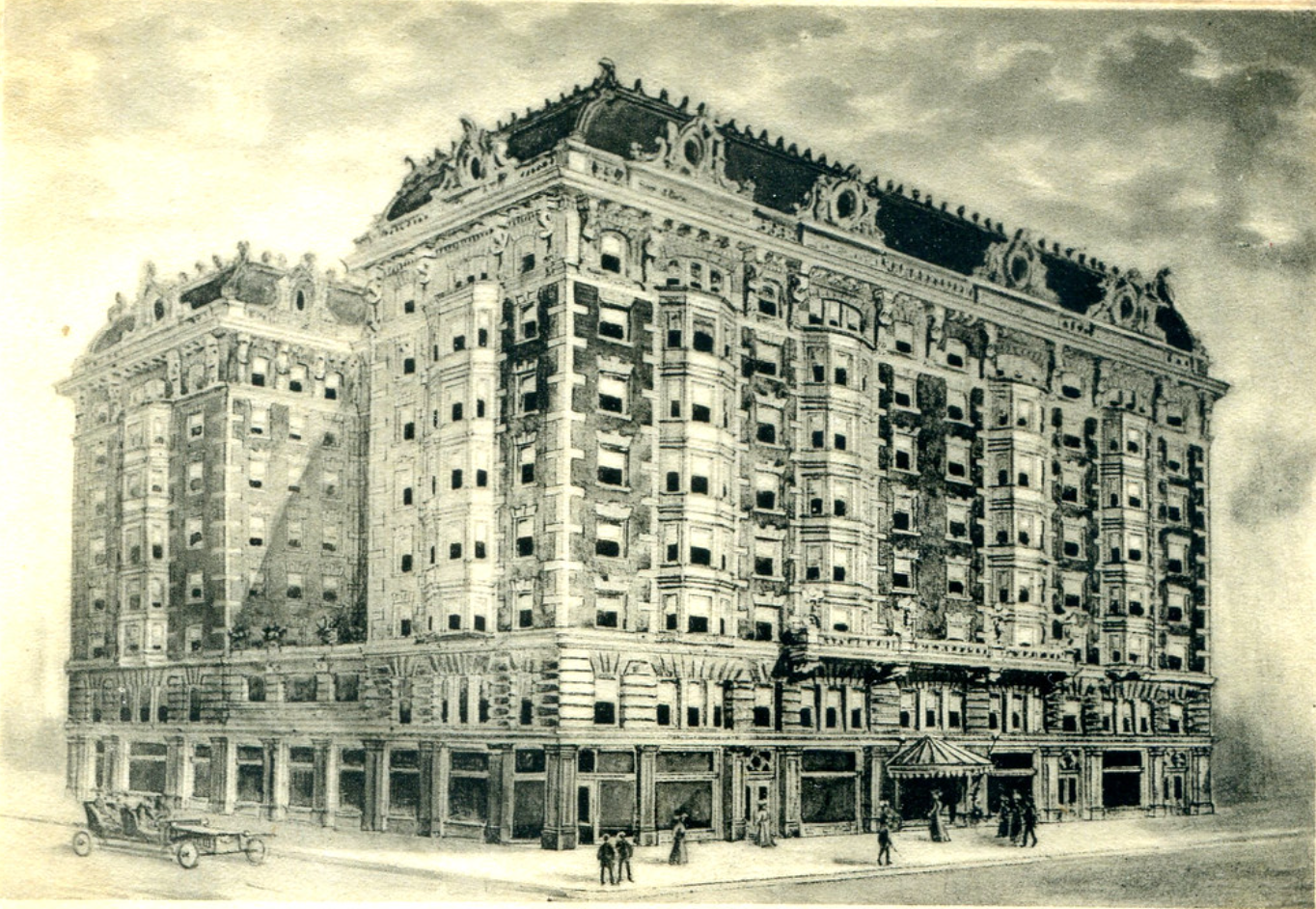
Connor Hotel, c. 1908, opening banquet of the Joplin Stock Exchange, with a speech made by the Secretary of State of Missouri, John E. Swanger

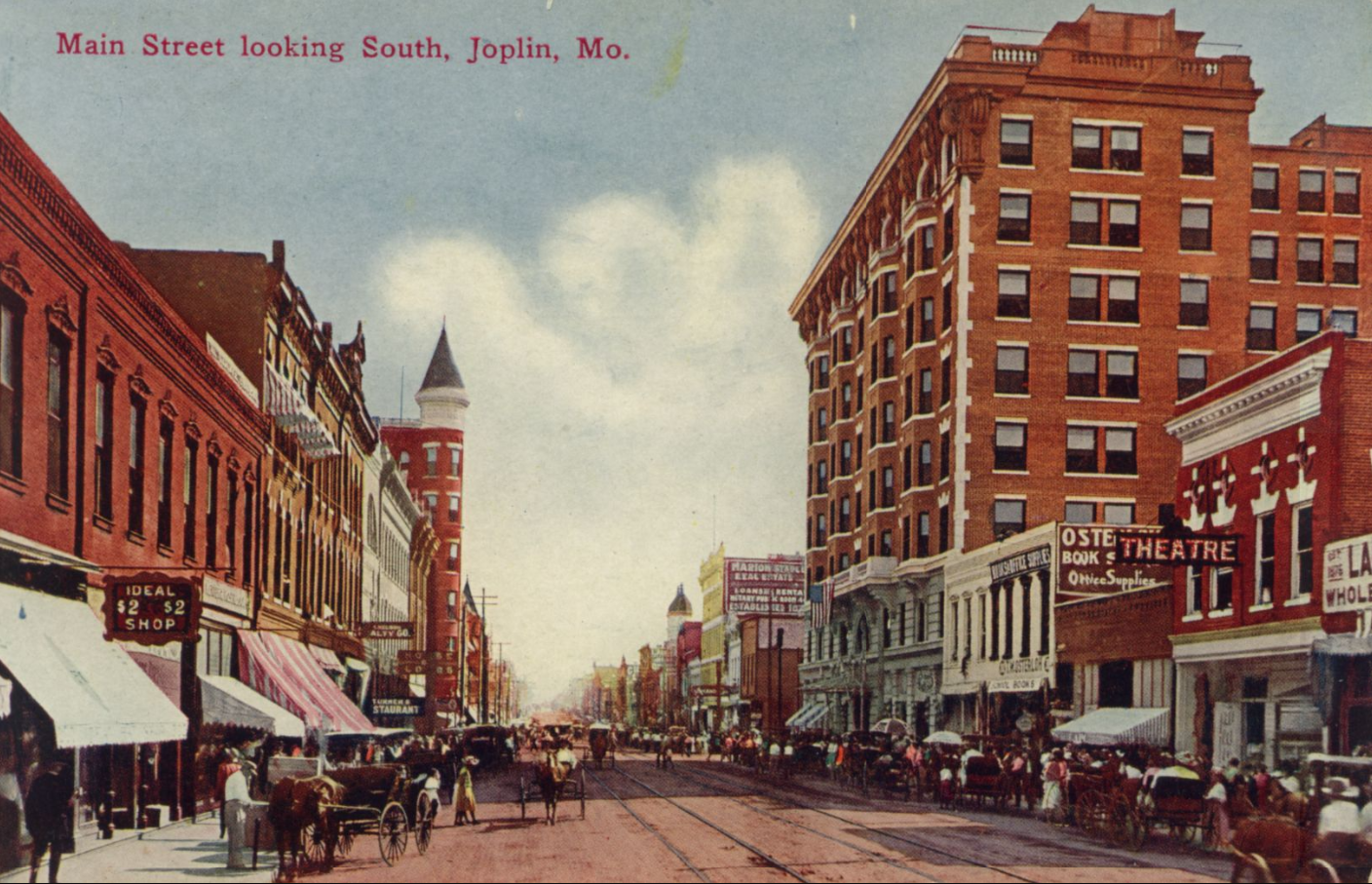
Main Street of Joplin, Missouri, at the time a leading center of Zinc and Lead mines

After the war, Yale became a teacher in public schools and moved to Barton County, Missouri, where he would stay for 21 years. He was at one time the teacher of merchant Robinson, of the Commerce Mining and Royalty Company. He then moved to Joplin, Missouri. During this time, he became the county surveyor, engaged in public affairs, and was elected to the Joplin City Council. On August 3, 1868, he married Zarilda A. Tabler. He later married Rachel A. Mann on July 4, 1876.

In 1893, for the World's Fair in Chicago, he was made a board member and chairman of the Missouri World's Fair Commission by Governor William J. Stone, later U.S. Senator. Other board members included Congressman Nathan Frank, Congressman William Dawson and William H. Gentry. In 1895, he was elected Chancellor of the Order of Samaritans of Joplin. He became Chairman of Jasper County under the Democrats from 1897 to 1898. For many years he was a member of Joplin Commercial Club. He was made its Secretary, eventually becoming president, and grew the membership to 300 businessmen.

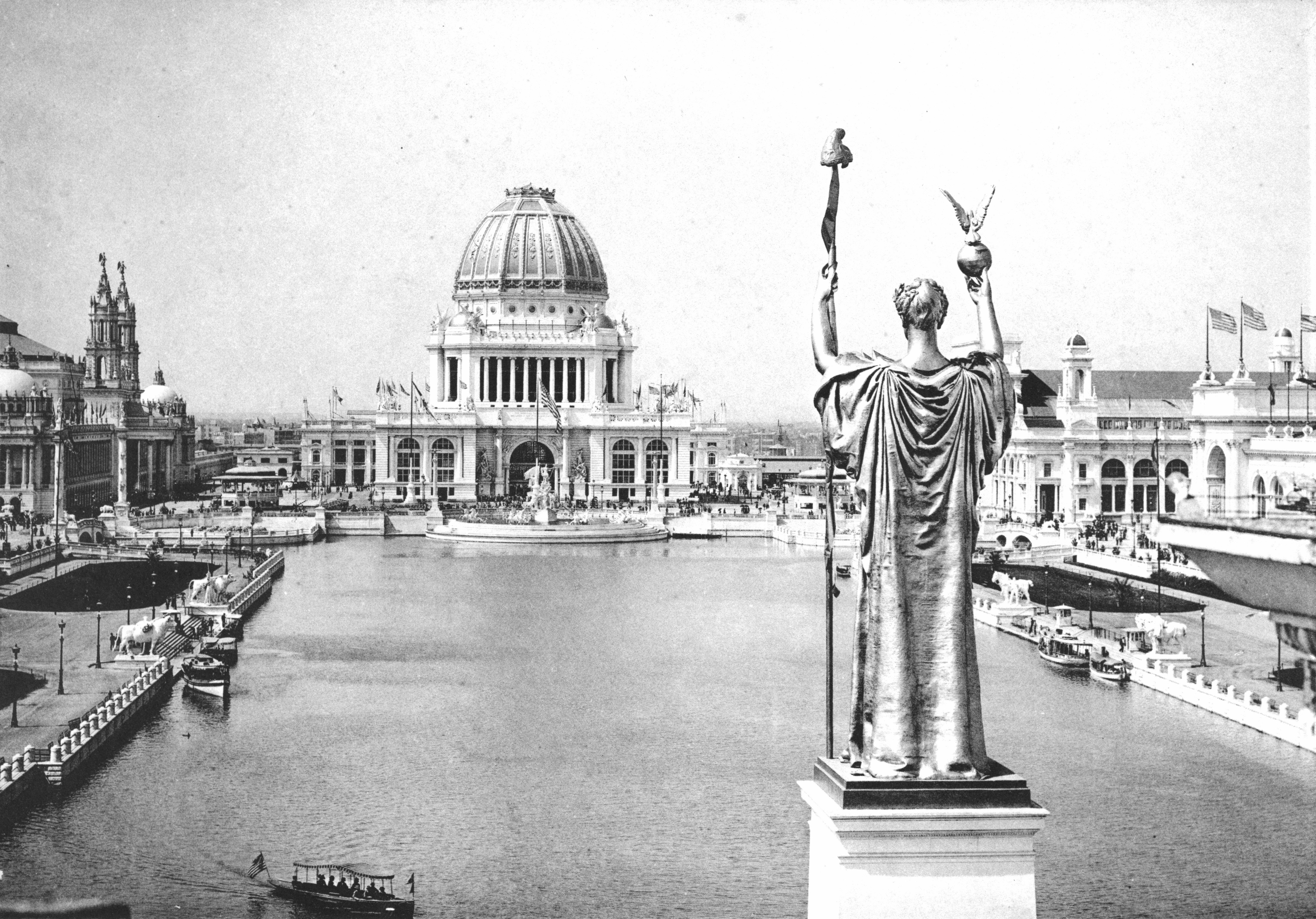
World's Fair in Chicago, 1893, Yale was Chairman of the Missouri World's Fair Commission by Governor William J. Stone

He then became a Colonel and acquired shares in the Nevada Capitol Gold Mining Company, becoming one of the first and largest shareholders. They stroke gold and the company had a capital stock of 2 million dollars in 1907, with mining engineer Capt. R. G. Dill as the company Secretary-Treasurer.

In 1907, Yale, now a mine operator and broker, cofounded the Joplin Stock Exchange, and was made a board director and its first Vice President. Other board directors included Senator John M. Malang, Colonel H. H. Gregg, John A. Cragin, president of the First National Bank, T. W. Cunningham, president of Cunningham National Bank, S. A. Stuckley, president of Carthage National Bank, and a few others.

The exchange had a limit of 200 seats, and was organized by the district's leading bankers, mine owners, manufacturers, jobbers and brokers. It was created to protect the Zinc and Lead district of Southwest Missouri, which produced 15 million dollars in sales annually in 1908. It had also members from Chicago, New York, Boston and other East Coast cities. Representatives of the St. Louis Stock Exchange and the New York Stock Exchange attended the opening as well as the Secretary of State of Missouri, John E. Swanger at the Beaux-Arts Connor Hotel.

== Later life ==
Yale became involved in mining, insurance and real estate. In 1911, the railroad station of Joplin was opened and named Joplin Union Depot. For the inauguration, ex-Governor David R. Francis made a speech representing the railroads, while Mayor Osborne addressed the crowd representing the city and Yale representing the Commercial Club.

He attended in the same year the banquet of the Federated States Societies in Los Angeles, with Charles W. Fairbanks, past vice-president of the United States, and Samuel Rinnah Van Sant, past Governor of Minnesota, as speakers. In 1914, he proposed with other businessmen the construction of an electric railroad connecting Joplin to Miami, Oklahoma, with the hope of capitalizing on the rich surrounding mineral fields of Zinc and Lead.

He then spent time raising funds for a railroad connecting Baxter Springs, Kansas to the Oklahoma line, and was elected to lead the committee with Mr. Snyder. In 1915, he received the officials of the Missouri–Kansas–Texas Railroad at the club, with Joplin's mayor and 50 local businessmen. In 1921, he joined the real estate firm Yale & Barnhill, and in 1924 he is recorded as Secretary of the Elks, Freemasons of Joplin, noticing bond holders of the Joplin Elks Building.

Yale died on July 25, 1930, in Webb City, Missouri. With his first wife, he had three daughters, and with his second wife, he had two daughters and one son named Walser O. Yale. He became the grain agent of the Burlington Railroad in Nebraska and Chief Freight clerk.
