= Wellington Smith =

Paper manufacturer (b. 1841, d. 1910)

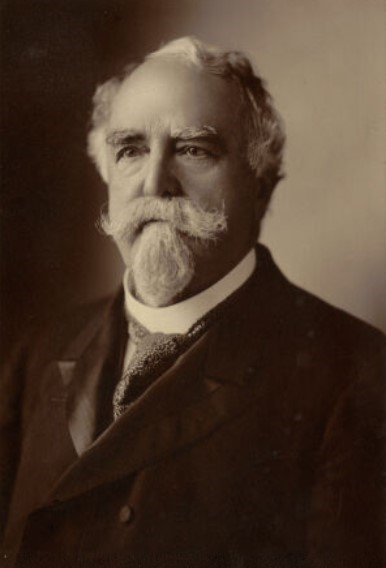
Portrait of Wellington Smith, paper manufacturer

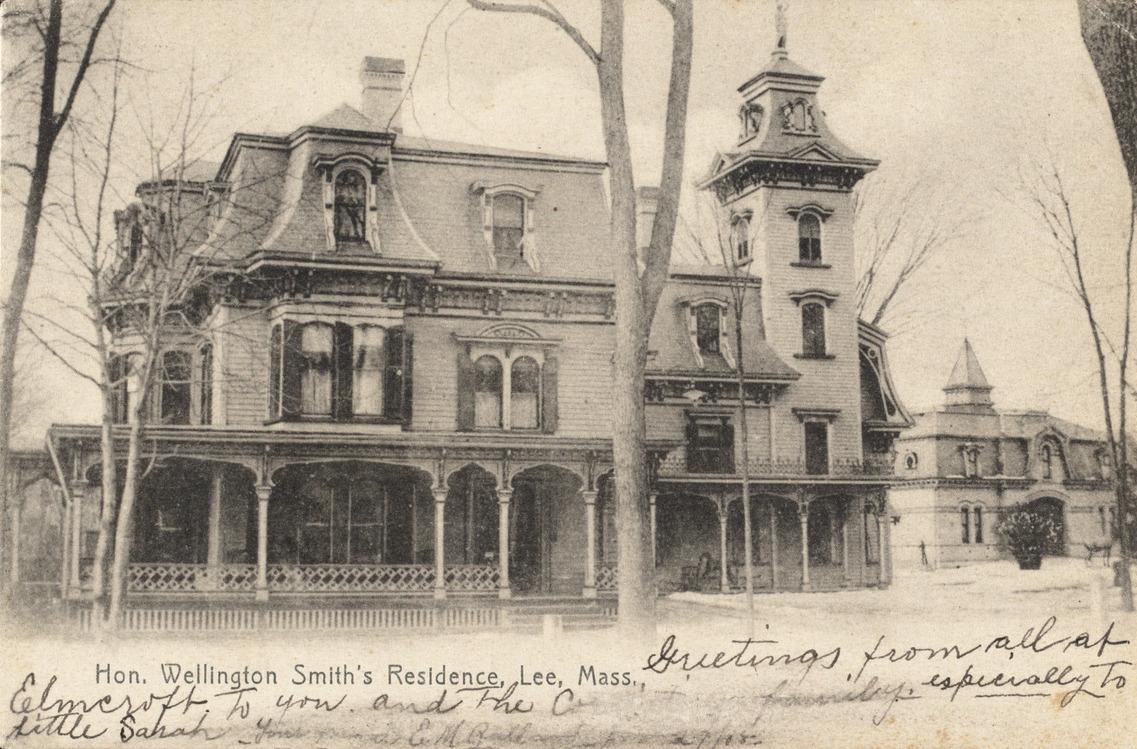
Residence of Wellington Smith in Lee, Massachusetts, built in 1830 in the French Second Empire style

Wellington Smith (1841 – 1910) was a pioneer American paper manufacturer from Lee, Massachusetts. He was the cofounder of the Smith Paper Company with his uncle, Senator Elizur Smith, and became the largest paper manufacturer in the United States. He was made president of the American Paper Makers Association, leading with Senator Warner Miller, and became a millionaire within his lifetime.

He was the first to produce paper made entirely of wood pulps, which launched a new industry in the country, and lowered the cost of newspapers such as the New York Herald. He was also a personal friend of President William McKinley, and an intimate of Abraham Lincoln.

== Early life ==
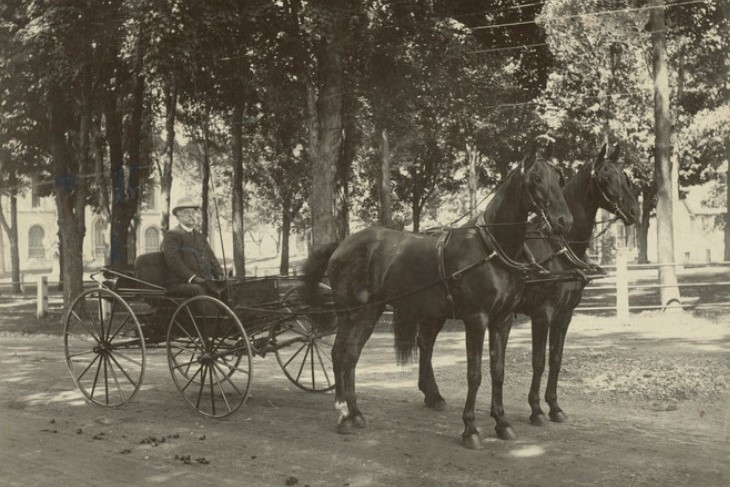
Smith in a carriage in Massachusetts

Wellington Smith was born on December 15, 1841, to John Randolph Smith and Parthenia Caroline Yale, members of the Yale family. His great-grandfather was Capt. Josiah Yale, a pioneer of Lee, Massachusetts, and veteran of the American War of Independence.

Smith was named by his uncle, Senator Elizur Smith, in honor of the Duke of Wellington, and was a descendant of pilgrim Stephen Hopkins. His father was a paper manufacturer, in business with Senator Elizur Smith, his brother, and telegraph entrepreneur Cyrus W. Field, who founded the Atlantic Telegraph Company. The venture was in Russell, Massachusetts, under the name of John R. Smith & Company.

Smith was a cousin of Rev. Theodore Yale Gardner, and of the Mayor of Cleveland, George W. Gardner, one of the first business partners of John D. Rockefeller, patriarch of the Rockefeller family. His uncle was Charles Lester Yale, associate director of St. Paul Pioneer Press, founded by James M. Goodhue, and his granduncle was Rev. Elisha Yale of New York, who graduated from Yale. He was also a cousin of Rev. Cyrus Yale, Mary Yale Pitkin, wife of architect Charles Eliot, and of Yale martyr Horace Tracy Pitkin.

Smith went to public schools during his youth, and was educated by Deacon Alexander Hyde. At 15, he became a clerk in the store of Smith & Bosworth, and at 16, became the general manager of the D. C. Hull & Sons store. At 18 years old, he started a business with H. S. Hubert with a store and a watermill. He then went to New York and became a salesman in the silk industry, becoming eventually a partner in the New York store.

== Biography ==
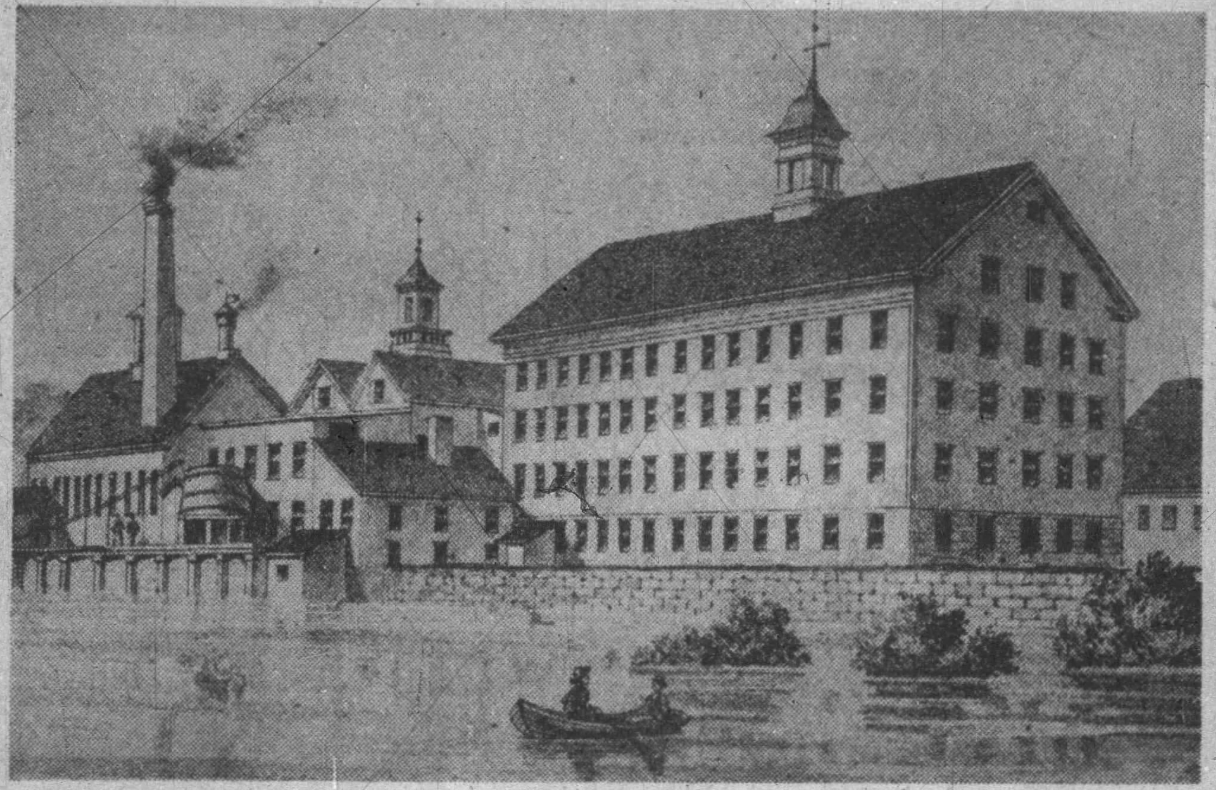
Eagle Mill of the Smith Paper Company, Wellington Smith and Senator Elizur Smith's company

In 1865, Smith was associated with his cousin DeWitt Smith, and uncle Senator Elizur Smith, forming the Smith Paper Company. His uncle was at the time one of the largest paper manufacturer in America, and the leading manufacturer in Massachusetts. Smith would become the company's treasurer for over 40 years. The economic opportunity came after the American Civil War, which had caused a shortage of paper across the nation. Inventor Pagenstecher, a German railroad engineer and associate of Theodore Steinway, head of Steinway & Sons, had come to Wellington Smith in Berkshire, convincing him of the benefits of his woodpulp paper process invention.

During this period, Smith was the active head of the Smith Paper Company, and opened a factory in Berkshire for them, at a cost of $11,000, and used the cheap and abundant water power available there for this new production process. Smith's competitors laughed at the idea at first, and thought the company would go bankrupt producing this type of paper. The experiment proved successful, despite not being of the highest quality, which would change over the years as they improved the underlying technology. A unique property of this paper was its ability to absorb ink instantly.

Paper manufactured of these wood pulps was first produced in America by the Smith Paper Co. in 1865. It would become the first wood pulp based paper in the world, which lowered the cost of manufacturing paper, and worked in synergy with the growing newspaper industry, which needed low prices and high volume to sustain their new business model based on advertising rather than subscriptions.

They then added mills such as the Pleasant Valley Mill, and increased their production capacity. With this mill, they produced about fifty tons of paper per week. They would then produce 60 tons of paper per week, and later on, over 165 tons a week. They had as customers the New York Herald and other newspapers, with clients all over the country. They once received an order of 1,000 tons by James Gordon Bennett Jr., owner of the Herald. Around 1875, they acquired the plant of the Lenox Plate Company from Gov. Theodore Roosevelt of New York.

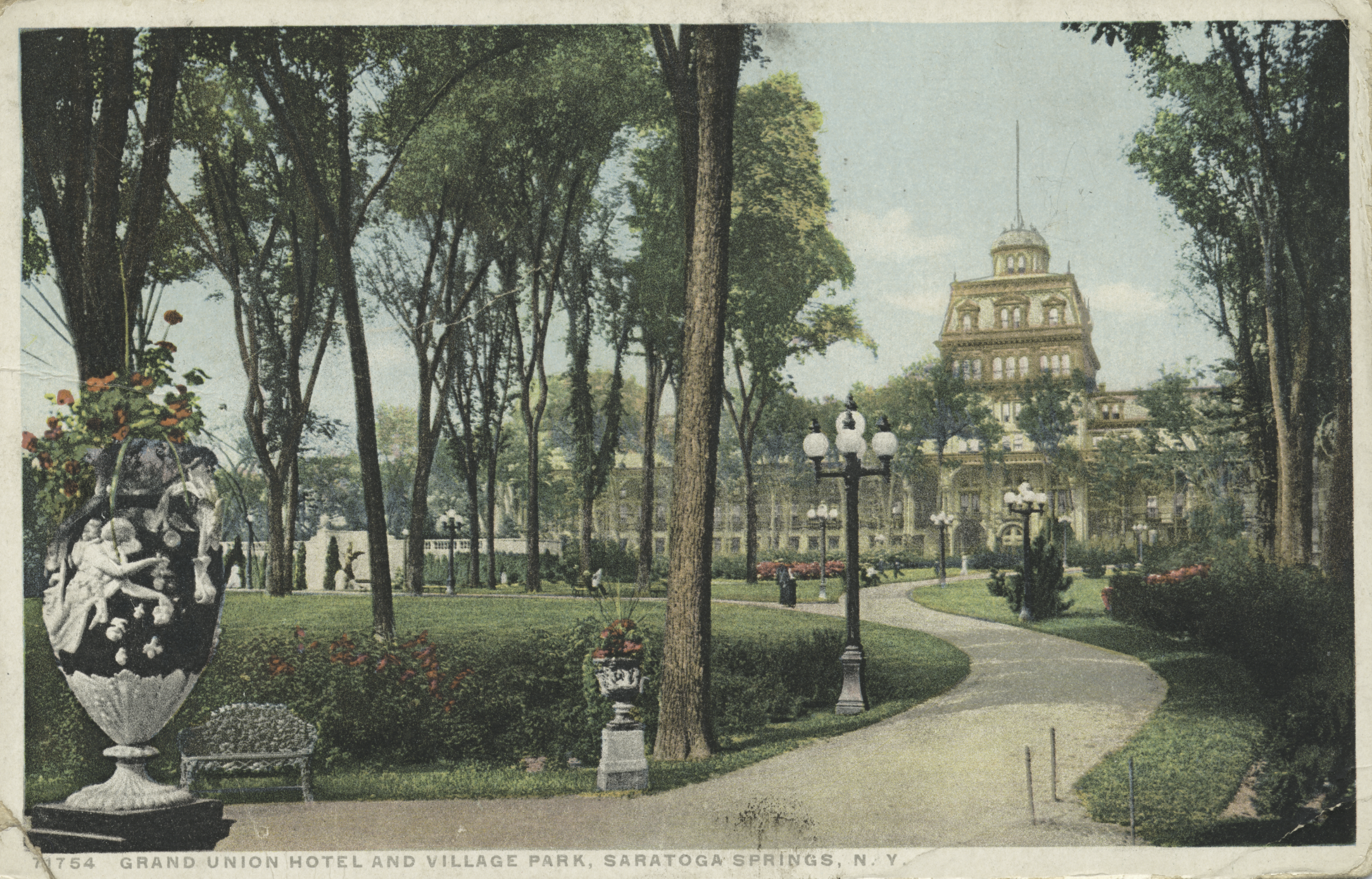
The Grand Union Hotel in New York, meeting of the American Paper Makers Association

In 1878, Smith became the first founding vice-president of the American Paper Makers Association, and later presided the association. In 1880, during the reunion of the American Paper Makers Association at the Grand Union Hotel, New York, Smith became its chairman, replacing Congressman William Whiting II. He then became the head of the American paper making industry, which was the largest in the world at the time.

Over time, the Smith Paper Company focused exclusively on producing newsprints, books and manila papers under their new process, and as a result, became the largest paper manufacturer in the United States, and later, in the world. They began manufacturing tissue, lightweight paper, carbon, opaque Bible and cigarette paper, and would later be acquired under Smith's sons by the British American Tobacco Co. of James Buchanan Duke, benefactor and namesake of Duke University. They were also the first paper manufacturer to use American flax fibre in the production of cigarette paper.

== Later life ==
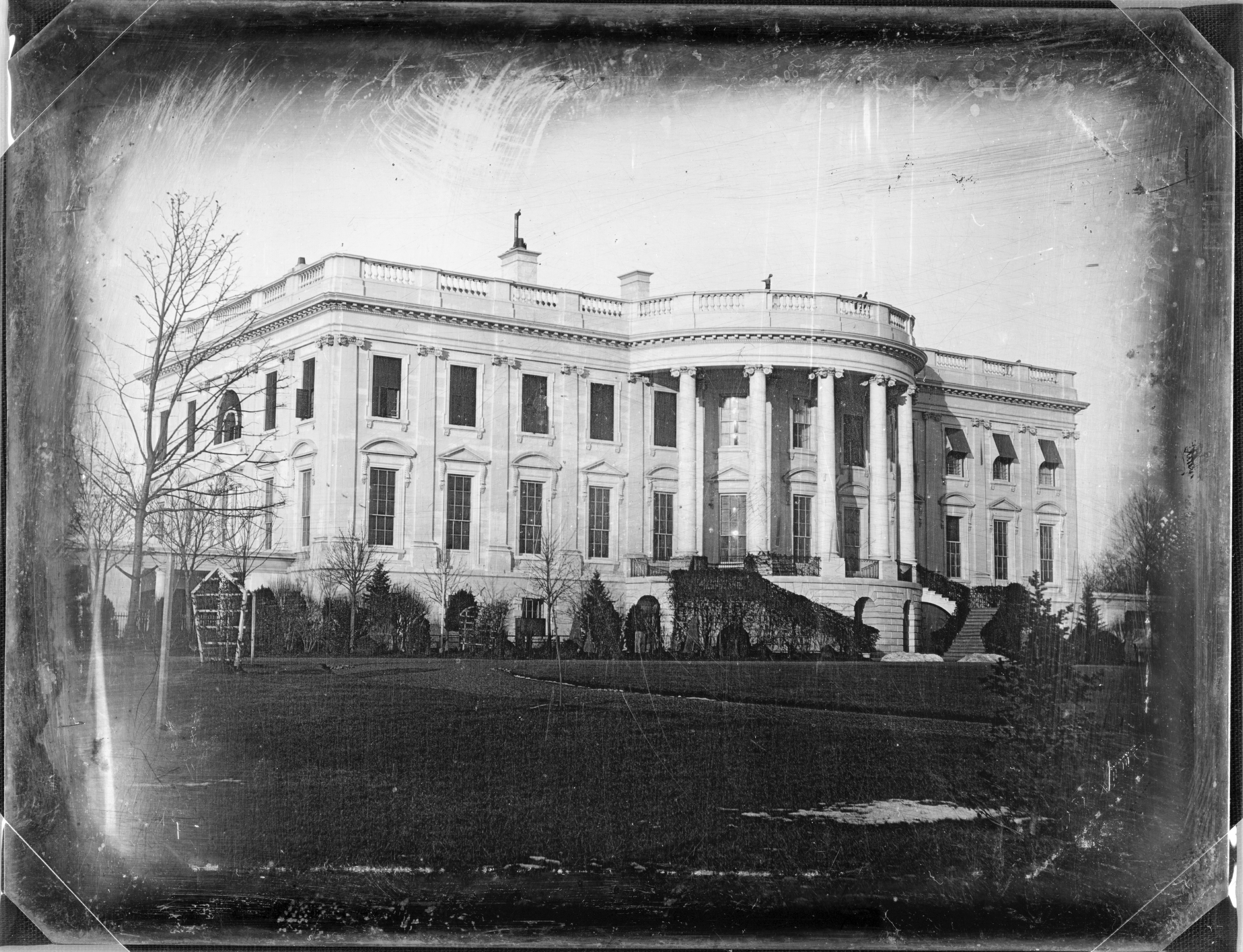
The White House in Washington, Abraham Lincoln's residence, where Smith met him several times

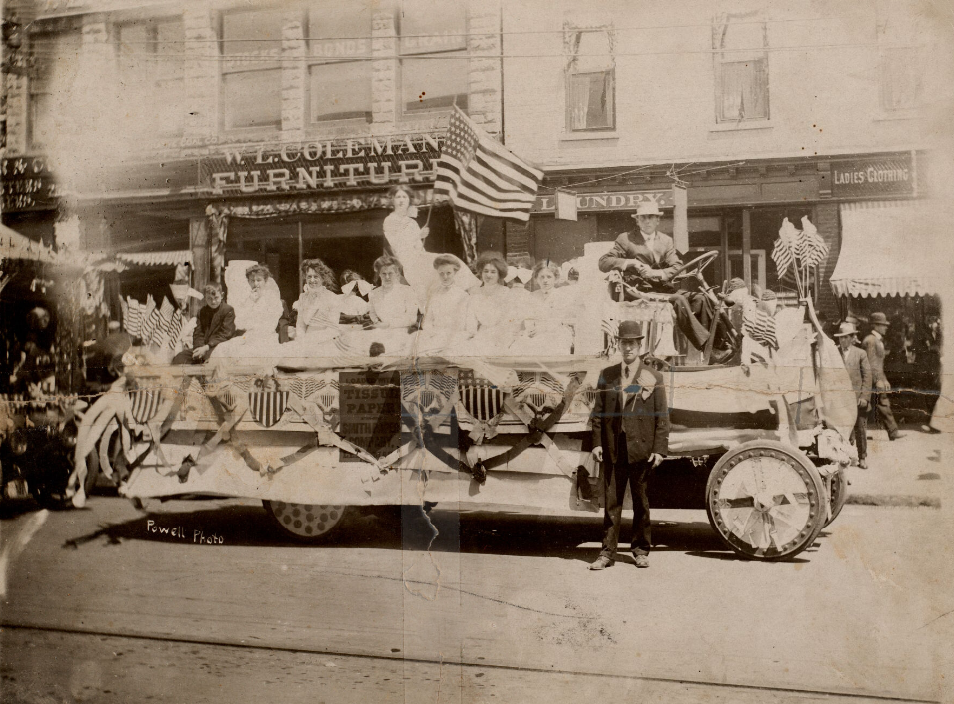
Smith Paper Company Parade in 1900

Smith was a delegate to the Chicago Republican National Convention in 1880, when they nominated James A. Garfield for president. He was also a member of General Benjamin Butler's council when he was the Governor of Massachusetts in 1883. In 1882, Smith was elected on the executive council for the 8th district of Berkshire, and became treasurer and trustee of the Berkshire Gold and Silver Mining Company. He represented the paper manufacturers of the United States before the Congressional tariff commission in Chicago. In 1882, Smith became president of the Ancient and Honorable Berkshire Agricultural Society, and received Governor John Davis Long, later Secretary of the Navy, and Gov. George D. Robinson, at the time Congressman.

Smith became one of the first presidents of the American Paper Manufacturers Association, now the American Forest & Paper Association, and the first president of the Berkshire County Chapter of the Sons of the American Revolution. He stayed engaged in the paper manufacturing industry for over 40 years. In 1886, Smith cofounded with his uncle and cousin, the Pleasant Valley Water Company, to provide water to the residents of Lee and Lenox, Massachusetts, and thereafter, held certain water rights for the Smith Paper Company.

Smith was a personal friend of the presidents of the United States William McKinley and Abraham Lincoln, whom he knew intimately and visited several times at the White House in Washington, D.C. When a young man, he was with Lincoln at his residence, and saw the president refuse the request of a young woman asking for her brother, a Confederate, to be released from jail. After listening to her request, Lincoln then said : "He's been in pretty bad company, I think we had better let him stay where he is for a while".

The young woman then insisted on her story, to which Lincoln replied : "How do I know your story is true. Many a better looking woman than you has fooled me". Smith also recalled an event with Senator Taylor reaching to Lincoln, telling him he seeks no office and wants no favors, to which Lincoln then replied : "Show this man in... A man who does not want anything". Smith would stay involved in politics with the Republicans, and every Governor of Massachusetts would be received at his home in Lee, Massachusetts.

In 1895, Smith was at a convention of the Republicans with Congressman Hendrick B. Wright, to nominate Charles W. Fuller as sheriff. Smith was a member of the Home Market Club of Boston, cofounded by Gov. Eben Sumner Draper, president of the Greylock Mills Company of Adams, president of the Boston Paper Trade Association, board director of the Berkshire Life Insurance Company, president of the Derby Mills Paper Company, member of the Evening Star lodge of the Freemasons of Lee, and a member of the town's Congregational Church. Smith was also the leading figure, with US Senator Warner Miller, of the national paper manufacturers association. By 1943, the annual wood pulp production in North America would bring about half a billion dollars in sales for the industry, with 13 million tons of paper produced per year.

== Death ==
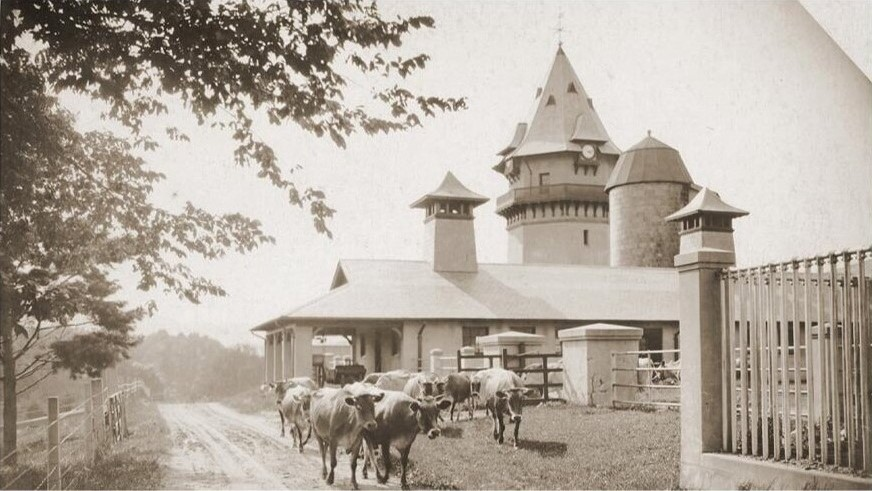
Highlawn horse racing estate in Lee, Massachusetts, Senator Elizur Smith's estate, 1923, sold to the Vanderbilt family

In 1889, Smith inherited the Highlawn horse-racing estate of his uncle, Senator Elizur Smith, and sold his famous Alcantara stallion for $60,000, the highest price ever paid for a horse at the time. Smith later sold the Highlawn estate to William Douglas Sloane and Emily Thorn Vanderbilt, on which they would build "Elm Court", and to George Westinghouse, the rival of Thomas Edison, who would build "Erskine Park" on the estate.

Smith died on April 26, 1910, after an accident, and was recorded a millionaire at his death. Their New York office was at 18 Beekman Street, Manhattan, close to the Temple Court Building. He was married to Mary Clark Shannon on June 19, 1861, at the beginning of the American Civil War. He had five children with his two wives; Augustus and Mary by his first, and Wellington Jr., Etta and Elizur Yale Smith by his second wife, Anne Maria Bullard.

His son, Augustus, became president of the Smith Paper Co., which he sold in 1917 to British American Tobacco of the Duke family of Duke University, and his daughter, Marry Smith, became a graduate from Stanford University. His son, Elizur Yale Smith, married the daughter of Col. Clermont Livingston Best, Annie Livingston Tooker Best of Mrs. Astor's Four Hundred, who was a relative of Gabriel M. Tooker and Charlotte Tooker, of the Goelet and Vanderbilt families. The couple were also friends of the Vanderbilts, including Alfred G. Vanderbilt of The Breakers, Newport, who gave them presents at their wedding.
