= Elizur Yale Smith =

Paper manufacturer and socialite from New York

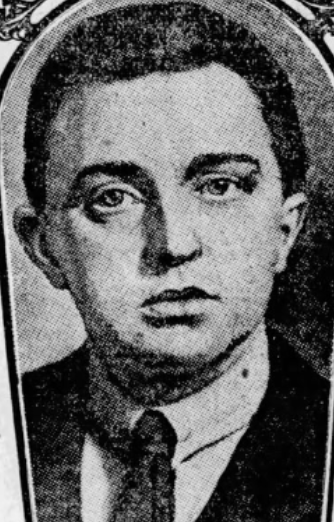
Portrait of Elizur Yale Smith in the Chicago Examiner, 1911, when arrested for non payments at a hotel

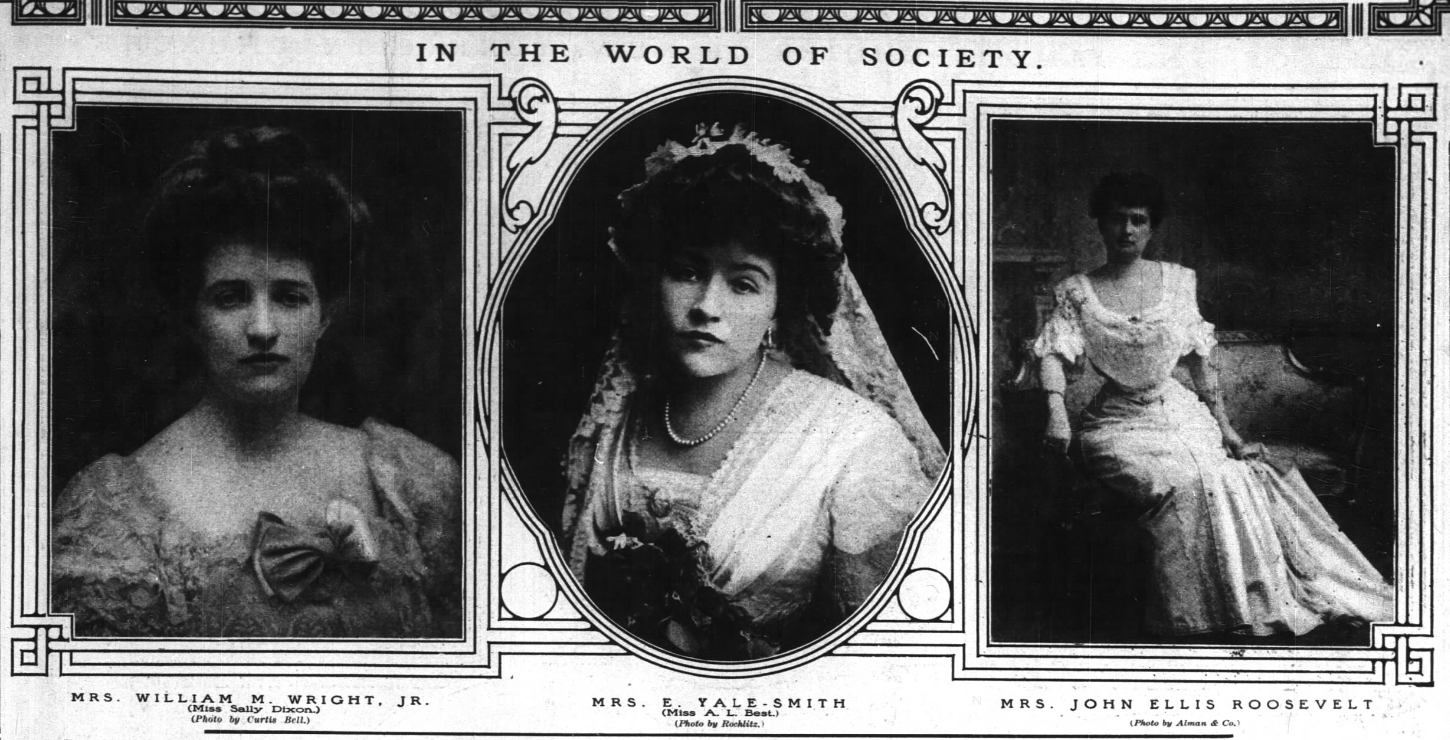
Society weddings, Mrs. Gen. William M. Wright, Mrs. Elizur Yale Smith, and Mrs. John Ellis Roosevelt

Major Elizur Yale Smith (1885 – 1950) was an American paper manufacturer, military officer, socialite, author and historian from New York. He served in the American Legion of the Canadian Expeditionary Force during World War I, and became executive secretary of the Federal Hall in Manhattan, which he helped save with a consortium. He was prominent in Newport society during the late Gilded Age, along with his wife, Mrs. Annie Livingston Best, daughter of Col. Clermont L. Best. He was also one of the heirs of his father, millionaire Wellington Smith, and a friend of the Vanderbilts and Roosevelts in New York.

== Early life ==
Elizur Yale Smith was born on May 7, 1885, in Lee, Massachusetts, to Anne Maria Bullard and Wellington Smith, members of the Yale family. His father was the son of Parthenia Caroline Yale, granddaughter of Capt. Josiah Yale of the American War of Independence, and was a cousin of Rev. Theodore Yale Gardner and Cleveland mayor George W. Gardner, who made his fortune as a commodity dealer with the young John D. Rockefeller. His great-granduncle was Rev. Cyrus Yale, who was involved in the temperance movement with Stephen Van Rensselaer, member of the Dutch Van Rensselaer family.

His father, Wellington Smith, was the largest paper manufacturer in the United States, coproprietor of the Smith Paper Company with Elizur's granduncle, Senator Elizur Smith, and died a millionaire in 1910. Elizur's father was also involved in politics, and was a personal friend of President William McKinley, and knew intimately Abraham Lincoln, whom he visited several times at his residence at the White House.

Before his father's death, Wellington had sold the 700 acres family equestrian estate in Lee, Massachusetts, to George Westinghouse, the competitor of Thomas Edison, and to William D. Sloane and Emily Thorn Vanderbilt, on which they would build Elm Court.

== Biography ==
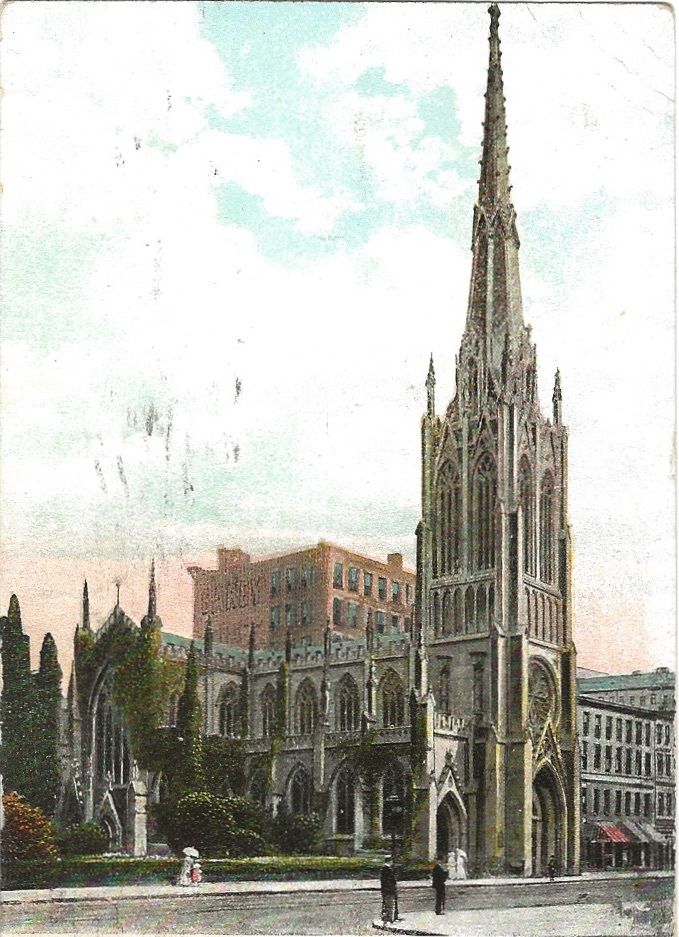
Grace Church, New York, in 1908

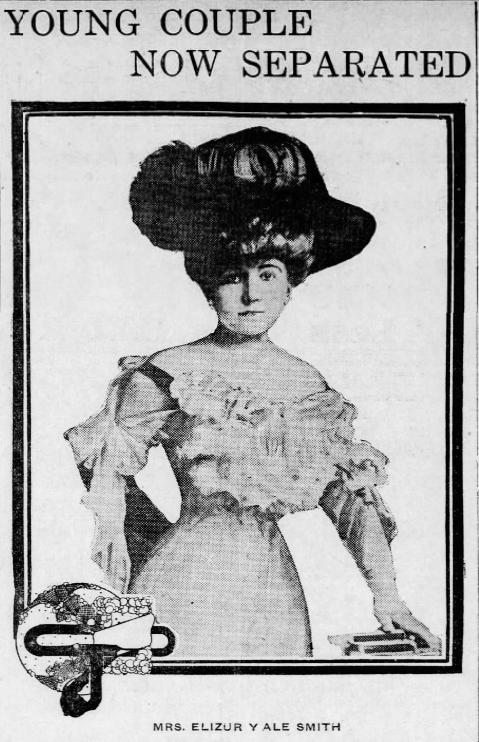
Mrs. Elizur Yale Smith, separation

Smith attended a private school in Boston, and then enrolled at Williams College, Massachusetts, in 1907. He thereafter left Williams before graduation to attend Columbia University. He studied in early American history and genealogy, with added interest on New York and New England. He would become eventually an antiquarian and historian of the Bill of Rights Commemorative Society.

He then joined for four or five years the 7th Regiment of the National Guards of New York. He later joined the 15th Canadian Light Horse of the Canadian Militia, and became a clerk for the Supreme Court Chambers of Alberta and Calgary. Smith worked at the Smith Paper Company for his father, with their headquarters at 18 Beekman Street, Manhattan, close to the Temple Court Building. Smith became a paper manufacturer and was made the Western manager of the company, while his brother, Augustus Smith, became its vice-president, and later, assumed the presidency. They would grow the enterprise in various fields, including the manufacturing of cigarette paper.

In 1907, Yale Smith married to Annie Livingston Best on November 6, at Grace Church, Manhattan, who was the daughter of Col. Clermont Livingston Best, and a descendant of the Livingston family. Her uncle was Gabriel Mead Tooker, and her cousin was Mrs. Tooker Whitney Warren, wife of the architect of Grand Central Terminal of the Vanderbilts. They were all members of Mrs. Astor's Four Hundred during the Gilded Age.

Smith's best man at the wedding was Dr. Smith Hollins McKim, husband of millionaire Margaret Emerson, who later remarried to Alfred Gwynne Vanderbilt, and became the mother of Alfred Gwynne Vanderbilt Jr. His groomsmen included painter Ben Ali Haggin, grandson of millionaire James Ben Ali Haggin, and Frank J. Gould, husband of Princess Vlora of Albania, and son of robber baron Jay Gould. Gould's brother built Hempstead House on Long Island. On their wedding day, they were also showered with presents by Mrs. and Mr. Alfred G. Vanderbilt of The Breakers, nephew of George Washington Vanderbilt II of the Biltmore Estate.

Mrs. Best was a protegee of Mrs. Astor and Mrs. Stuyvesant Fish. Gladys Vanderbilt of the Breakers, and Countess Beroldingen, came at her debutante party in New York, and was personally invited to Mrs. Astor gala at the Beechwood Estate. Mrs. Best was also announced to society by Mrs. Astor's son, John Jacob Astor IV, who later perished on the Titanic, and was a member of The Four Hundred during the Gilded Age, along with her cousin Charlotte Tooker Warren. In 1907, the couple occupied, with Mrs. Clermont Livingston Best and Mrs. Eva Lincoln, the opera box at the Hudson Theatre, to see Brewster's Millions on Broadway.

== Social life ==
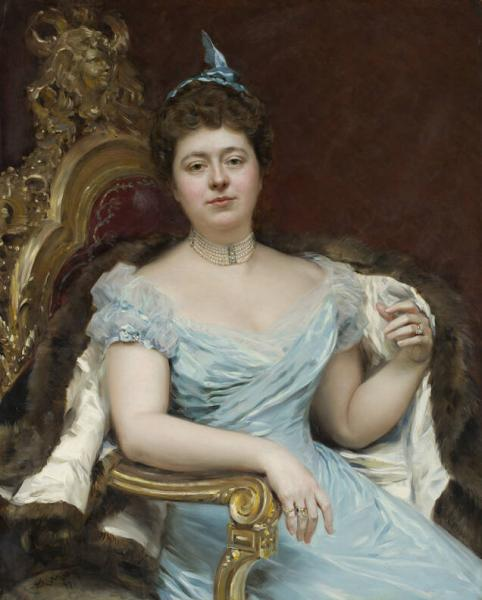
Mrs. Edward Lyman Short, born Anna Livingston Petit, cousin of Mrs. Yale Smith, and her maid of honor

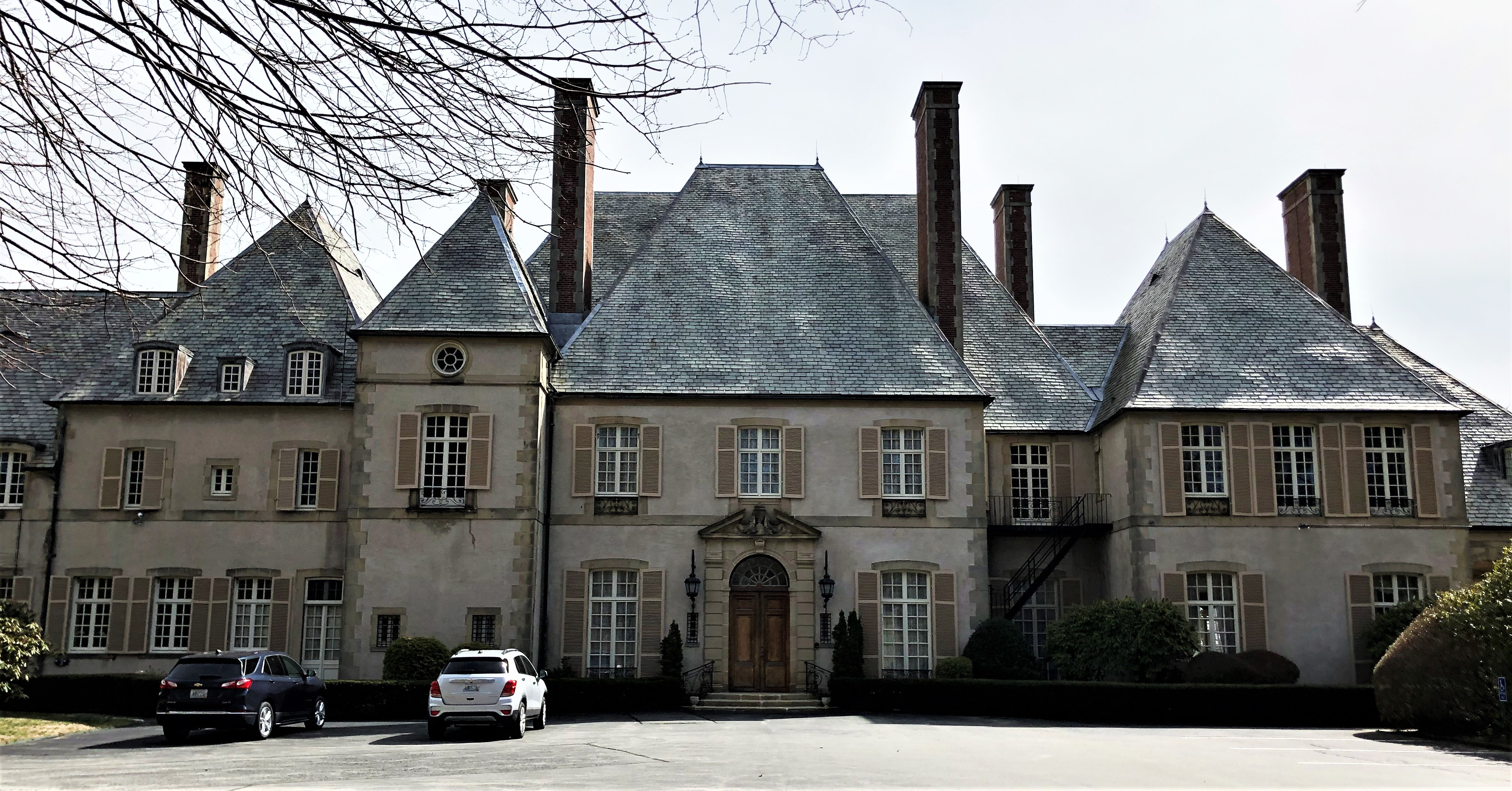
Glen Manor of Mrs. Henry A. C. Taylor, nicknamed "Empress Josephine", in Newport, Rhode Island

The Yale-Smith couple attended, with Mrs. J. Ellis Roosevelt, the wedding of Florence Bourne, daughter Frederick Gilbert Bourne, the proprietor of the Singer Building. They then attended the wedding reception at Newport of Mrs. Best's cousin, Charlotte L. Warren, daughter of Whitney Warren. Guests included Mrs. Taylor of Glen House Manor, nicknamed Empress Josephine, Ogden Mills of Livingston Manor, Countess Gladys Vanderbilt of The Breakers, cousin of Duchess Consuelo Vanderbilt of Blenheim Palace, the Goelets of Ochre Court, and a few others. They were also at her cousin's New York reception at 1040 Fifth Avenue, along with Mrs. John Jacob Astor IV, Mrs. Alfred Wagstaff Jr., Mrs. Cornelius Vanderbilt III, and other socialites.

Smith's wife was involved in various activities at Newport, Rhode Island, with the daughters of C. P. H. Gilbert, architect for the Warburgs of Warburg House, and for Otto Hermann Kahn of Oheka Castle. They were invited at the debutante reception of Mrs. John Ellis Roosevelt at her new home at 818 Madison Avenue, to introduce their daughter Gladys Roosevelt to society. Her husband was a cousin of President Theodore Roosevelt, being the son of Robert Roosevelt, Teddy's uncle. They attended the reception with Emlen Roosevelt, Mrs. Frederic René Coudert Sr., aunt of Mrs. Condé Nast, and others.

Despite being from wealthy families, the couple were not given large sums of money after their marriage. Elizur's father, Wellington Smith, was an old-fashioned New Englander who thought that sons should first make their own way in life before having a share in the family wealth. As a result, Mrs. Best filed for divorce 6 months later, and Smith fled to Europe. Smith would inherit equally with his brothers a few years later when his father died in 1910.

After their divorce, Mrs. Best remarried to Arthur Carroll, son of Gen. Carroll of Carrollcliffe, and grandson of Congressman John H. Starin. Their wedding was attended by Baron Rudolph von Buddenbrock, grandson of Prussian General Friedrich von Buddenbrock of the Napoleonic Wars.

She remarried 10 years later to W. Sackett Duell, son of Associate Justice Charles H. Duel, brother of Senator Holland S. Duell, and grandson of Congressman R. Holland Duell. She remarried six months later to Lt. Charles Albert Smylie, whom she would also divorce. Her last husband was Vladimir Alexandrovitch Behr, Major in the old Moscow Grenadiers, and aide to the Grand Duke Alexander Mikhailovich of the House of Romanov.

== Later life ==
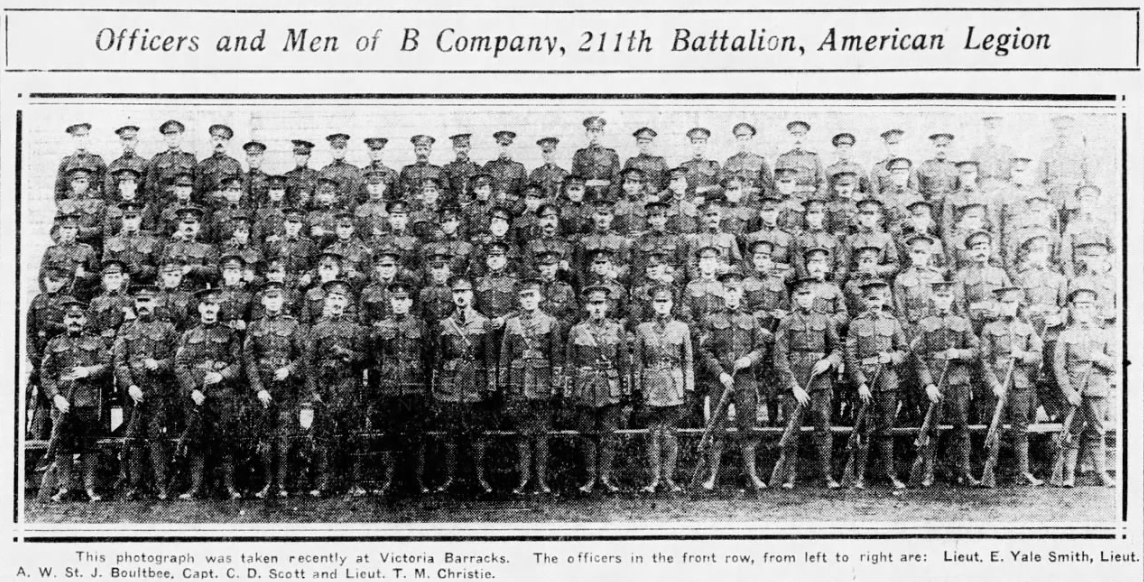
Elizur Yale Smith, as lieutenant in the 211th Battalion of the American Legion, 1916

Around 1910, Smith was placed on a hard bench in the Cook County Jail in Chicago, for having made worthless checks to The Blackstone Hotel. He had been previously accused of the same scheme in London a few years before at the Carlton Hotel. His checks were without funds at the time based on technicalities with the trust fund, as while being an heir of his father's fortune with his brothers, he had not yet inherited the full sum.

In 1916, during World War I, Smith became lieutenant in the American Legion of the Dominion of Canada, under Lt. Col. Sage, and later sailed for Europe. He was in charge of recruiting in Vancouver, and later for British Columbia. He graduated from the Royal School of Infantry, and was made instructor of musketry and bombing. In the same year, he served as lieutenant in the 211th Battalion of the American Legion of the Canadian Expeditionary Force.

In 1917, Elizur's brother, Augustus Smith, at the time president of the Smith Paper Co., would sell the family enterprise to the British American Tobacco Co. of James Buchanan Duke, benefactor and namesake of Duke University. In 1919, he became captain of the 50th Battalion of the Canadian Corps in France. He was wounded on the battlefield and would go to London, where he would be posted at the headquarters of the Canadian Forestry Corps.

In 1928, Smith married secondly to actress Ida Emeline Gore, a sister of Col. Edwin Bulkley Gore, who was general manager of the Delaware and Hudson Railway. Col. Gore served under Gen. Harry Hill Bandholtz, and was a guest of Gen. Highbee's medal award event, along with the Secretary of War of Franklin D. Roosevelt, the General Robert P. Patterson. He later remarried to Miss Violet Alley, and their daughter Doreen would be baptized at St George's Chapel of Windsor Castle, by Rev. Albert Baillie, the Dean of Windsor.

== Death ==
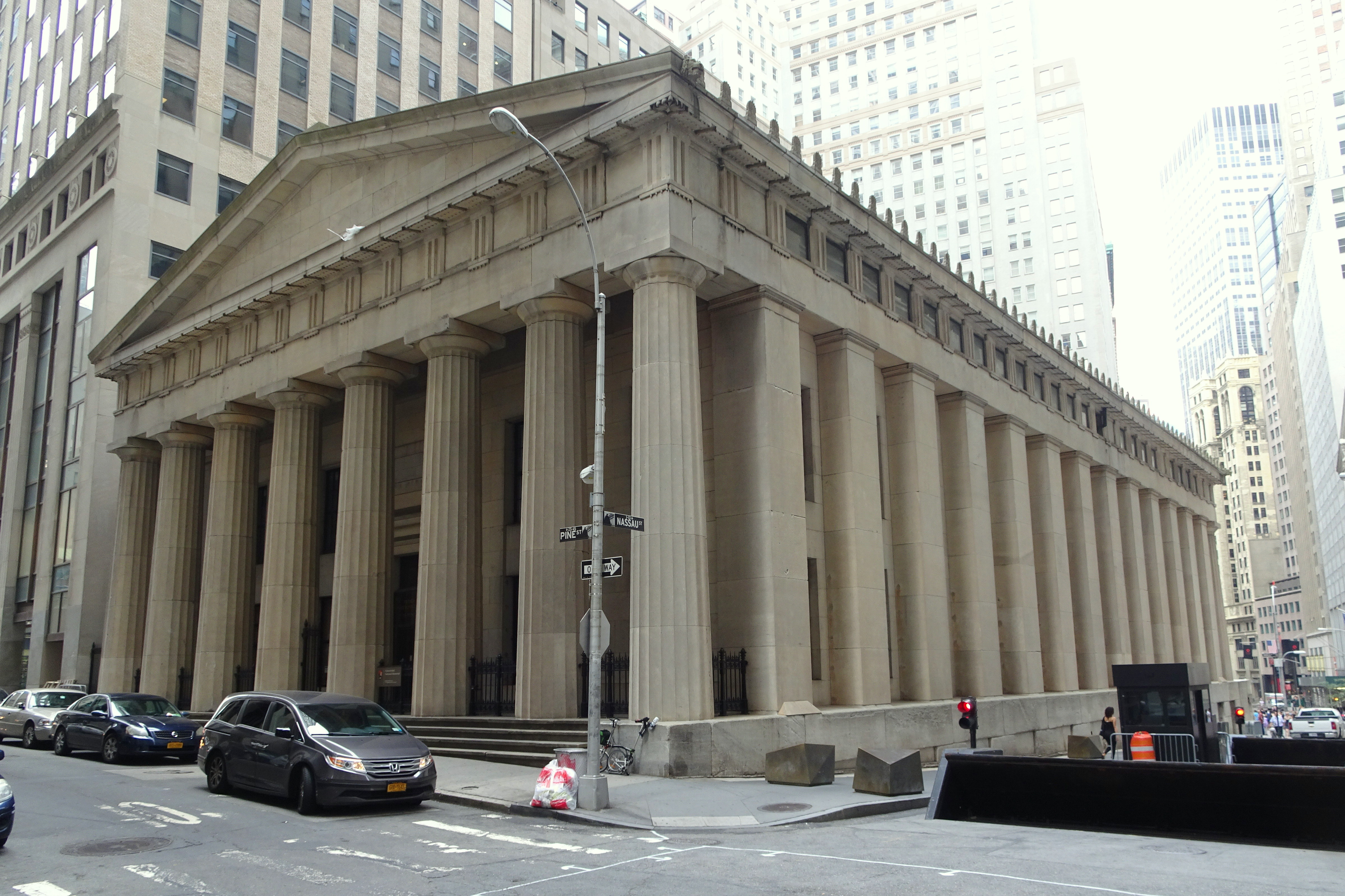
Federal Hall on Wall Street, Manhattan, old treasury building, was saved partly by Smith

Smith eventually became Major in the army, and executive secretary of the Bill of Rights Commemorative Society, as well as custodian of the Federal Hall National Memorial on Wall Street. He was also historian of the Federal Hall, and helped saved the monument and convert it into a museum. He was involved with various research projects on historic documents and collections regarding the history of the United States. One project involved Barney Balaban, president of Paramount Pictures, regarding documents relating to the United States Bill of Rights. He covered the history of the wood pulp industry with members of Congress, started by his father Wellington Smith, and granduncle Senator Elizur Smith, who founded the Smith Paper Company.

They were the first to successfully produce wood pulp based paper, with telegraph entrepreneur Cyrus W. Field. Among their first pioneer customers were James Gordon Bennett Jr., owner of the New York Herald, and Samuel Bowles, owner of the Springfield Republican. The Smiths then acquired from Theodore Roosevelt a paper mill in Massachusetts, and grew their production to eventually become the largest paper manufacturers in the country. Smith wrote on NYC's first mayor Capt. Thomas Willett, and commented on the works of Col. Albert J. Pickett, Alabama's first historian, relating to the erection of the Federal Hall, site of the 1st Congress of the United States by George Washington.

Elizur Yale Smith was stricken at the Commodore Hotel and died on January 12, 1950, in Manhattan, New York.
