= Elizur Smith =

Senator from Lee, Massachusetts

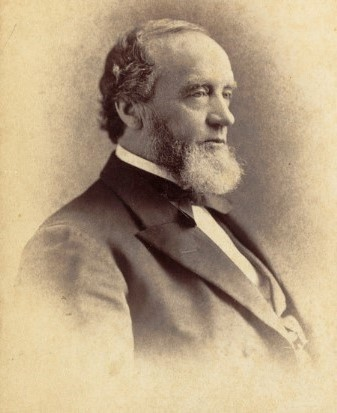
Senator Elizur Smith's portrait

Elizur Smith (1812 – 1889) was an American politician and paper manufacturer from Lee, Massachusetts. His enterprise, the Smith Paper Company, became the largest fine paper manufacturer in America. He also served in the Massachusetts House of Representatives and became a Senator from the southern Berkshire District in 1879. His breeding farm, named Highlawn, became one of the largest equestrian estate in the East Coast, and was later acquired by the Vanderbilts.

== Biography ==
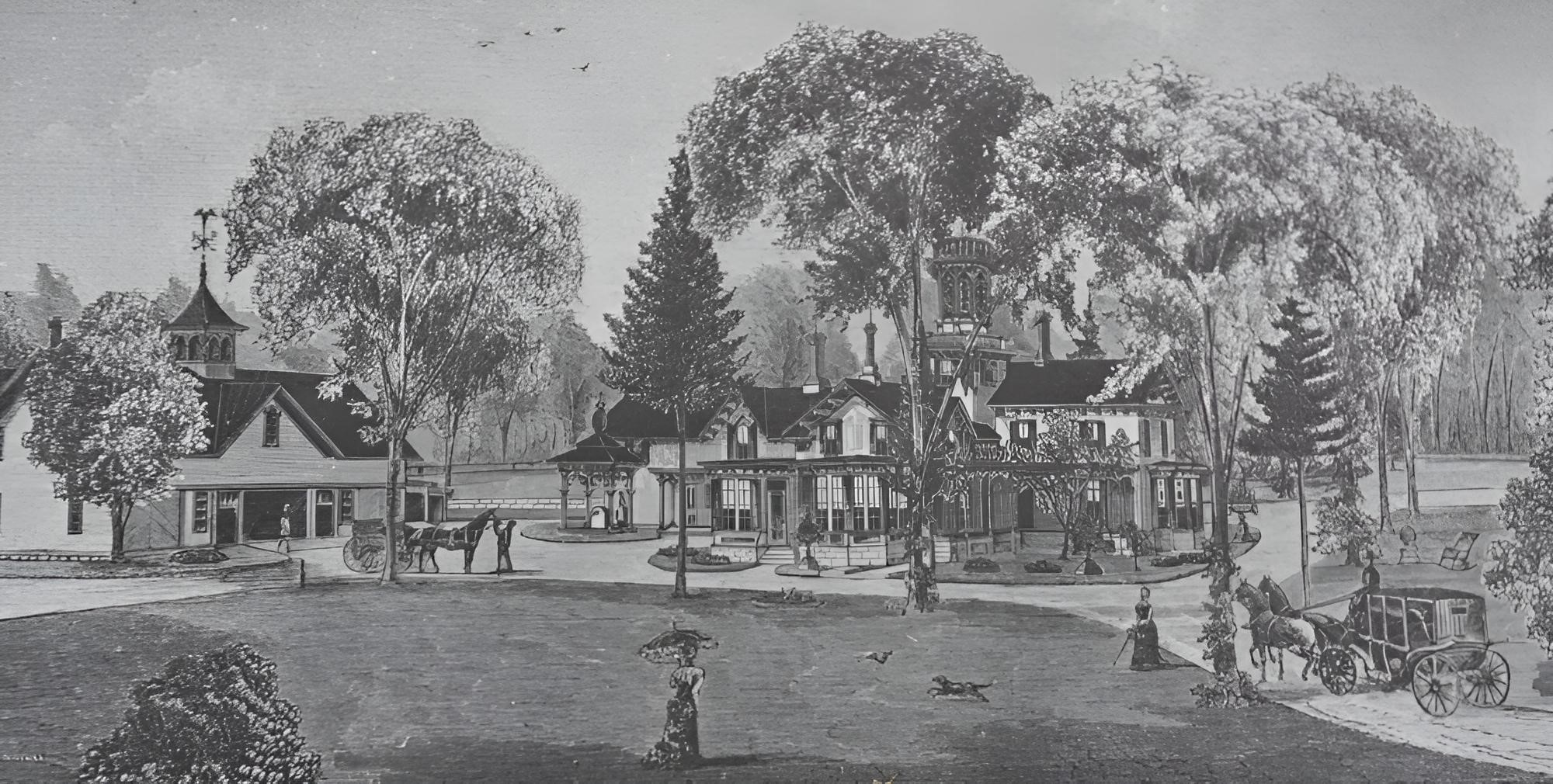
Senator Elizur Smith's 700 acres equestrian estate, built in 1850, was later acquired by William Douglas Sloane and Emily Thorn Vanderbilt

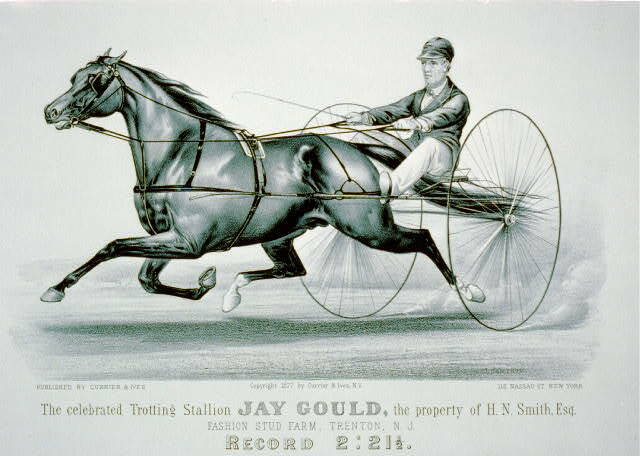
The Jay Gould, one of the trotting stallions competing against Smith's horses

Elizur Smith was born on January 5, 1812, in Sandisfield, Massachusetts. His father was a farmer. He went to Westfield Academy while a teenager, and by 1830, became a clerk in the paper-company of John Nye. Smith then purchased 50% of a mill in association with George Washington Platner. He also became associated with telegraph entrepreneur Cyrus W. Field.

They grew the business throughout the 1837 crisis and became leaders in their industry. They manufactured the first paper made from ground wood pulp in the world, which lowered the cost of manufacturing. Its cheaper price made it widely adopted by the newspaper industry. The firm also invented a new high speed manufacturing process which doubled the paper product. In 1861, Smith became one of the founding members of the Writing Paper Manufacturers of America, and became the leading manufacturer in Massachusetts, with $250,000 in capital stock at the time.

In 1865, Smith married Marry Ann Smith, and their home became a social center for various events. In 1869, Smith made his nephew Wellingston Smith the manager of the company and its treasurer. He then acquired a farm named Highlawn, with 700 acres, which became a reputed equestrian estate. It was one of the largest breeding farms in the East Coast of the United States, and one of its horses was priced at $20,000. The residence was filled by rare books, pictures, gems and art pieces from Smith's travels abroad.

Smith imported trotting horses from Kentucky on his estate with some 30 brood mares. His stallions became famous in the racing community, and attended horse shows such as the one in Madison Square Garden, New York. His main home was in the city, while his farm was used as a summer home.

In 1866, Smith formed the Smith Paper Company with his nephews, Wellington Smith and DeWitt Smith, which became the largest fine paper manufacturer in the country, and made them a fortune. Wellington was the father of socialite Elizur Yale Smith, and the great-grandson of Capt. Josiah Yale, members of the Yale family.

== Later life ==
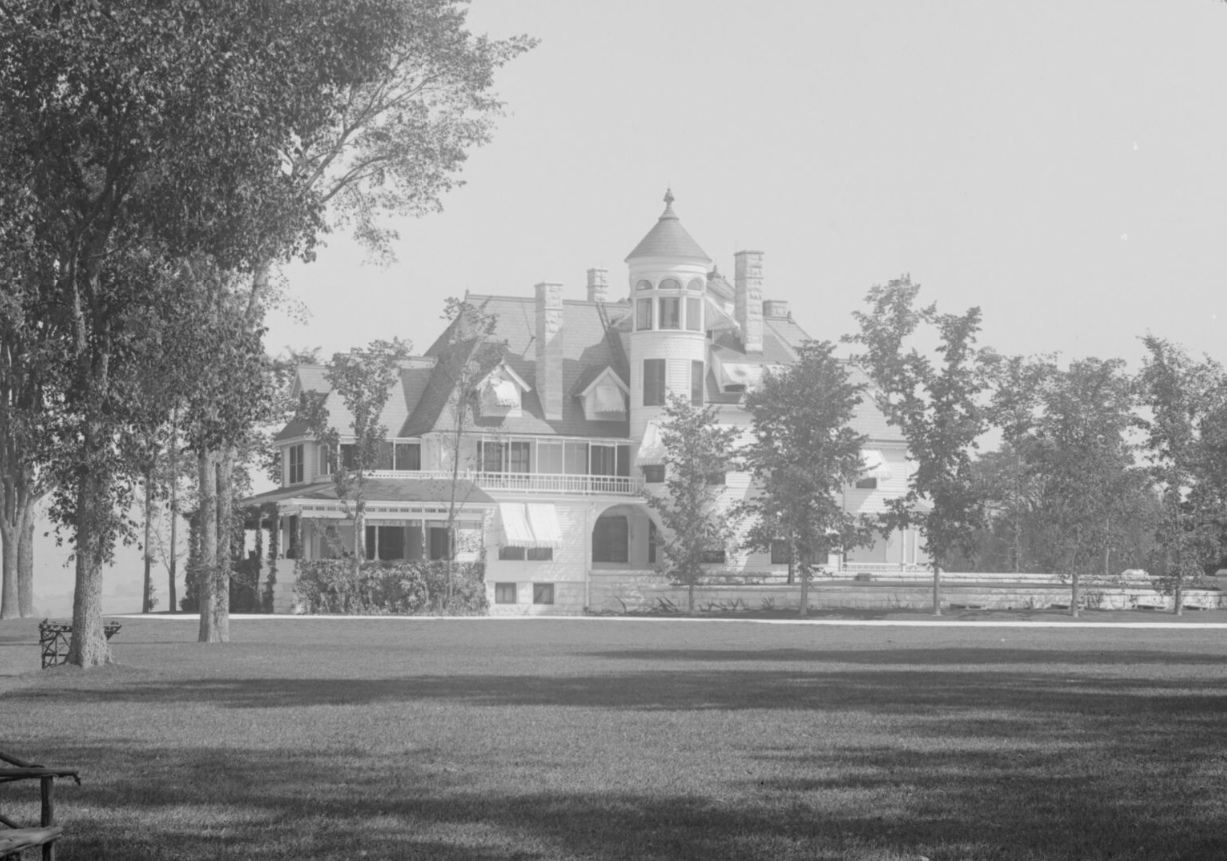
Erskine Park, Massachusetts, built by Thomas Edison's rival, George Westinghouse, on Senator Elizur Smith's estate, Highlawn farm

Smith then served in the Massachusetts House of Representatives in 1848 and 1878, and became a Senator from the southern Berkshire District in 1879 and 1880. At one time, he was the foremost manufacturer in the paper industry in America. His Highlawn farm would grow to 1280 acres after his death, and a part of it would be acquired by Colonel H. George Wilde. In 1876, with the Smith Paper Company, they acquired the plant of the Lenox Plate Company from Theodore Roosevelt.

During his lifetime, the city of Lee, Massachusetts, became one of the prominent centers of paper manufacturing in the United States, producing a variety of papers. The Kimberly-Clark conglomerate was formed from the Platner & Smith Company of Elizur Smith and George Washington Platner, founded in 1835. Smith gave money to Lee for the support of schools, churches and other institutions.

Elizur Smith died at home on April 3, 1889, and his funeral was held at the Congregational Church. Having no children, his fortune, valued at $600,000 in 1889, or over a billion dollars in 2024 money in relation to GDP, was given to his nephews such as Wellington Smith, who inherited Highlawn.

Wellington Smith would later sell the estate to William Douglas Sloane and Emily Thorn Vanderbilt, on which they would build "Elm Court", and to George Westinghouse, the rival of Thomas Edison, who would build "Erskine Park" on the estate.
