= Clermont Livingston Best =

American Civil War Colonel from New York

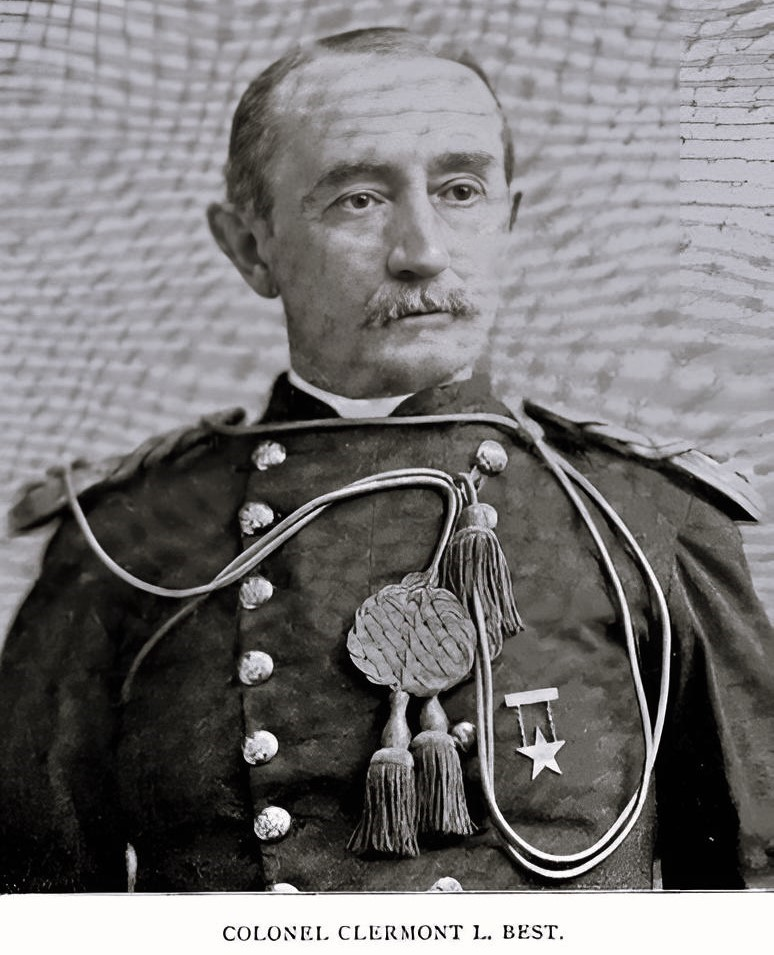
Portrait of Colonel Clermont Livingston Best, husband of Mrs. Tooker

Colonel Clermont Livingston Best (1824–1897) was an American military officer from New York. He was made Colonel of the 4th Artillery under Gen. Nathaniel P. Banks, and became a veteran of the American Civil War, fighting at the Battle of Gettysburg and other battles. He also served at Fort Adams, Rhode Island, of which he was the commander.

He married Mary Tooker, and was the brother-in-law of lawyer Gabriel Mead Tooker, member of Mrs. Astor's Four Hundred during the Gilded Age.

== Biography ==
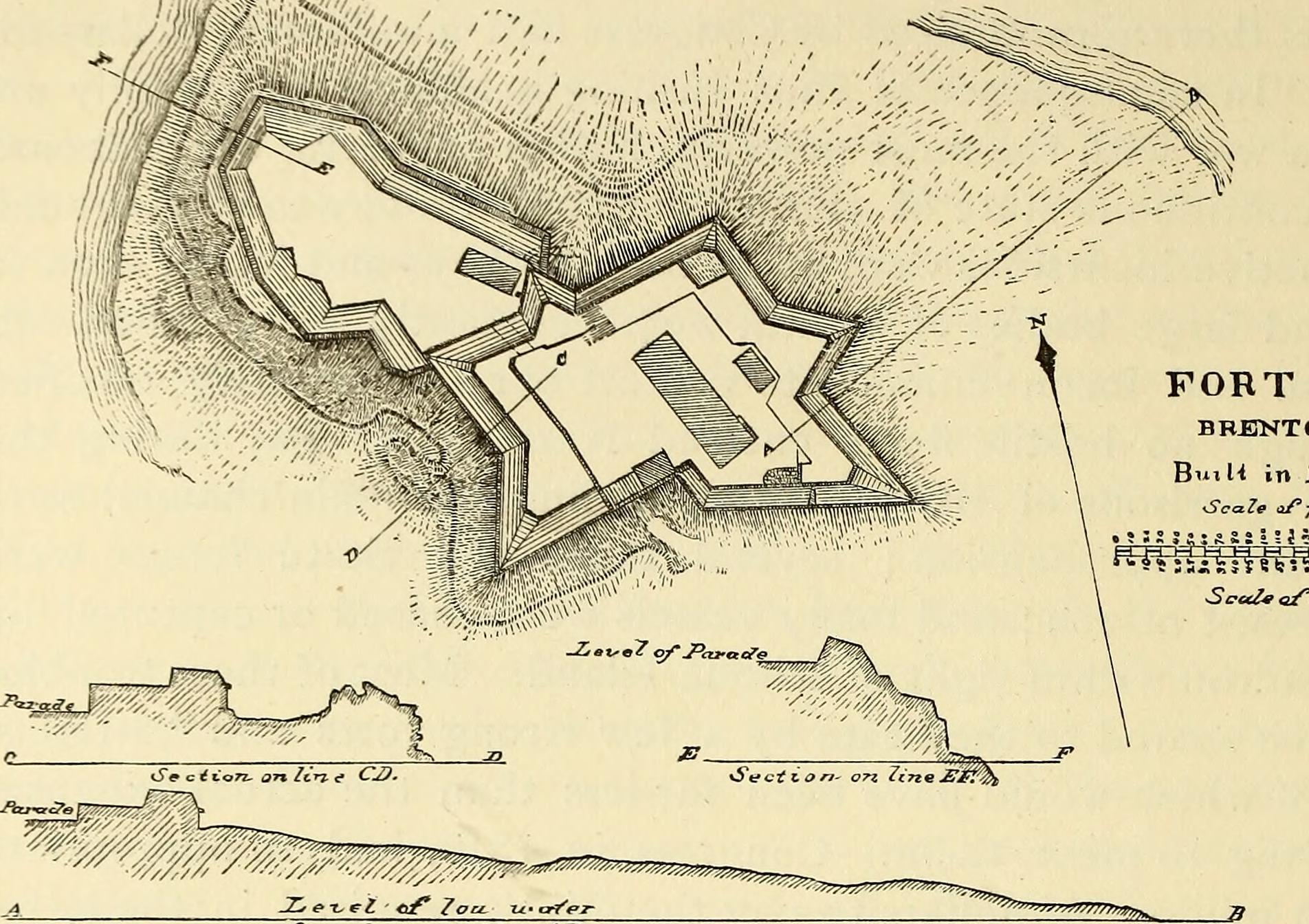
Plan of Fort Adams, Rhode Island, where Best was the commander

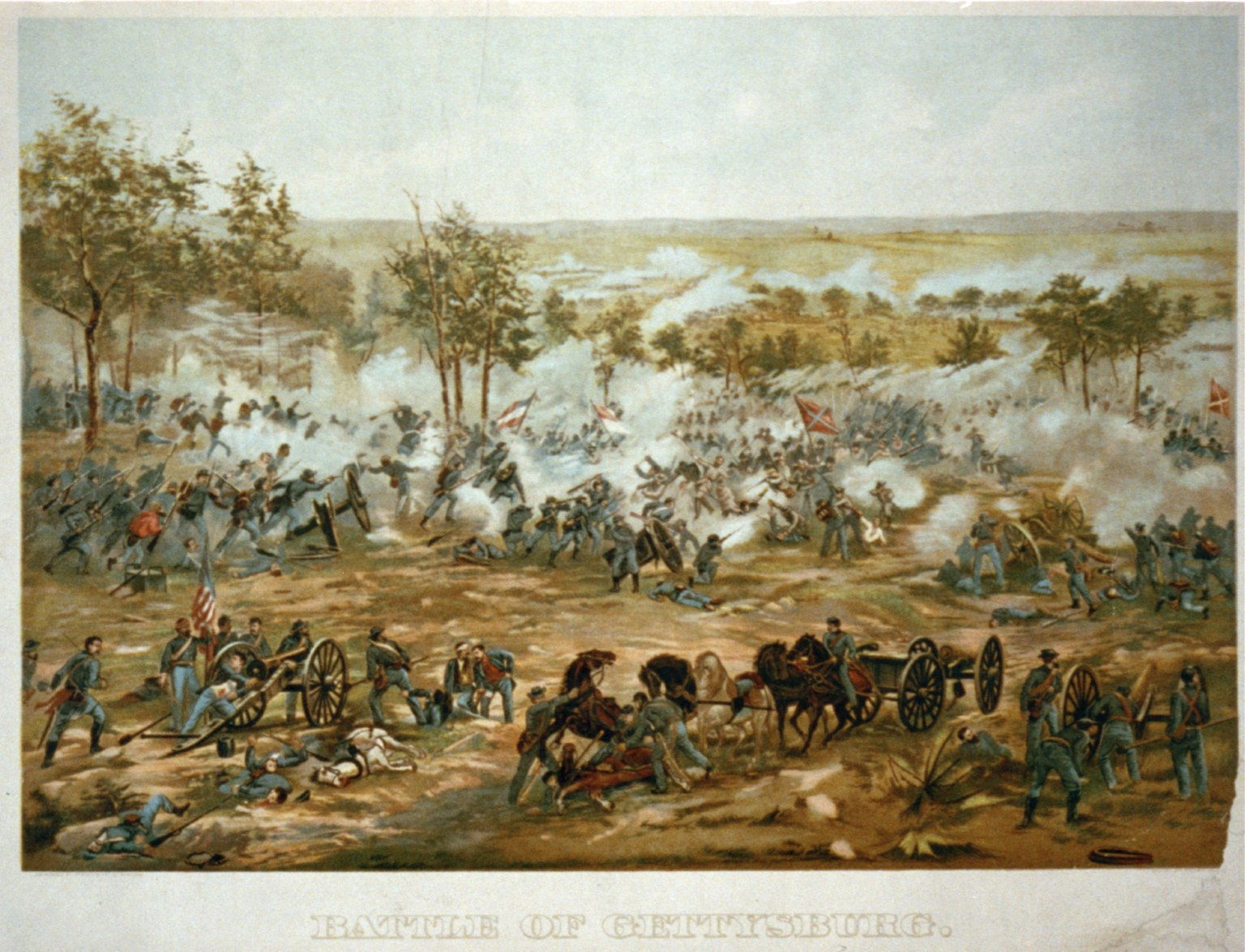
Battle of Gettysburg, Colonel Best was one of its military officers

Clermont Livingston Best was born on April 25, 1824, in Tivoli, New York. He was a descendant of the Livingston family. He was the brother-in-law of Gabriel Mead Tooker, having married Mary Tooker, and uncle of Mrs. Tooker Whitney Warren, wife of the architect of Grand Central Terminal of the Vanderbilts. They were members of Mrs. Astor's The Four Hundred during the Gilded Age.

Best attended the military academy of West Point, and graduated in 1847. He was first appointed as Second Lieutenant to the First Artillery. He was on frontier duty in Kansas, and served during the American-Mexican War. From 1849 and from 1856 to 1857, Best served against the Seminole Tribe of Florida. When the American Civil War started, he was made captain in the Union Army, being in the 4th Artillery under Gen. Nathaniel P. Banks, past Governor of Massachusetts.

He then became chief or artillery of the Fifth Army Corps in 1862 during the Northern Virginia campaign. He served in the Maryland campaign and the Second Battle of Rappahannock Station. He then served at the Battle of Cumberland, Battle of Antietam, and at the Battle of Fredericksburg.

Best fought at the Battle of Cedar Mountain under Gen. Banks. After his service during the Battle of Chancellorsville and the Battle of Gettysburg, he was promoted to the rank of Lieutenant Colonel. When the American Civil War ended, he served as Major of the First Artillery at Fort Delaware, Key West, Fort Independence and at Fort Warren.

He received three brevets for bravery during his military career. and became Colonel of the 4th Artillery in 1883. He then commanded Fort Adams in Rhode Island. He retired from the military on April 25, 1888. Clermont Livingston Best died on April 7, 1897, in New York, at 72 years old, and was buried in Hudson City Cemetery.

His funeral was attended by General Daniel Butterfield, Mrs. Gabriel Mead Tooker, NYC Police Commissioner Rhinelander Waldo, Mrs. G. Van Cortlandt Hamilton, wife Schuyler Hamilton Jr., great-grandson of Alexander Hamilton, Robert Goelet, brother of Ogden Goelet of Ochre Court, and others.

His son, Clermont Livingston Best Jr., became captain and later major in the US army under Gen. William Montrose Graham during the Spanish–American War. His daughter with Mary Tooker was Annie Livingston Best, who married to socialite Elizur Yale Smith, son of millionaire Wellington Smith, and member of the Yale family.
