= Yale (surname) =

Arms of Baron Ellis ap Griffith, heir by marriage of the estate of Plas-yn-Yale, founder of the House of Yale

The surname Yale is derived from the Welsh word "iâl", meaning "clearing" or "glade." Iâl or "Yale" was a commote of medieval Wales, in the Kingdom of Powys and, after that kingdom's dissolution in 1160, Northern Powys. "Yale" became a family name around 1480, when Ellis ap Griffith received the estate of Plas-yn-Iâl by marriage. Ellis' son, David Lloyd Iâl (Yale), is the earliest figure to whom Yale is attached as a surname, and David's son Thomas Yale was an important figure in the early Church of England.

In the early modern period, the family produced Elihu Yale, the benefactor of Yale University.

== Members ==
Notable descendants with the surname include:

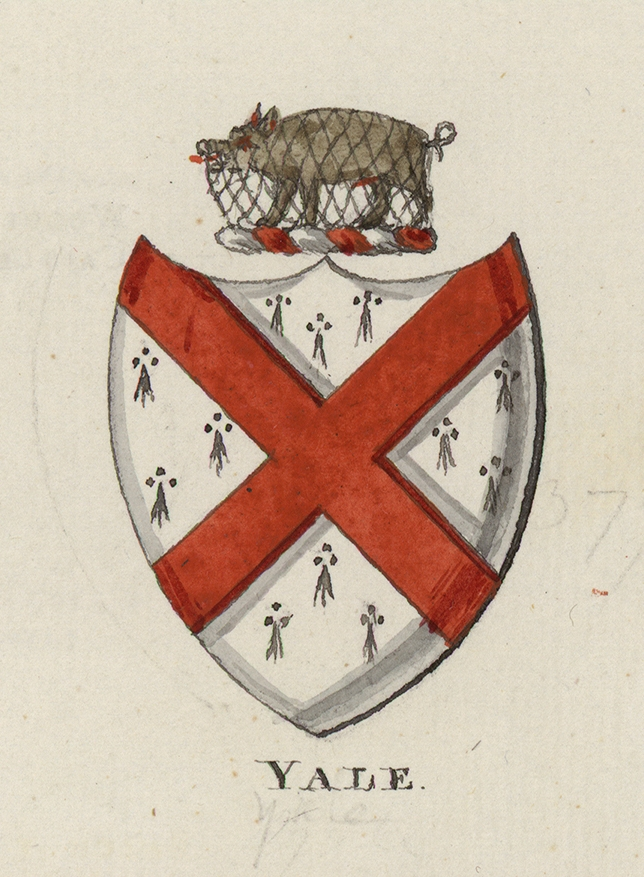
Arms of Chancellor David Yale (c. 1540–1626), first granted by Prince Llywelyn the Great, 13th century

- Thomas Yale (1525/6–1577), co-representative of the Royal House of Mathrafal, Ambassador to Queen Elizabeth Tudor, Chancellor to Archbishop Edmund Grindal, the head of the Church of England, was cousin of the Tudors, family immortalized by William Shakespeare in Henry IV and his Henriad, his grandfather was Baron Ellis ap Griffith, founder of the House of Yale, and grandnephew of Owain Glyndwr, last native Prince of Wales
- David Yale (c. 1540–1626), nephew of Chancellor Thomas Yale, was the Chancellor of Chester and Vicar General of Bishop George Lloydd, was of the family of Sir Simon Weston and the Willoughbys of Wollaton Hall, he was a correspondent of Lord William Cecil of Burghley House
- Thomas Yale Jr. (1616–1683), grandson of Chancellor David Yale of Erddig Park, was captain, merchant, cofounder of New Haven Colony, fought in King Philip's War, half-brother of Samuel Eaton, one of the seven founders of the Harvard Corporation, oldest corporation in America, family cofounded Harvard University
- Thomas Yale (c. 1647–1736), his son, was Captain, cofounder of Wallingford, Connecticut, Justice of the Peace and deputy to the Connecticut General Assembly, was father of Capt. Theophilus Yale, and ancestor of Yale Todd, who was accorded his military pension by Founding Father John Jay before Congress
- Elihu Yale (1649–1721), no descendants, president for the British East India Company, Governor and diamond merchant, retired among of the richest men in Britain, benefactor and namesake of Yale University, family of Gov. Theophilus Eaton and Harvard's first headmaster, Nathaniel Eaton, was father-in-law of Lord James Cavendish, son of the 1st Duke of Devonshire of Chatsworth House and Hardwick Hall
- Theophilus Yale (1675–1760), Connecticut magistrate, captain and Justice of the Peace, was the granduncle of Dr. Lyman Hall, a Founding Father of the United States, his daughter Sarah Yale became the great-grandmother of abolitionist Congressman Sherlock James Andrews, a relative of the Griswolds
- John Yale (c. 1736–1800), Reverend, Rector and Fellow of St John's College, Cambridge, inherited Plas-yn-Yale in Wales, cousin of John Yale, graduate of Jesus College, Oxford, was made Deacon by Bishop John Green, the chaplain of Charles Seymour, 6th Duke of Somerset of Petworth House
- Elihu Yale (1747–1806), Revolutionary War Captain, wealthy bayonet manufacturer, was grandfather of spy Moses Yale Beach, and the granduncle of Judge Jared Potter Kirtland, his cousin, Rev. Thomas Yale, graduated from Yale in 1765
- Josiah Yale (1752–1822), captain during the American War of Independence, was a pioneer of Lee, Massachusetts, Justice of the Peace, Minister Treasurer and Deputy in the Massachusetts House of Representatives, was the great-grandfather of millionaire Wellington Smith, America's largest paper manufacturer and intimate friend of Abraham Lincoln
- Elisha Yale (1780–1853), reverend, first minister of Gloversville, New York, founded Kingsborough Academy, graduated from Yale College, was granduncle of Wellington Smith, one of the largest paper manufacturers in America, nephew of Senator Elizur Smith and father of Elizur Yale Smith, who married the daughter of Col. Clermont Livingston Best of Mrs. Astor's Four Hundred, a relative of Gabriel M. Tooker and Charlotte Tooker, of the Goelets and Vanderbilts
- Burrage Yale (1781–1860), largest tin ware manufacturer in Wakefield, Massachusetts, Justice of the Peace and Postmaster, son founded Lamson, Goodnow & Yale, producing muskets Springfield Model 1861 for Abraham Lincoln's army, family of millionaire Congressman Chester W. Chapin, was step-grandfather of Dr. Roswell Park
- William Yale (1784–1833), merchant, son of patriot Samuel Yale, founder of the Yale manufacturing dynasty of Yalesville, was the largest manufacturer in Meriden, Connecticut, partner of the Griswolds, family of diplomat Henry L. Atherton and the Woodworths, his son-in-law was the proprietor of the "New York Hotel" and a cofounder of the Manhattan Club
- Barnabas Yale (1784–1854), abolitionist lawyer, cofounded Central New-York Anti-Slavery Society, featured in The Liberator, family of Mayor George W. Gardner, the second business partner of John D. Rockefeller, related to Quincy and Adams family, was a cousin of Col. Braddam Yale, family of Venetian Lorenzo Da Ponte, associate of Mozart and Casanova, builder of the first Italian opera in America
- Cyrus Yale (1786–1854), American minister, peace maker and activist, cofounded the US Temperance Union of the Temperance Movement with Stephen Van Rensselaer, of the Van Rensselaer family, the richest man in America, was of the family of Judge John H. Kennard, Congressmen and Senators William Lawrence and James Wakefield, and Harvard professor Edward Durand, Director of US Census Bureau under President Taft
- William Parry Yale (1790–1867), Lieutenant Colonel, magistrate, High Sheriff of Denbighshire, inherited Plas-yn-Yale, fought under the Duke of Wellington during the Napoleonic Wars, served under Lord Lieutenant Robert Myddelton Biddulph, the proprietor of Chirk Castle
- Levi Yale (1792–1872), abolitionist, postmaster, justice of the peace, was cofounder and Lt. Gov. of the Liberty Party of Connecticut, an abolitionist political party which eventually merged to become the Republican Party, he was an agent of the Underground Railroad with Lt. Gov. Douglas, and was cousin of two Yale graduates, Congressman Jonathan Brace and life insurance founder Thomas K. Brace
- Linus Yale, Sr. (1797–1858), American inventor and Bank lock maker, 1st Mayor of Newport, New York, his patents signed by U.S. President Andrew Jackson, obtained US Treasury contract for all the new bank locks, mints, sub-treasuries and custom-houses in the US, was cousin of Burrage Yale of Lamson, Goodnow & Yale, the major gun-machine manufacturer of Abraham Lincoln's army
- James Murray Yale (1798–1871), Montreal, chief trader for the Hudson's Bay Company, fur trader and competitor of John Jacob Astor, Yaletown named after him, in-law of Gov. Sir George Simpson, the de facto Viceroy of Prince Rupert's Land, a cofounder of Canada, and the most powerful man of the North American fur trade, was cousin of merchant William Yale, Gen. Edwin R. Yale, and Moses Yale Beach, one of the richest men in New York
- Moses Yale Beach (1800–1868), newspaper entrepreneur, proprietor of banks, ambassador, owner of the New York Sun, crime news pioneer and most successful paper in America, personal spy of U.S. President James Polk for Mexican–American War, fortune 1/4 of Cornelius Vanderbilt, cofounded the Associated Press, oldest and largest news agency in the United States, his nephew was Governor of the New York Stock Exchange
- Edwin R. Yale (1804–1883), Brigadier General of the New Haven Grays, was a Britannia metal merchant and manufacturer in New York, proprietor of the luxurious landmark U.S. Hotel and Mansion House Hotel in New York, married a member of the Colgate family, of the Colgate-Palmolive conglomerate and Colgate University, was 1st President and cofounder of the abolitionist Sumter Club for Abraham Lincoln
- Charles Dwight Yale (1810–1890), Democratic Senator from Wallingford, son of Britannia ware manufacturer Charles Yale, founder of Yalesville, Connecticut, nephew of Gen. Edwin R. Yale, owner of the largest hotel in America (1830s), competitor of John Jacob Astor's hotel the Astor House, family of Senators Edgar and Charles Atwater and Judge William Gardner Choate, founder of Choate Rosemary Hall
- George Henry Yale (1820–1897), Montreal, Major commander, Mayor of Louiseville, founder of Yaletown, acquired from Lord Samuel Gerrard, was a fur merchant and manufacturer, Justice of the Peace by Baronet Louis-H. La Fontaine, family of William Dalby, Mayor of Victoria, BC and Andrew Yale, shipbuilder for the family of Sir Charles Boucher de Boucherville, Premier of Quebec
- Linus Yale, Jr. (1821–1868), inventor, entrepreneur, founded the Yale Lock Company, Premier manufacturer of locks in the U.S., partner of millionaire Henry R. Towne, a fellow of F.W. Taylor, his son John B. Yale married the daughter of the US Treasury Secretary of Abraham Lincoln, Hugh McCulloch, who was with Lincoln at his deathbed the night of April 14, 1865, main lock manufacturer of Rolls-Royce, company sold for over a billion dollars in 2000
- Rufus M. Yale (1822–1899), Boston merchant, sergeant, leading sailmaker in New England, was cousin of fur trader James Murray Yale and philanthropist Laura Almina Wood, daughter-in-law of Lt. Gov. Julius Catlin, had James Bruce, 8th Earl of Elgin, Governor General of Canada under Queen Victoria, as one of his customers
- William Corbet Yale (1825–1909), Oxford graduate, Deputy Lieutenant of Denbighshire, Wales, heir of Plas-yn-Yale, Madryn Castle and Widcombe Manor, served under Lord Lieutenant William Cornwallis-West, a family member of Prince Hans Heinrich XV von Hochberg and Winston Churchill, Yale was cousin of Sir Thomas Love-Jones-Parry, and nephew of Lt. Gen. Sir Love Jones-Parry
- William H. Yale (1831–1917), Senator, 6th lieutenant governor of Minnesota under Governor Horace Austin, President of the Senate, member of the Minnesota State Senate, co-owner of law firm Yale & Webber, with Senator Daniel S. Norton, US Treasury Secretary and Senator William Windom, Congressman Thomas Wilson and attorney general Charles H. Berry.
- John Wesley Yale (1832–1900), Colonel of the 51st New York Infantry, trustee of the New York State Asylum by Gov. Teddy Roosevelt, was in the paper business, his nephew was Charles Chapin, NYC editor for Congressman Joseph Pulitzer, his sons-in-laws were Mayor John Henry Walrath and baseball team owner George Frazier, his grandson Col. Wesley W. Yale was a tank commander under General Patton
- William Yale Beach (1836–1910), son of Moses Yale Beach, was the first banker of Wallingford, Connecticut, and a real estate developer in New York, his uncle Benjamin Henry Day cofounded the New York Sun, while his cousin, Clarence Day, cofounded Yale University Press
- Merton Yale Cady (1840–1900), architect in Moline, Illinois, grandson of Linus Yale Sr., designed number of projects for his father-in-law, John Deere, was the uncle of airplane manufacturer Willard Lamb Velie, and a family member of William Butterworth, Congressman Benjamin Butterworth and baseball team owner Erastus Wiman
- Theodore Yale Gardner (1841–1900), Presbyterian minister from Cleveland, son of Col. Gardner, brother-in-law of Gen. Orson M. Oviatt's daughter, was brother of mayor George W. Gardner, married the daughter of Col. Nahum Ball Gates, and granddaughter of abolitionist minister John Monteith, he became Western Secretary of the American Education Society, and first pastor of Glenville Church, funded by magnates Louis Severance, Amasa Stone and Samuel Livingston Mather II
- Leroy Milton Yale Jr. (1841–1906), Doctor, surgeon, of Martha's Vineyard and Roosevelt Island, cofounder of the New York Etching Club, family of oil industrialist George H. Bissell, founder of the American oil industry and competitor of John D. Rockefeller, the Nobels and the Rothschilds, married granddaughter of Congressman Thomas D. Eliot, of the Eliot family of poet T.S. Eliot, William G. Eliot, cofounder of Washington University, and Chief Judge William Cranch, nephew of U.S. President John Adams
- John B. Yale (1845–1904), Telegraph and railroad entrepreneur, son of Linus Yale Jr., was a business rival of robber baron Jay Gould, the proprietor of Lyndhurst Castle and the Western Union, cofounded the Bankers and Merchants Telegraph Co., obtained contracts for New York Stock Exchange and Chicago Board of Trade quotations, worked with Congressman Dwight Townsend
- Madeline Yale Wynne (1847–1918), daughter of Linus Yale, wife of Senator Henry Winn, son of Senator Reuben Winn, she was an American artist and philanthropist, her uncle was Congressman and Gen. Halbert S. Greenleaf, her aunt was suffragist Jean Brooks, president of the N.Y. Woman's Suffrage Association, was member of the Social Register of Chicago, and friend of artist Annie Cabot Putnam, of the Cabot and Putnam family
- Charles G. Yale (1847–1926), yachtsman, Bohemian Club member, mining investor, Secretary of the San Francisco Yacht Club, cofounder of the San Francisco Miners' Association with William C. Ralston, founder of the Bank of California, was of the family of General Leonard Bleecker, a personal friend of George Washington and cofounder of the New York Stock Exchange, was grandfather of artist Yale Gracey who worked for Walt Disney
- Charles Yale Beach (1847–1947), real estate investor in New York and Connecticut, son of politician Moses S. Beach, brother-in-law of painter Abbott Handerson Thayer of the Boston Brahmin Thayer family, was among Mark Twain's excursion in the Innocents Abroad, and the excursion of Maj. Gen. Robert Anderson to Fort Sumter
- Ira Yale Sage (1848–1908), U.S. army Colonel, railroad magnate in Atlanta, Georgia, shareholder of the Southern Pacific Railroad, president of various railroads, cousin of Congressman Russell Sage, a partner of Jay Gould who left 70 million fortune in 1906, Sage family of Princess Kay Sage, American royalty, and the Agnelli family of Fiat, Ferrari, and Juventus Football Club
- Franklin L. Yale (1848–1930), Colonel, mining investor, politician, cofounder of the Joplin Stock Exchange in Missouri, served under Gov. William J. Stone, his brother was Rodney Horace Yale, author of the Yale Genealogy book, and Secretary and board director of Dempsters in Nebraska, later sold to Warren Buffett of Berkshire Hathaway, was from Yale, Michigan
- Caroline Ardelia Yale (1848–1933), an American inventor, cousin of Maj. Gen. Hezekiah Barnes, she revolutionized the education of hearing-impaired people, collaborated with Alexander Graham Bell, Yale crater on Venus named in her honor, Grace Coolidge, wife of US President Calvin Coolidge, lived with her family, was related to abolitionist Laura Spelman, wife of John D. Rockefeller
- Julian L. Yale (1850–1909), son of Linus Yale Jr., Chicago railroad entrepreneur, proprietor of Julian L. Yale & Co., purchasing agent for Carnegie Steel of Andrew Carnegie and the Big Four Railroads for the Vanderbilts, founded an electric car company in 1907, sold his enterprise to Buckeye Steel Castings Co. of the Rockefellers, under president Samuel P. Bush, patriarch of the Bush family
- John Reed Yale (1855–1925), N.Y. politician, Freemason, entrepreneur, member of the New York State Assembly, Vice Chairman of the Panama–Pacific International Exposition, chairman of the committee on Railroads, his daughter married Capt. Philip D. Hoyt, the NYC First Police Deputy Commissioner, her father-in-law, a Democratic newspaper owner, was friend of President Franklin D. Roosevelt and launched his political career
- Charles H. Yale (1856–1920), an American entrepreneur, theatre producer and performer in Boston, worked for the Boylston Museum
- Arthur Yale (1860–1917), politician, financier, cofounder of Plateau-Mount Royal in Montreal, proprietor of the Yale Islands, Rivière des Mille Îles, his daughter Claire was a socialite with aristocracy, was nephew of Mayor George Henry Yale, grandnephew of fur merchant James Murray Yale, and cousin of wealthy lawyer Jacob Yale Fortier
- Charles Yale Knight (1868–1940), entrepreneur and inventor of the sleeve valve technology, used for cars, tanks, airplanes, and by the Willys Company, main competitor of Henry Ford, he supplied 26 car manufacturers, produced the Stearns-Knight, Willys-Knight, etc., was praised by Walter Owen Bentley of Bentley Motors
- William M. Yale (1870–1948), a professional baseball player for the MLB in the Brooklyn Dodgers, 1905
- Stanley Yale Beach (1877–1955), grandson of Alfred Ely Beach, the builder of NYC first subway and patent lawyer of Thomas Edison, Bell, Vanderbilt and others, was an entrepreneur, aviation pioneer, Wright brothers competitor, owned Scientific American, seated at the Woolworth Building, financed Gustave Whitehead, built airplanes, airships, dealt with U.S Air Force founder Gen. Mitchell and Howard Hughes
- Mortimer Yale Ferris (1881–1941), N.Y., Senator, civil engineer, member of the N.Y. State Senate, Chairman of the Lake Champlain Bridge Commission, M.I.T graduate, was a Freemason, father graduated from Harvard in medicine, family of Horace T. Pitkin and Mary Yale Pitkin, wife of architect Charles Eliot, son of Charles William Eliot, President of Harvard, members of the Eliot family
- Elizur Yale Smith (1885–1950), Major, military officer, socialite in Newport, Rhode Island, married the daughter of Col. Clermont Livingston Best, descendant of the Livingston family, was executive secretary of the Federal Hall, friend of the Vanderbilts, Roosevelts and Astors
- William Yale (1887–1975), spy, diplomat, husband of Edith Hanna, family of Senator Hanna, the Chairman of the Republicans, and partner of J.P. Morgan & John D. Rockefeller, was Middle East special agent for Secretary Lansing, companion of Lawrence of Arabia, uncle of Thomas B. Yale, Director of Finance of the CIA under George H. W. Bush, Project Azorian with Howard Hughes
- Jacob Yale Fortier (1888–1940), King's Counsel, judge, wealthy lawyer from Montreal, businessman, partner of Senator Jacob Nicol, grandson of Canadian Confederation politician Moïse Fortier, president of the Richelieu, Drummond and Arthabaska Railway, Yale owned 17 companies
- Frankie Yale (née Ioele) (1893–1928), American gangster, employer of Al Capone, fought for the control of the Brooklyn docks
- Charles Yale Harrison (1898–1954), Canadian-American writer and journalist from Montreal, author of the international best seller : Generals Die in Bed, referenced by Ernest Hemingway, was uncle of American novelist Judith Rossner, author of Looking for Mr. Goodbar, earning 22 millions for Paramount Pictures in 1977
- Wesley W. Yale (1900–2001), Colonel of Combat Command B in General Patton's Third Army, had the responsibilities of a general during the Battle of the Bulge, captured Nazi camps, his son was Lt. Col in the US Air Force, worked at Stanford Research Institute, he was a grandson of Col. John Wesley Yale of New York
- Claire Yale (1903–1997), Canadian socialite, philanthropist, daughter of banker Arthur Yale, inherited the Yales Islands, was prominent among Montreal's society and European aristocracy, saved City Hall of St-Eustache with politician Paul Gouin, son of Sir Lomer Gouin, Premier of Quebec
- Joseph Yale Resnick (1924–1969), N.Y., Congressman, entrepreneur, multimillionaire, was candidate for U.S. Senator, his aide became Advisor to U.S. President Bill Clinton, cofounded Channel Master Corporation, was radio officer during WWII
- John Yale (1925–1998), Canadian British aviation artist, grandson of politician Arthur Yale, was Canada's only full-time aviation artist, exposed his works at the Royal Society of British Artists in England, gifted painting to Air Vice-Marshal Sir Harold John Maguire of the Royal Air Force
- Brewster Yale Beach (1925–2008), Episcopal minister, Carl Jung psychotherapist, great-grandson of politician Moses S. Beach, graduated from Yale, was made Canon by Bishop J. Brooke Mosley, head of Delaware Pastoral Institute under board director Mrs. A. Felix du Pont Jr., founded the Center of Jungian Studies in New York
- David Yale (1928–2021), son of Lt. Colonel John Corbert Yale, son of Colonel James Corbet Yale, was fellow at the University of Cambridge, President of the Selden Society, Honorary Queen's Counsel for England and Wales, granted by Queen Elizabeth II, his family were Members of Parliament, taught at Yale Law School in the United States
- William Yale Giles (born 1934), co-proprietor of the Philadelphia Phillies, acquired from the Carpenter/Dupont family, son of Warren Giles, president of the National League of baseball and the Cincinnati Reds, great-grandson of architect Merton Yale Cady, family of Linus Yale Sr. and John Deere, founder of the John Deere conglomerate
- Mark Yale Harris (b. 1936), American artist, hotel chain proprietor, was founder and CEO of AmeriSuites Hotels, sold to Stephen A. Schwarzman's Blackstone Group and Hyatt Hotels Corporation of the Pritzker family.
- Pierre-Paul Yale (b. 1948), doctor, psychiatrist, VP of Quebec Psychiatrists Association, committee expert under Premier Philippe Couillard, family of politician Arthur Yale, in-laws included Minister of Commerce André Rousseau, the cofounder of Montreal Botanical Garden and professor at Sorbonne, Paris, Jacques Rousseau, and chief-engineer and MIT graduate, François Rousseau, partner of Minister Guy Saint-Pierre
- Kim Yale (1953–1997), an American writer and editor for DC Comics, Marvel Comics, and Eclipse Comics, worked on Suicide Squad, Star Trek, and The Batman Chronicles, father was Navy Lieutenant Commander, married to comic books artist John Ostrander
- Stephen Yale-Loehr (born 1954), American attorney, author, Cornell graduate, law professor at Cornell, founding member of Business Immigration Lawyers, adviser concerning President Obama DAPA program
- Brian Yale (born 1968), musician of Matchbox Twenty, nominated for Grammy Awards, partner of artist Rob Thomas, a songwriter for Mick Jagger, Marc Anthony, etc.
- Avery Yale Kamila, a vegan columnist and journalist, wrote for the Portland Press Herald
- Jordan Yale Levine, an American film producer and entrepreneur involved in more than 30 movies, including Rare Objects and Stowaway, founding partner of Yale Productions, made its debut at Tribeca Festival in New York
- Janet Yale, Montreal, Canadian telecommunications lawyer and executive, CEO of Arthritis Society, CEO of Scouts Canada, executive vice president of Telus Communications, board member of CARE Canada

== See also ==
- Ial
