= Wesley W. Yale =

United States Army colonel (1900–2001)

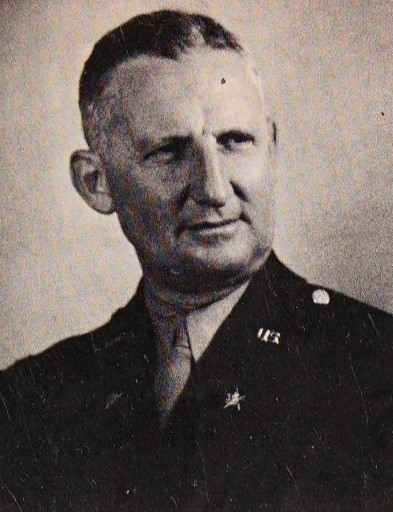
Colonel Wesley Woodworth Yale, General Patton's Third Army

Colonel Wesley Woodworth Yale (1900 – 2001), was a colonel in the United States Army who commanded Combat Command B, 11th Armored Division, throughout the Battle of the Bulge during World War II, being in General Patton's Third Army. He wrote number of articles on warfare toward the end of his career as a specialist on nuclear strike control, and served as a senior analyst at Stanford Research Institute. Through his campaign in Europe, he captured number of Nazi concentration camps from the Germans.

== Early life ==
Wesley Woodworth Yale was born October 6, 1900, in Syracuse, Onondaga County, New York to Lieutenant Wesley Aaron Yale and Jane Wagner. His grandfather was colonel John Wesley Yale of the 51st New York Infantry Regiment, member of the Yale family.

He enrolled at Manlius military school in central New York, in which his grandfather was a patron, and received an honor school appointment to West Point. While at school, he became passionate about practicing polo, which made him later joined the Cavalry. He became assistant editor of the Howitzer. Polo was the main sport in various regiments, and he kept training in the 4th, 7th, 11th, and 26th Cavalry units. After graduating from the Cavalry School in 1929, he joined the army. Around 1939, he is recorded in the Cavalry Journal as captain of the 9th Cavalry at Fort Riley, Kansas.

== Career ==
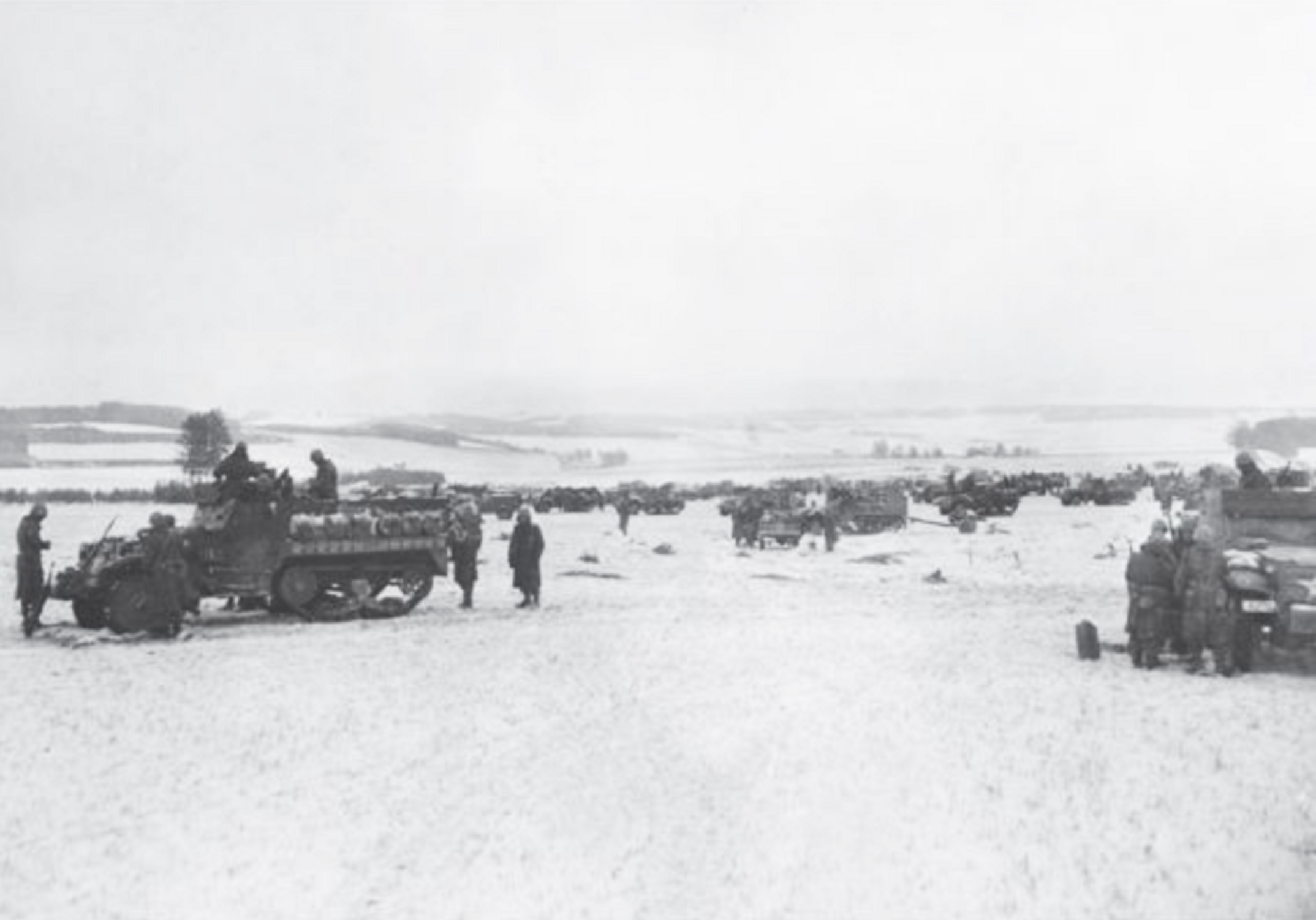
11th Armored Division during the World War II, half-tracks massed on the outskirts of Bastogne, Belgium

Yale started in the army as aide to Brigadier General Hamilton S. Hawkins III. He served him for seven years while the general commanded the 1st Cavalry Brigade. He then joined the Naval War College, and after graduation, commanded the 36th Armored Regiment, and thereafter, commanded the Combat Command B. He was also chief of staff. While in command, General Patton advised him "to treat 'em like horses". Within weeks, Yale commanded the 11th Armored Division at the Battle of the Bulge, and Combat Command B was leading Patton's Third Army to Linz in Austria.

The mission given to the 11th and the 87th Armored divisions was to swing west around Bastogne, Belgium and capture the heights south of Houffalize, and secure the Ourthe River line. General Charles S. Kilburn decided to split the forces and had Yale leading the east side while General Willard A. Holbrook Jr. led the west side. Yale divided CCB into a tank force and an infantry task force. On 2 January he asked permission to capture the town of Mande-Saint-Étienne and was granted permission. Ample artillery was wired in to support the attack and twelve battalions fired about 3,800 rounds on 120 objectives.

On April 25, 1945, Col. Yale commanded CCB through the Thuringian Forest, Germany, toward a Nazi concentration camp. Yale shouted orders in his radio, and tanks and mobile guns moved toward the ridge, and after raising his hand, he gave the command to fire. The French, English, Russians, Polish, Dutchmen, Belgians, Norwegians and American prisoners in the camp started singing "Georgie Patton, come and get us! Georgie Patton, set us free!". After hearing the voices, Col. Yale shouted "what are we waiting for?" and sent hundred of vehicles, including tanks, jeeps and trucks rescuing the prisoners from the camps. They liberated from the SS about 3,000 prisoners from Bamberg, and on their way to Flossenbürg and Buchenwald camps, they met another 16,000.

Then at Stamsried, Col. Yale's brigade found hundreds of British prisoners who had been captured by the SS since the Battle of Dunkirk, and discovered others starving at the Posing camp. Col. Yale's regiment marched toward Zwettl an der Rodl in Austria, and liberated other British prisoners at the Waxenberg camps, and by capturing Zwettl, they blocked the north-east access to Linz, Adolf Hitler's hometown. This was about a few days after Hitler committed suicide, not seeing the fall of his birthplace Braunau am Inn and of his nearby hometown Linz. Under the command of General Holmes E. Dager of the 11th Armored Division, who was communicating with the Russian's Red Army, Col. Yale captured Gallneukirchen and Katsdorf, becoming the unit furthest east of all Western Allied units in Europe, except those of Greece. For Sgt. Kosiek heroic act of capturing the Nazi Concentration Camps of Mauthausen and Gusen despite being outnumbered, Col. Yale sent a letter to General Patton recommending him for the Legion of Merit.

== Later life ==
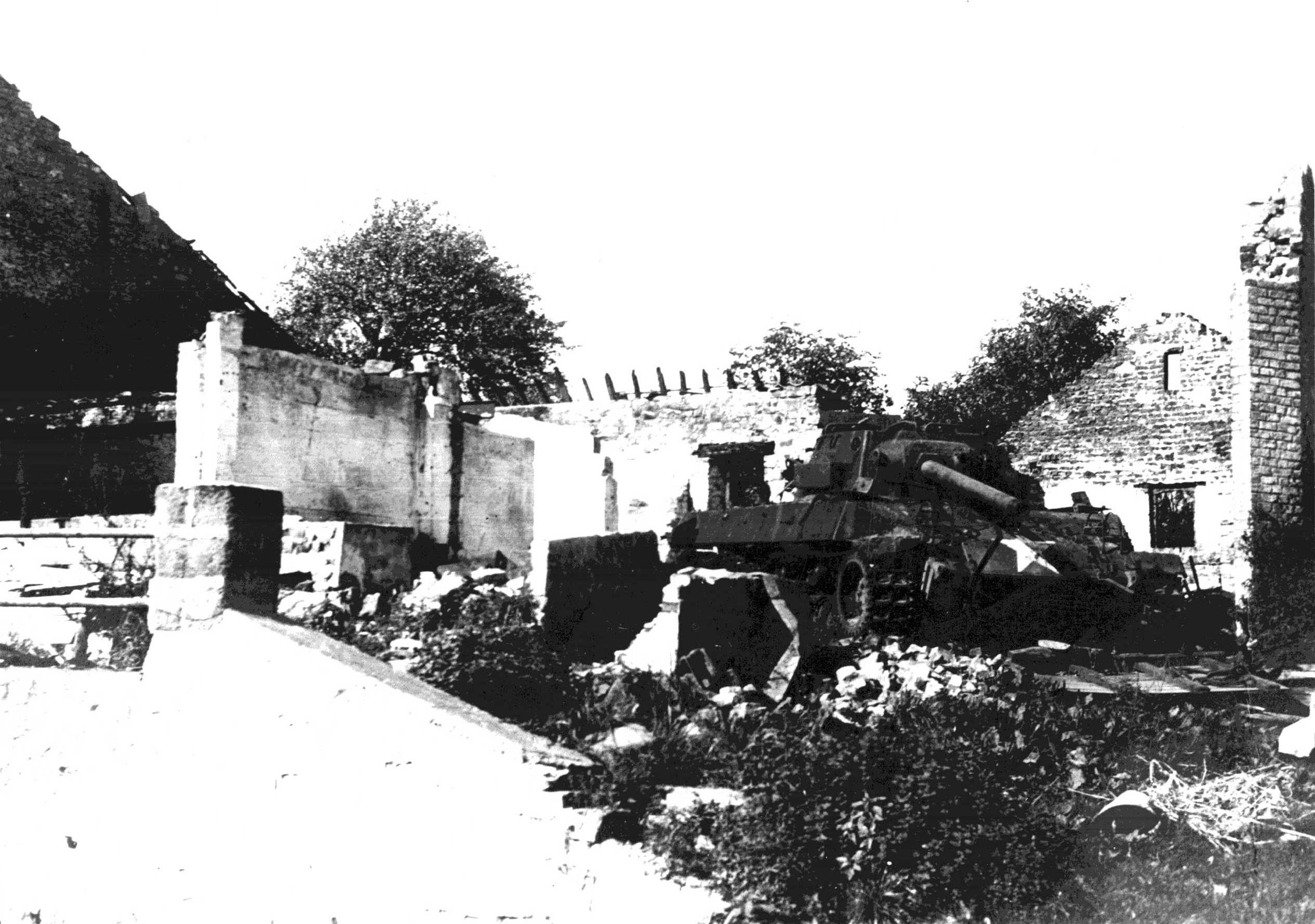
Battle of the Bulge, 1945, during the winter

In 1953, Col. Yale was appointed board director of Magazzini Generali in Trieste, Italy. He became an expert on nuclear strike control and served as cavalryman and tank commander throughout is military career. He commanded leading elements of Patton's Third Army for the greater part of the Battle of the Bulge to the end of World War II. The Battle of the Bulge was the largest and bloodiest single battle fought by the United States in World War II, with Adolf Hitler commanding the German army at the time. He also became editor of Armor Magazine, and over the past ten years, was senior analyst on command-control communications at Stanford Research Institute.

His regiment was the leading command of General Patton's Third Army from the Bulge to the end of the war in Linz, Austria. He was recognized by his commander, General Lyman Lemnitzer, Supreme Allied Commander Europe of NATO, as having been given the troops and responsibilities of a general during the war.

Colonel Yale was decorated with two Silver Star medals, the Legion of Merit, a Bronze Star Medal for valor, the Purple Heart and the Order of the Patriotic War Second Class from the Union of Soviet Socialist Republics. When he retired, he served as senior military operations analyst at Stanford Research Institute, with a specialization on mobile warfare. He was also a friend of General Otto P. Weyland, chief of General Patton's tactical air warfare, and fought with him in the Third Army. With General Paul L. Freeman Jr., Commander in Chief, he wrote "The Nuclear Freeze and National Security".

In 1970, Colonel Yale, Major General Isaac D. White, and General Hasso von Manteuffel, a German baron, wrote together a book named "Alternative to Armageddon". From their experience fighting in Europe, these retired military officers wrote this book to propose a modern version of “Blitzkrieg” as a means of avoiding lengthy conflicts like Vietnam. They were of the view that with the advent of the nuclear age, war was becoming too terrible and they presented a concept of war that would preclude the use of nuclear weapons.

== Death ==
Col. Yale died January 14, 2001, at the age of 100 years old, and was buried at West Point Cemetery on the grounds of the United States Military Academy, West Point, New York.

He married Lillian C. Lackey, whom he met at Fort Stotsenburg in the Philippines with the 26th Cavalry regiment. His wife was the daughter of the Artillery Commander, and they had two sons together :

- John Walker Yale (1928–2016), lieutenant colonel in the US Air Force, USMA, who served in Vietnam with distinction
- Thomas Hamilton Yale (1938–2011), professor of life sciences at Bakersfield College in California
