= William H. Gentry House =

Historic house in Missouri, United States

- U.S. National Register of Historic Places
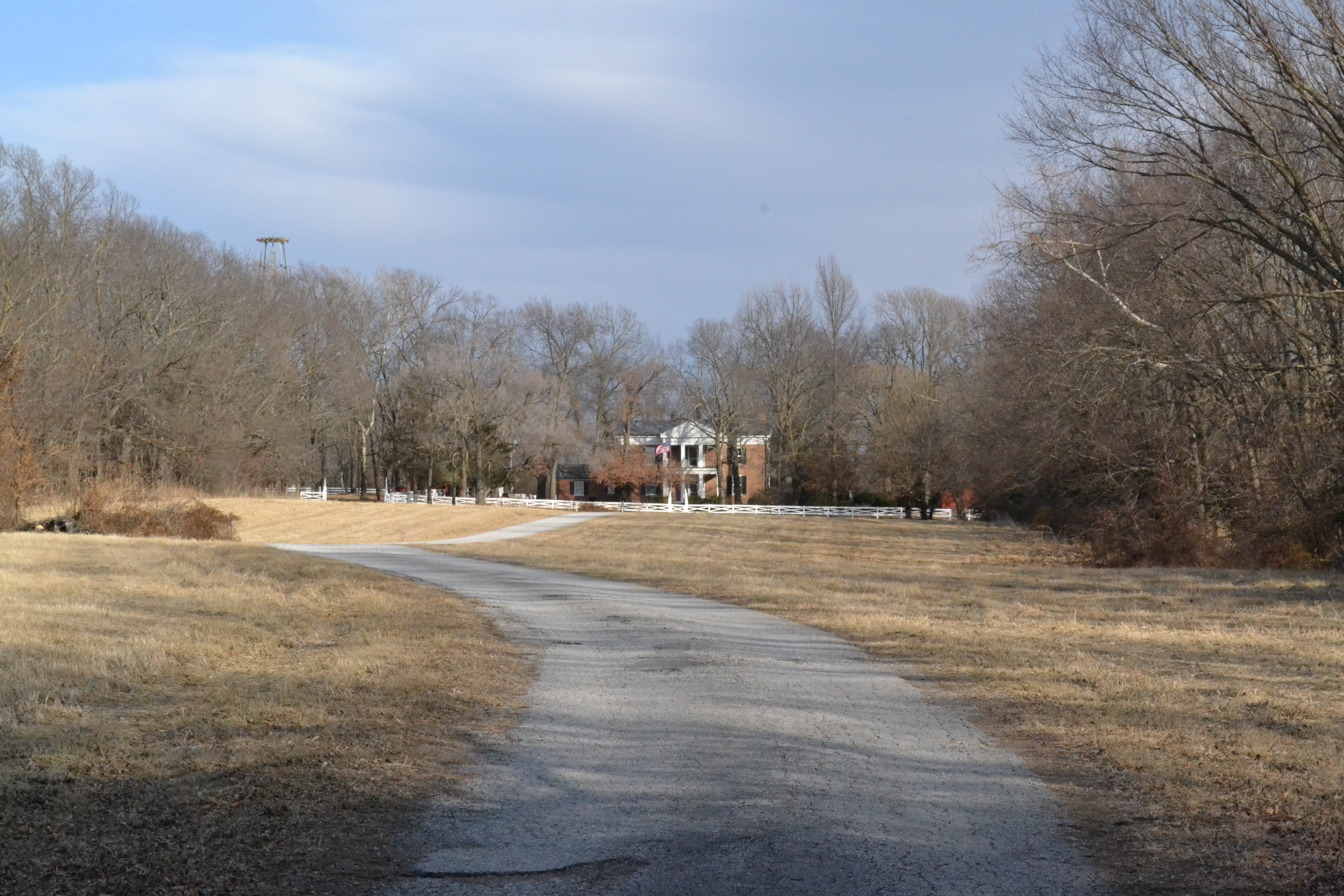

- Location within Missouri Location within the United States
- Location: 22970 Cherry Tree Ln., near Sedalia, Missouri
- Coordinates: 38°44′38″N 93°15′31″W
- Area: less than one acre
- Built: c. 1855
- Architectural style: Greek Revival
- MPS: Antebellum Resources of Johnson, Lafayette, Pettis, and Saline Counties MPS
- NRHP reference No.: 97001434
- Added to NRHP: November 14, 1997

William H. Gentry House, also known as Oak Dale, Cloney Family Farm, and Curry Farm, is a historic home located near Sedalia, Pettis County, Missouri. It was built about 1855, and is a two-story, vernacular Greek Revival style brick I-house. It has a central passage plan, two-story rear ell, and features a pedimented, two-story front portico.

It was listed on the National Register of Historic Places in 1997.
