= Gabriel Mead Tooker =

American lawyer

- Born: December 12, 1839; New York City, New York, U.S.
- Died: December 11, 1905 (aged 65); Monte Carlo, Monaco
- Education: Columbia College; Columbia Law School
- Spouse: Margaret Augusta Peckham (m. 1862; died 1888)
- Children: 3
- Relatives: Whitney Warren (son-in-law); J. Wadsworth Ritchie (son-in-law)

Gabriel Mead Tooker (December 12, 1839 – December 11, 1905) was an American lawyer and clubman who was prominent in New York Society during the Gilded Age. He was a member of Mrs. Astor's list named the "Four Hundred".

== Early life ==
Tooker was born on December 12, 1839, in New York City. He was the third of seven children born to John F. Tooker (1807–1849) and Mary A. (née Mead) Tooker (b. 1811), who married in 1835. His maternal grandfather was William Mead of Greenwich, Connecticut, and his brother-in-law was Col. Clermont Livingston Best.

He was the uncle of Annie Livingston Tooker Best, wife of Elizur Yale Smith of the Yale family, and were prominent in New York and Newport society. Her husband was the son of Wellington Smith, one of the world's largest paper manufacturer at the time, and was proprietor of a horsing estate that was later sold to William Douglas Sloane.

Annie was a protegee of Mrs. Astor and Mrs. Stuyvesant Fish. She had Gladys Vanderbilt of the Breakers and Countess Beroldingen at her debutante party in New York, and was personally invited to Mrs. Astor gala at the Beechwood Estate. She was also announced by her son, John Jacob Astor IV, who later perished on the Titanic, and was a member of The Four Hundred during the Gilded Age, along with her cousin Charlotte Tooker Warren.

Tooker graduated with an A.M. degree from Columbia College in 1859 and a LL.B. degree in 1861.

== Career ==
Tooker's family was prominent as merchants in New York City with the firm Tooker, Mead & Company. The firm had been run by his parents families. Tooker was a lawyer, with an office at 23 Nassau Street in lower Manhattan, who was also known as a successful investor.

=== Society life ===
In 1892, the widower Tooker was included in Ward McAllister's "Four Hundred", purported to be an index of New York's best families, published in The New York Times. Conveniently, 400 was the number of people that could fit into Mrs. Astor's ballroom. He was a member of the New-York Historical Society, and an active member of the Reading Room, a gentlemen's club in Newport.

The Tookers owned one of the finest homes in Newport, Rhode Island, referred to as the "Tooker villa", at Kay and Bellevue Avenue, and took part in prominent society there. In 1895, following the marriage of his youngest daughter Emily, Tooker gifts the house, including all its furnishings, chandeliers, and draperies, to his children, who promptly divided the contents and sold the home. His elder daughter was considered the "beauty of the family" and his younger daughter Emily, who was "not in the least bit pretty," was reportedly engaged to A. Lanfear Norrie.

== Personal life ==
On December 2, 1862, Tooker was married to Margaret Augusta Peckham (1843–1888), the daughter of Dr. Walton Hazard Peckham and Margaret (née Milderburger) Stuyvesant Peckham. Margaret was the first cousin of biologist George William Peckham and Supreme Court Justice Rufus Wheeler Peckham and niece of U.S. Representative Rufus W. Peckham and District Attorney Wheeler H. Peckham, all descendants of George Hazard, a Governor of the Colony of Rhode Island. The Tookers New York residence was at 675 Fifth Avenue. Together, they were the parents of:

- Charlotte Augusta Tooker (1864–1951), who married architect Whitney Warren (1864–1943) of Warren and Wetmore, in 1884.
- John Stansbury "Jack" Tooker (b. 1866), an 1890 Harvard graduate who married Maud Somerville Jaffray (1871–1947) in 1903.
- Emily Montague Tooker (1872–1903), who married J. Wadsworth Ritchie (1861–1924), son of Cornelia Adair and grandson of General James S. Wadsworth, in 1895.

His wife died in Rome, Italy, on February 4, 1888. Tooker died on December 11, 1905, at Monte Carlo in Monaco, after having lived abroad for twenty years. He was buried alongside his wife in Rome, however, a memorial was place at Island Cemetery in Newport, Rhode Island.

=== Descendants ===
Through his daughter Charlotte, he was the grandfather of Charlotte Augusta Warren (1885–1957), who married William Greenough, and Whitney Warren Jr. (1898–1986), who was a horticulturalist and patron of the arts. Warren Jr. was referred to as "an overly rich bachelor operating in San Francisco" who traveled around the world.
