= Phillips Woolen Mill =

- U.S. National Register of Historic Places
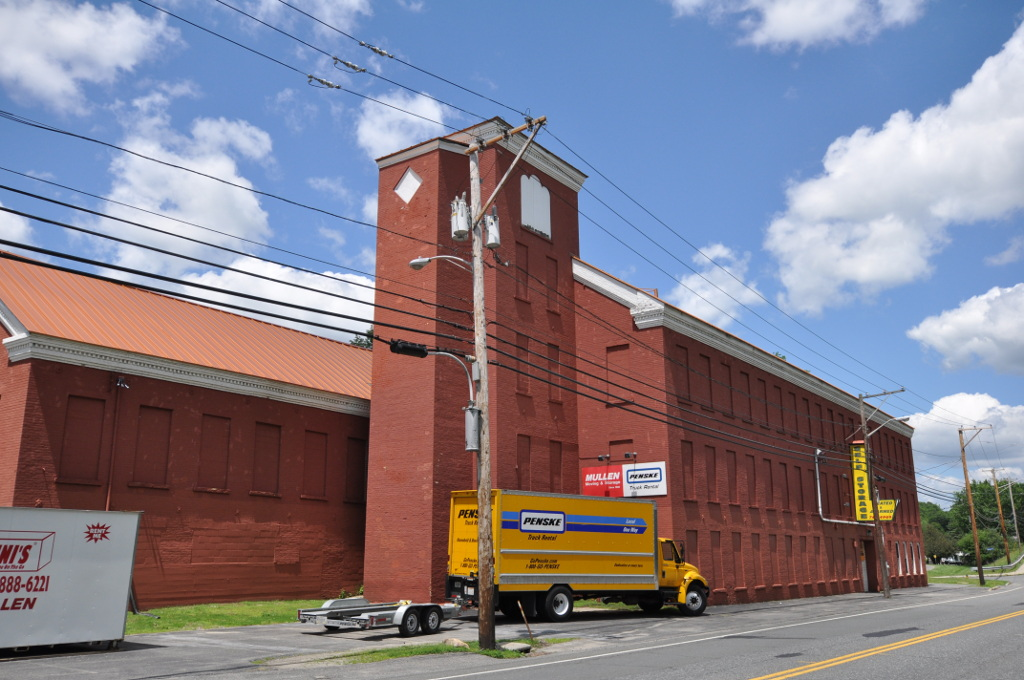

- Location within Massachusetts Location within the United States
- Location: 71 Grove St., Adams, Massachusetts
- Coordinates: 42°36′23″N 73°8′5″W
- Area: 1.1 acres (0.45 ha)
- NRHP reference No.: 82001897
- Added to NRHP: September 30, 1982

Phillips Woolen Mill is a historic mill at 71 Grove Street in Adams, Massachusetts. With a construction history dating to the mid-19th century, it is a good example of small textile mill complex of that period, containing elements that date from the 1920s potentially back as far as the 1830s. The mill complex was added to the National Historic Register in 1982.

== Description and history ==
The former Phillips Woolen Mill Complex is located on the west side of Grove Street in southern Adams, near the town line with Cheshire. The main building is a three-story brick structure, with a four-story square tower at its southern end. Attached to this are four other structures, two of brick and one of stone. The sixth structure is a 1920s steel and concrete structure. The mill's original water power features, including head and tail races, have been filled in.

The date of its oldest portions is difficult to assess: when it was clearly associated with the firm of Blackinton and Phillips in the 1850s, it may have already included portions of an earlier millworks on the site, which were known to have been built as far back as 1828. Some portions of the mill show signs of Greek Revival architecture, which was no longer in fashion in the 1850s. Many histories give the mills construction date as 1864, because that is the date it was converted to for use as a woolen mill. Benjamin F. Phillips and Peter Blackinton engaged in a long-running series of partnerships, owning and operating mills in Adams. The partnership was dissolved in 1864, and Phillips took over what was known as the Greylock Woolen Mill. His enterprise manufactured "cashmeres, ladies' dress goods, and shawls" in its facilities into the 1930s, although the company went through a variety of transformations, being known at the end as the Adams Woolen Manufacturing Company.

== See also ==
- National Register of Historic Places listings in Berkshire County, Massachusetts
