= Theodore Yale Gardner =

Reverend and first pastor of Glenville, Cleveland

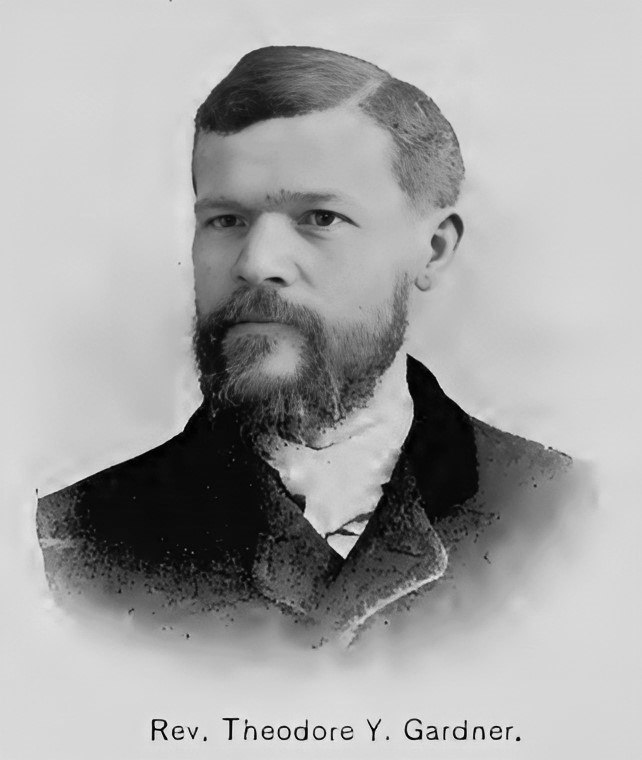
Portrait of Rev. Theodore Yale Gardner, pastor of Glenville, Cleveland

Reverend Theodore Yale Gardner (1841–1900) was an American Presbyterian and Congregationalist minister from Cleveland, Ohio. He was the first pastor of Glenville, Cleveland, and the Western Secretary of the American College and Education Society in Boston. He became the cofounder, along with Col. Ransom, of the Alpha Nu Chapter of the Beta Theta Pi at the University of Kansas, seated at John Palmer Usher's house.

Gardner was also one of the 28 members of the Presbyterian Club of Cleveland, along with Rev. Anson Smyth, founder of the Cleveland Public Library, and Rev. Carroll Cutler, president of Case Western Reserve University.

== Early life ==
Gardner was born on December 23, 1841, in Cleveland, Ohio, to Col. James S. Gardner and Griselda Porter. His grandmother was Eunice Yale, daughter of Capt. Josiah Yale, and sister of Rev. Cyrus Yale, members of the Yale family. His brother, George W. Gardner, was a large grain dealer in Cleveland, and was elected its mayor on two occasions. He was also involved in politics with Senator Mark Hanna, chairman of the Republicans, and was one of the first business partners of John D. Rockefeller, who later founded the Standard Oil Company. His sister-in-law, Miss. Oviatt, was the daughter of Gen. Orson Minott Oviatt.

His father came to Cleveland in 1838, arriving from Pittsfield, Massachusetts, and founded the firm Gardner & Vincent. It became one of the two oldest manufacturers of furniture in Cleveland. Rev. Gardner would become a Presbyterian and Congregationalist minister for several congregations throughout Ohio's Western Reserve. A family collection consisting of portraits, works, and photographs, is now at the Western Reserve Historical Society.

== Biography ==
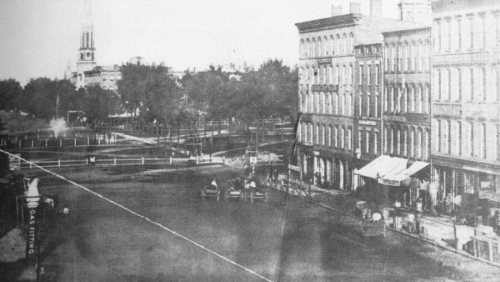
Photograph of Cleveland, Ohio, in 1857

Gardner graduated from Central High School in 1859, and attended Alderbert College at the Western Reserve Academy. He enrolled in the Union Army during the American Civil War, but would not be involved in battles. He then served at the United States Sanitary Commission in Knoxville, Tennessee, during the war. He was present at the capture of Gen. Jefferson Davis. He became a student at the Union Theological Seminary and graduated in 1868.

Gardner became a missionary in Kansas, where he helped with the establishment of its early settlers, and became the pastor at Fort Scott. In 1869, Gardner left Kansas for Ohio, and then, in 1871, went to Lawrence, Massachusetts, to serve at the Presbyterian Church. He arrived in Ohio in 1874, and became pastor of the Presbyterian Church of Streetsboro. He then went to Hudson, Ohio, in 1876, and became pastor of its Congregational Church. After his arrival from Hudson, Gardner joined the Presbyterian Club of Cleveland.

Gardner was one of the 28 members of the club at the opening of 1896, with members including, Rev. Ebenezer Bushnell, Secretary and board director of Western Reserve University, and Rev. Carroll Cutler, 4th president of Case Western Reserve University, who frequently entertained the members at his home. The club's secretary was Rev. Anson Smyth, an Ohio school reformer with Senator Harvey Rice, who founded the Cleveland Public Library. The club's mission was to bring the various pastors of Cleveland together as brothers. They promoted an atmosphere of freedom of opinion and fostered debates between its members.

The Glenville Presbyterian Church was organized on June 10, 1894, with 36 charter members. The philanthropists who donated substantial funds to erect the chapel were; Cleveland's richest man, Samuel Livingston Mather II, proprietor of the Pickands Mather Group, banker Louis Severance, one of the founders of Standard Oil of the Rockefellers, manufacturer Edward Williams, proprietor of the Sherwin-Williams Company, railroad magnate Amasa Stone, one of the associates of Standard Oil, and the Binghams of the W. Bingham Company.

== Later life ==
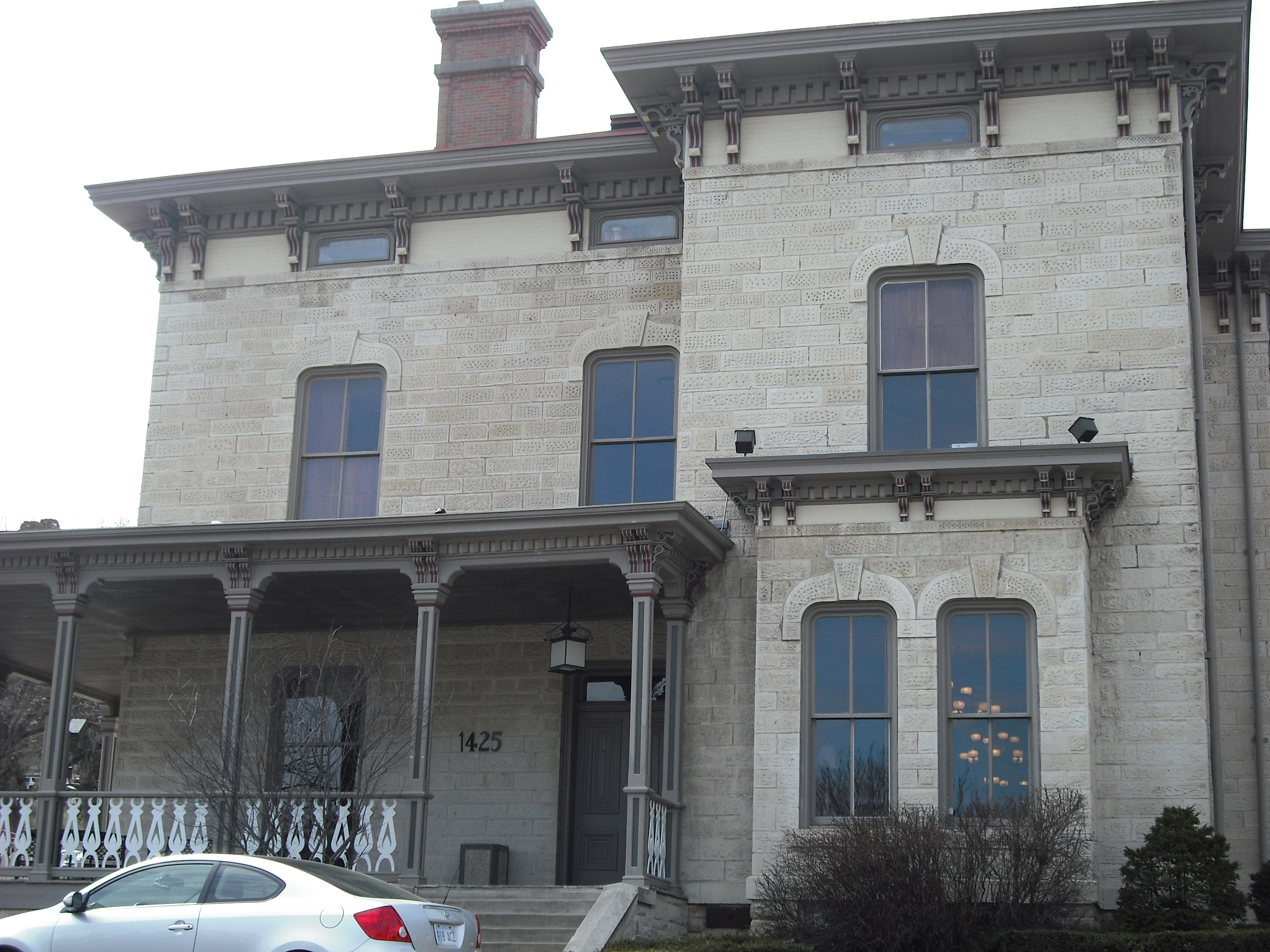
John Palmer Usher's house of the Beta Theta Pi at the University of Kansas

Gardner became the first pastor of its church in Glenville, Cleveland. Rev. Charles L. Zorbaugh was initially considered for the pastorate, but decided to go to Windermere instead. Gardner began supplying the pulpit on June 23, 1895, and was made pastor-elect on August 1, 1895. He then assumed his functions by the committee of the Cleveland Presbytery on October 30, 1895. The church was located in a fast growing suburb of Cleveland at the time.

Gardner also became president of the Ladies' Aid Society of the church. He lived on Doan Street, near the Forest Hill District, where John D. Rockefeller Sr. and John D. Rockefeller Jr. had their summer home at the time. In 1872, with Col. Wyllys C. Ransom, who served under Gen. Nathaniel Lyon, Rev. Gardner cofounded the Alpha Nu Chapter of the Beta Theta Pi at the University of Kansas. The fraternity house used for the chapter since 1912 is John Palmer Usher's mansion, who was the Secretary of the Interior of Abraham Lincoln during the American Civil War.

In 1885, Gardner became the Western Secretary of the American College and Education Society, seated at the Congregational House in Boston. He helped raise funds through the society for Rollins College, Colorado College, Whitman College, and other institutions. He was also in charge and helped raise funds for the Slavic department at Oberlin College, at the time named Oberlin Theological Seminary.

Theodore Yale Gardner died in Cleveland on February 11, 1900, at 58 years old. He was married to Charlotte Augusta Gates, daughter of Col. Nahum Ball Gates, and granddaughter of abolitionist minister John Monteith, who cofounded the University of Michigan, and used his mansion as a station of the Underground Railroad. Gardner's brother-in-law, William Nahum Gates, founded the third oldest advertising agency in the United States, and was a board trustee of the Cleveland Trust Co.
