= Tashmoo =

Tashmoo may refer to:

- Tashmoo Park, an amusement park in Algonac, Michigan that existed from 1897 to 1951
- PS Tashmoo, an 1899 American steamboat
