= Henry Rice =

Henry Rice may refer to:

- Henry Rice (politician) (1786–1867), American merchant and politician from Massachusetts
- Henry Rice (writer) (1585 or 1586 – 1651), Welsh writer and courtier
- Henry Freeman Rice (1818-1887), American businessman and politician
- Henry M. Rice (1816–1894), American politician
  - Henry Mower Rice (Triebel), a 1916 marble sculpture by Frederick Triebel
- Henry Gordon Rice (1920–2003), American logician and mathematician, author of Rice's theorem
- Henry Rice Guild, (1928-2019), American lawyer, director of the Pioneer Fund

== See also ==
- Harry Rice (1901–1971), American baseball outfielder
