= George W. Gardner =

American politician (1834–1911)

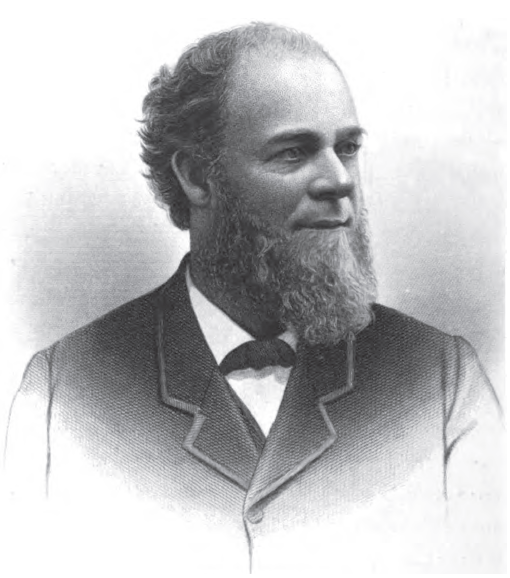

28th Mayor of Cleveland
- In office 1885–1886
- Preceded by: John H. Farley
- Succeeded by: Brenton D. Babcock

30th Mayor of Cleveland
- In office 1889–1890
- Preceded by: Brenton D. Babcock
- Succeeded by: William G. Rose

Personal details
- Born: February 7, 1834 Pittsfield, Massachusetts, US
- Died: December 18, 1911 (aged 77) Dayton, Ohio, US
- Party: Republican
- Spouse: Rosaline Oviatt (m. 1857)
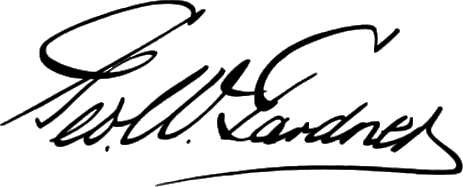
- Signature

George W. Gardner (1834–1911) was a grain dealer and the 28th and 30th Mayor of Cleveland, serving two terms as a Republican. He was also co-proprietor with John D. Rockefeller and Maurice B. Clark of the firm Clark, Gardner & Company, later Clark & Rockefeller, commission merchants. They were the largest grain dealers in Cleveland before Rockefeller went on with Clark in the oil industry.

== Early life ==
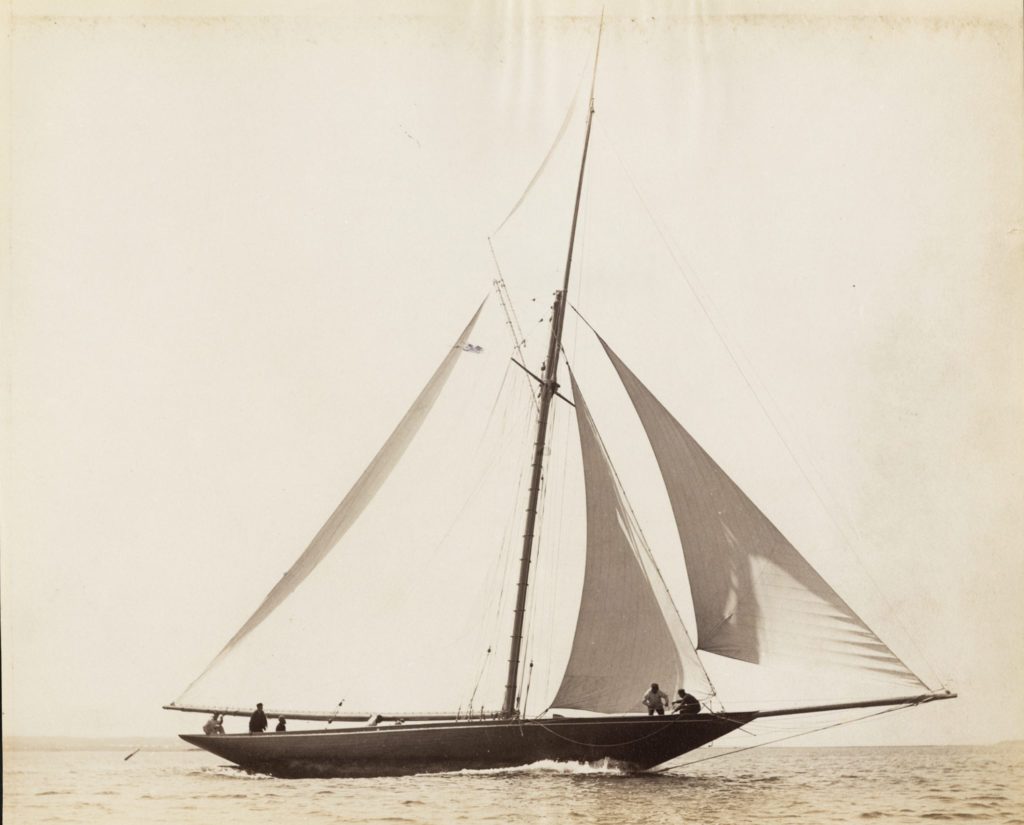
The yacht Wasp, sailing vessel of George W. Gardner, 1892

Gardner was born on February 7, 1834, in Pittsfield, Massachusetts, to Colonel James Gardner and Griselda Porter. His father was a manufacturer of furniture, proprietor of Gardner & Vincent, one of the two oldest firms in Cleveland at the time.

His brother James was a merchant in Cleveland, later in the newspaper business in Cincinnati, and fought in the 150th Ohio Infantry Regiment during the American Civil War. Another brother was Rev. Theodore Yale Gardner, minister of the Presbyterian Church, whose wife was president of the Ladies' aid societies and daughter of Colonel Nahum Ball Gates.

Their grandmother was Eunice Yale, daughter of Capt. Josiah Yale of the Yale family, while their great-grandmother was Rachel Adams of Quincy, descendant of Henry Adams. Other Yale family members included Rev. Cyrus Yale, Capt. Theophilus Yale, abolitionist lawyer Barnabas Yale, paper manufacturer Wellington Smith, socialite Elizur Yale Smith, and Chicago railroad contractor Lucius P. Yale, who pioneered the construction of railroads in the West and built the Welland Canal.

The Yale family is known for having given their name to Yale University, while the Adams family is known for the two U.S. Presidents they have produced, John Adams and John Quincy Adams. In 1858, Gardner married Rosaline Lucretia Oviatt, daughter of General Orson Minott Oviatt and Lucretia Wood. In 1837, his family moved to Cleveland.

== Career ==
=== Business ===
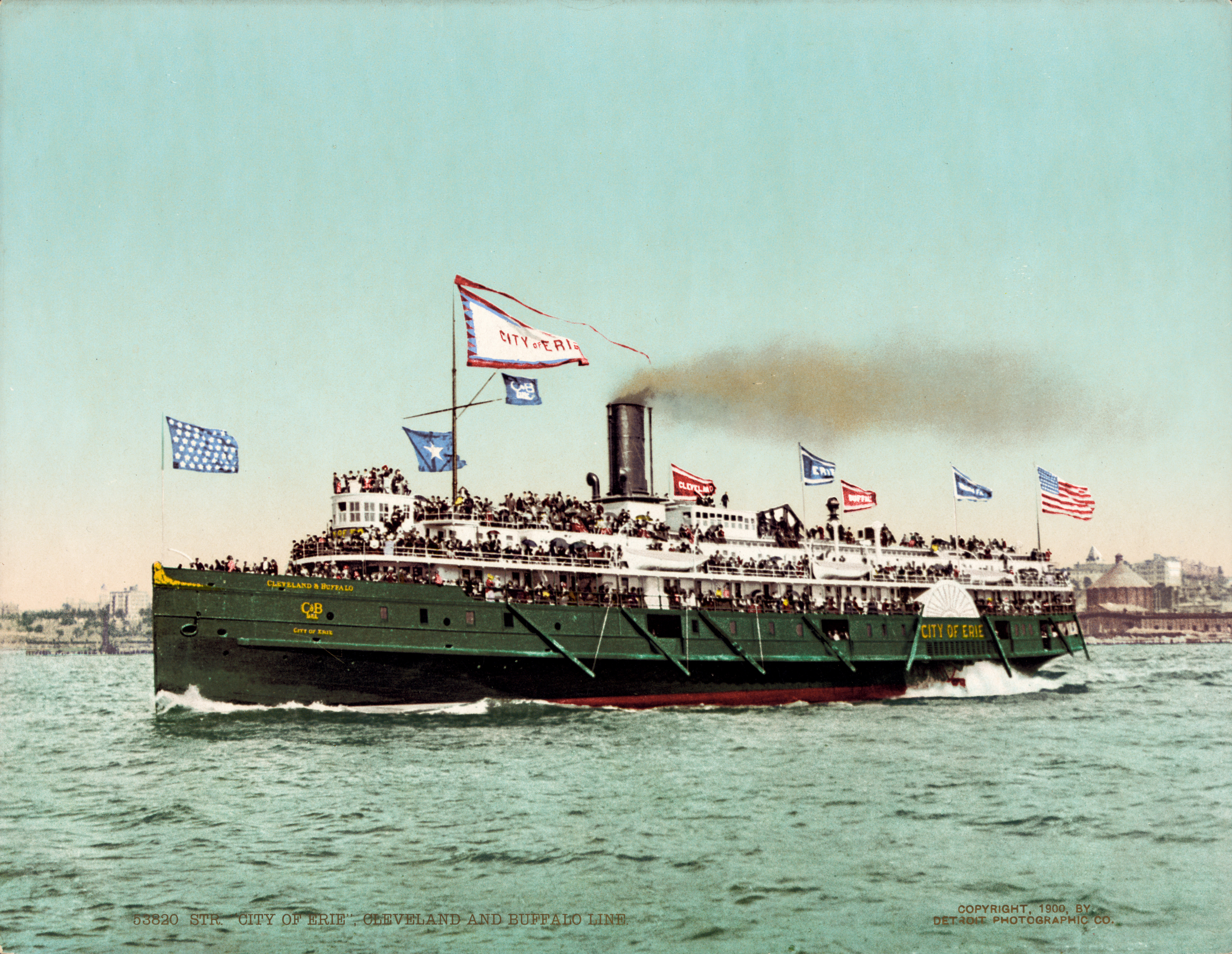
Steamer City of Erie, Cleveland and Buffalo Line

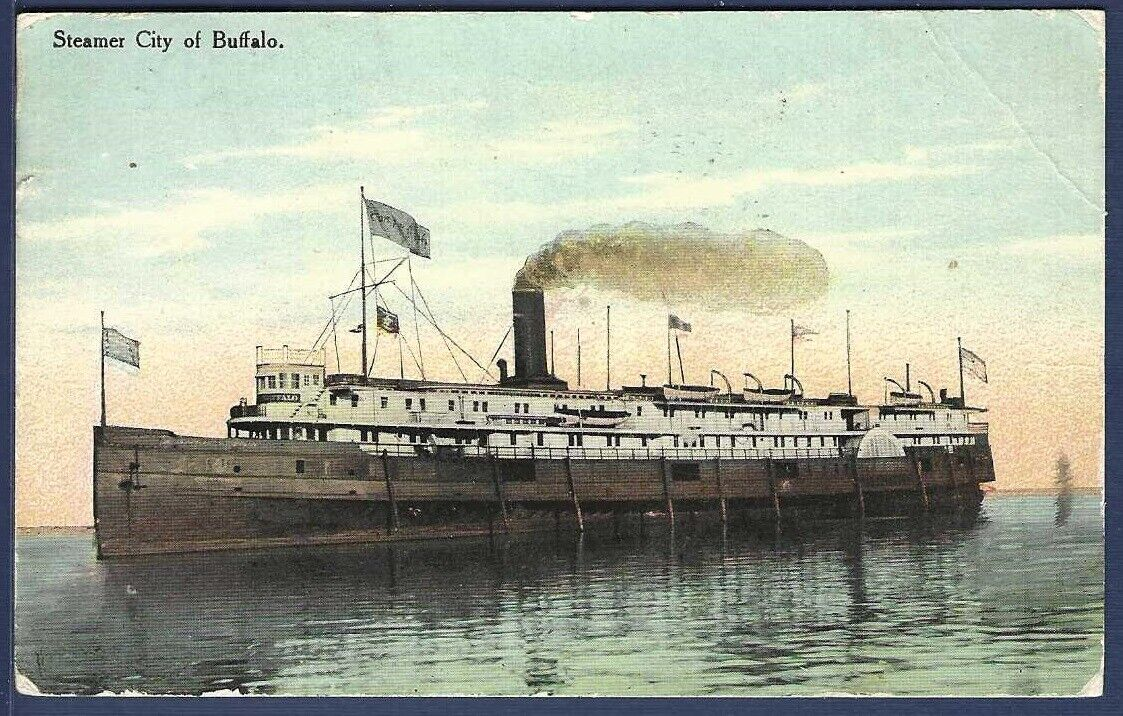
Steamer City of Buffalo

In the year 1858, Maurice B. Clark was looking to start a produce commission house in Cleveland on the Cleveland docks. As he was looking for partners, he convinced the young John D. Rockefeller to join the business with $1,000, which he got from his father, William Rockefeller Sr., and created the Clark & Rockefeller firm. As they needed capital and connections, George W. Gardner joined as well, coming from an old family background, in contrast to the other two partners.

In April 1858, they formed the business under Clark, Gardner & Company, owned together as three partners but without Rockefeller's name, as his name was not known enough to be useful to attract business, something Rockefeller was very displeased with.

It would become a pattern in his life, staying out of the spotlight and focus on wealth-building and concealing his wealth. Rockefeller was in charge of the finances and accounting, Gardner and Clark were in charge of buying and selling.

They made $500,000 in sales the first year, each of them making $2,200 in profits. As the business grew rapidly, they needed more capital, and Rockefeller was sent to a local bank to obtain a loan. After obtaining the loan, the young Rockefeller was stunned with the easiness of the process, having obtained $2,000, and said : " I felt that I was now a man of importance in the community". They became the largest grain dealers in Cleveland.

Among the three partners, there were frictions between Gardner and the young junior partner, as Gardner liked mixing business and pleasure while Rockefeller craved for savings. Gardner had just acquired a yacht with 3 friends, and he invited Rockefeller to be among them.

"John, we're going for a sail, come along," said Gardner, "get your mind off business for a while", to which John replied, "George Gardner, you are the most extravagant young man I ever knew. You are just barely getting a start in life, and yet you own an interest in a yacht... Everybody will be looking on you as a spendthrift and the first thing you know you'll be wrecking our business. No, I won't go on your yacht, I don't ever want to see it !", to which Gardner replied, "All right, John. I see there are certain things on which you and I probably never will agree... you like money beyond all else in the world, and I don't."

As the temperament of Gardner contrasted too much with Clark and Rockefeller, Gardner withdrew from the business following the second year of the American Civil War around December 1, 1862.

Clark, Gardner & Company continued business under the new name of Clark & Rockefeller, seated at one of their previous warehouses, and they entered the oil business. The business later became Rockefeller, Andrews & Flagler, and thereafter, the Standard Oil Company, which made John D. Rockefeller the richest man in the world. At the time, Cleveland was among the largest oil refining centers in the country.

Gardner also helped establish the Cleveland Board of Trade and acquired a large fleet of commercial and pleasure vessels. He helped to organize the Cleveland and Buffalo Transit line of side-wheel steamers, including the new steamers City of Buffalo and the City of Erie, the largests in the city. He became vice-president of the Cleveland & Buffalo Transit Co, and president of the Saegerton Mineral Springs Company.

=== Politics ===
Gardner was an active Republican politician, serving as a city councilman from 1863 to 1864 and 1876–1881. He served as the mayor of Cleveland for two non-consecutive two-year terms, from 1885 to 1886, and later 1889–1890. In 1886, he established Cleveland's Civil Service. Senator Mark Hanna, nicknamed the "king maker" for having made William McKinley president, was an intimate associate and friend, supporting him in his political career as the chairman of the Republicans.

He was also a large dealer in grain and flour, and became President of the City Council of Cleveland, as well as President of the Board of Trustees of the Ohio Reform School.

== Personal life and death ==
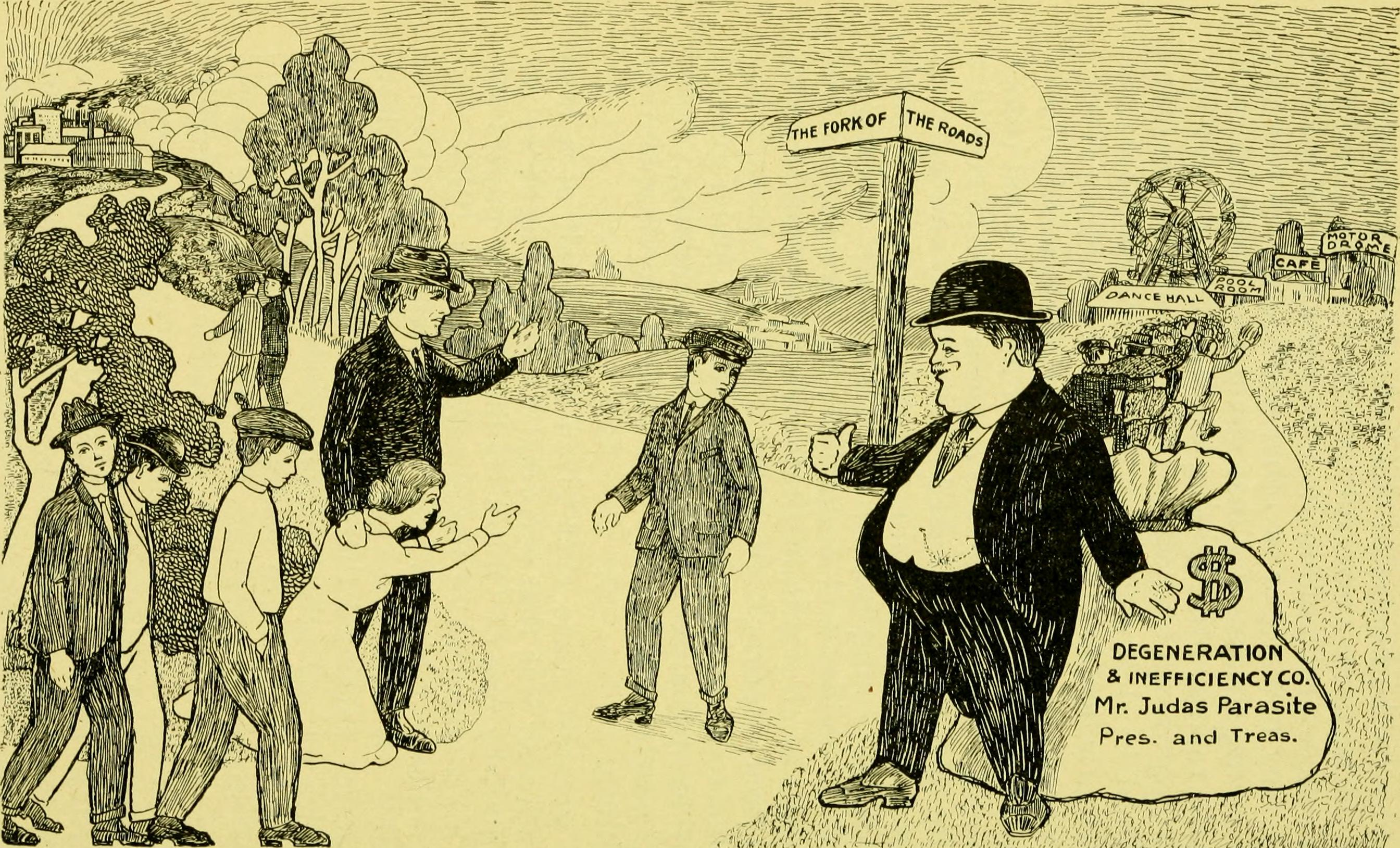
The efficient man, 1914, from Gardner Printing Co., Cleveland

In 1879, Gardner became a founding member of the Cleveland Yacht Club and was made its Commodore. He purchased the yacht Wasp. He brought the sloop yacht Rowena from Long Island Sound to Cleveland in 1861, and the big schooner yacht Priscilla from New York to Cleveland in 1895. He also owned the steamyacht Rosaline in 1876, and was made the first commodore of the Inter-Lake Yachting Association.

With his wife Rosaline L. Oviatt, daughter of General Orson Minott Oviatt, they had many children. Their son George Henry Gardner, president of Gardner Printing Co., married to Alice Louise Huntington. Mrs. Huntington was the granddaughter of Dr. Huntington, son-in-law of Congressman Zephaniah Swift, the Chief Justice of Connecticut.

He was also Secretary to Founding Father Oliver Ellsworth under President John Adams, and was among those chosen to be at the Treaty of Mortefontaine, involving negotiations with King Joseph Bonaparte, the older brother of Napoleon. George H. Gardner's enterprise was one of the largest printing plants in Ohio, and he was also president of the Iron Trade Review Company, and secretary and treasurer of the Cleveland Printing & Publishing Co.

Another son named Burt, a resident of Chicago, became the western editor of the Iron Trade Review, and James became secretary of the Saegertown Mineral Springs Company. Gardner died in Dayton, Ohio on December 18, 1911. He was buried at the Woodland Cemetery in Cleveland.

Political offices
Preceded by John H. Farley	Mayor of Cleveland; 1885–1886	Succeeded by Brenton D. Babcock
Preceded by Brenton D. Babcock	Mayor of Cleveland; 1889–1890	Succeeded by William G. Rose
