= Jimmy Rice =

Jimmy Rice may refer to:

- Jimmy Ryce (1985–1995), American crime victim

== See also ==
- James Rice (disambiguation)
