= Anson Smyth =

Presbyterian minister and father of the Cleveland Public Library

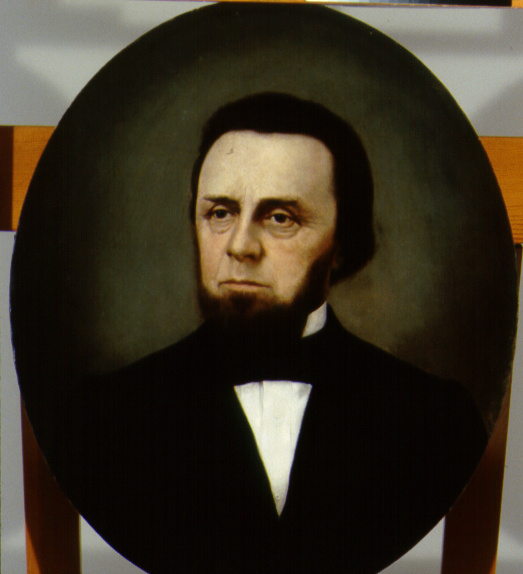
Portrait of Anson Smyth

Anson Smyth (1812 – 1887) was an American Presbyterian minister and educator from Cleveland, Ohio. He worked with Senator Harvey Rice to reform Ohio's school system, and became the "Father of the Cleveland Public Library" through his efforts in the legislature.

== Biography ==
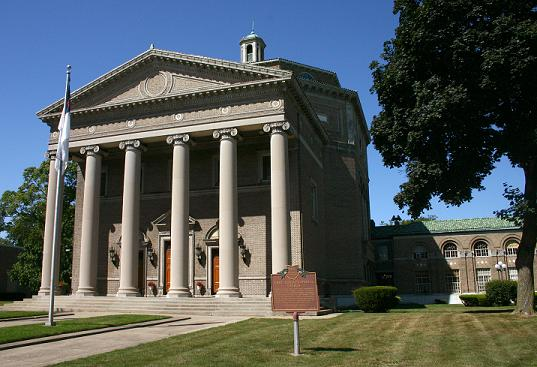
First Congregational Church of Toledo, Ohio

Anson Smyth was born in Franklin, Pennsylvania, and attended Milan Academy, as well as Williams College, Massachusetts, in the class of 1839. He then started teaching for a few years, and went thereafter to Yale College, where he graduated in theology from Yale Divinity School. After graduating, he first settled in Orange, Connecticut, where he was pastor.

He then became an early pastor and missionary in Michigan around 1845, and worked at the Congregational Church of Toledo, Ohio. He was made superintendent of the Toledo public schools, and later, the State Commissioner of the Common Schools of Ohio from 1856 to 1862.

He was put in charge of reforming the school system, and visited number of schools in every county of the state of Ohio. He worked with Senator Harvey Rice and other educators to restore Ohio's public schools. In 1861, he is recorded writing a recommendation letter to president Abraham Lincoln while being the State Commissioner.

He arrived in Cleveland in 1863, and was made superintendent of the Cleveland Metropolitan School District from 1863 to 1866. He was then involved with the creation of 10 primary and secondary schools in the state during his office. In 1867, Smyth played a leading role in creating the Cleveland Public Library, mainly through his efforts in the legislature.

He helped pass an act authorizing the support of libraries through taxation, which gave him the nickname of "Father of the Cleveland Public Library". In 1872, he became the first pastor of the North Presbyterian Church of Cleveland, and remained there for two years until his retirement.

Smyth became a writer in the New York Evangelist and other religious newspapers. He was also editor of the Ohio Educational Journal and the Educational Monthly newspaper.

Smyth died in Cleveland in 1887, at 75 years old. With his wife Caroline, he had 3 children, being George, William and Sarah Smyth. He was buried at Woodland Cemetery in Cleveland. His son William also became a reverend and worked at the library in Cleveland.
