= First Presbyterian Church of Blissfield =

Historic church in Michigan, United States

- U.S. National Register of Historic Places
- Michigan State Historic Site
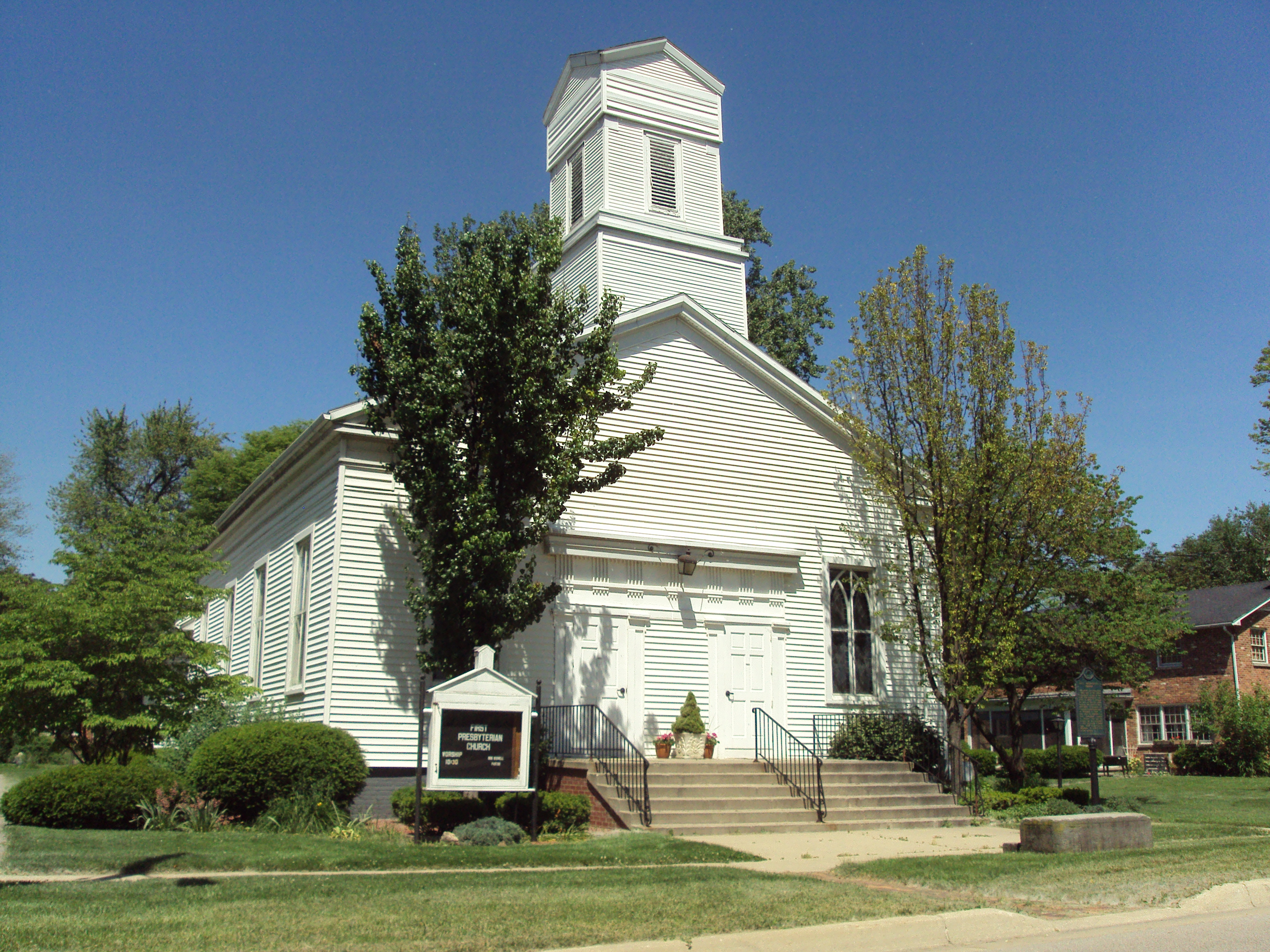

- Location within Michigan Location within the United States
- Interactive map
- Location: 306 Franklin Street; Blissfield, Michigan
- Coordinates: 41°50′08″N 83°52′2″W
- Built: 1849
- Architectural style: Greek Revival
- NRHP reference No.: 71000403

Significant dates
- Added to NRHP: September 3, 1971
- Designated MSHS: June 11, 1965

The First Presbyterian Church of Blissfield is an active church building located at 306 Franklin Street in the village of Blissfield in Blissfield Township in eastern Lenawee County, Michigan. It was designated as a Michigan State Historic Site on June 11, 1965 and was later added to the National Register of Historic Places on September 3, 1971. It was the second property in the county listed on the National Register after the Walker Tavern.

The congregation in Blissfield, which was formally organized on February 29, 1829, is one of the oldest Presbyterian congregations in the state. The church originally held services in the home of Hervey Bliss, one of the village founders, and later in a schoolhouse. The current Greek Revival church was constructed in 1849 at a cost of $2,800 under the ministry of Reverend John Monteith, who was a graduate from the Princeton Theological Seminary. Monteith, along with Gabriel Richard, co-founded what would later become the University of Michigan. Monteith served as the university's unofficial first president from 1817–1821 after having moved to the Michigan Territory in 1816. He would later move to Blissfield and preach from 1845–1855. During that time, he headed the funding for the construction of the church. The building is the fifth oldest operating Presbyterian church in the state of Michigan and the oldest church in Blissfield.

In 1883, the building itself was moved slightly to its current position just north of U.S. Route 223 near the River Raisin. In 1953, a large addition was added to the church, which greatly changed the appearance of the original church structure.
