= Nahum Ball Gates =

Colonel from Lorain County, Ohio

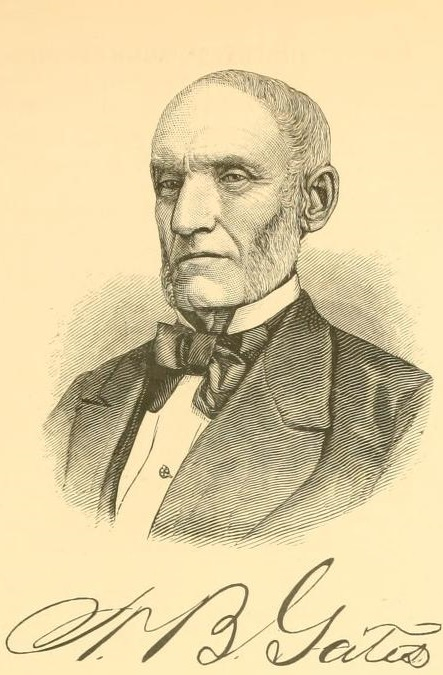
Portrait of Colonel Nahum Ball Gates, son-in-law of abolitionist Rev. John Monteith, cofounder of the University of Michigan

Colonel Nahum Ball Gates (1812–1890) was an American military officer, politician and businessman from Lorain County, Ohio. He became mayor of Elyria, Ohio, and was elected its sheriff and justice of the peace. He was also president of Lorain County Agricultural Society, and was appointed collector of Internal Revenue for the 14th District of Ohio by President Abraham Lincoln.

== Biography ==
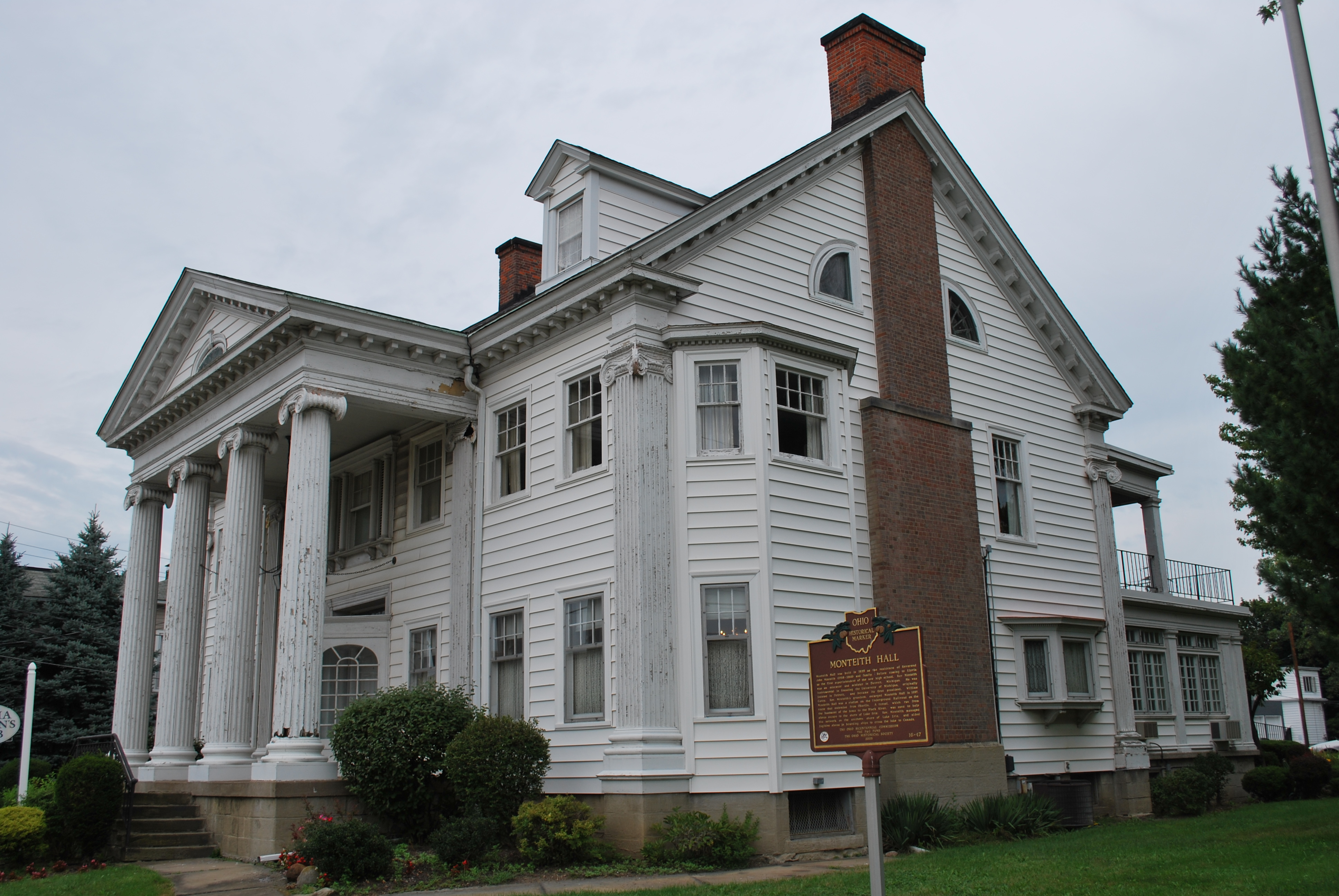
Monteith Hall, Elyria, Ohio, childhood home of his wife

Nahum Ball Gates was born in St. Alban's, Vermont, on September 28, 1812, to Capt. John Gates and Abigal Ball. His family came from Massachusetts initially. They were Puritans who participated in the American War of Independence, and were discharged by Founding Father Gen. Henry Knox. Gates had three brothers who served in the war. Gates was educated at local district schools during his youth. In 1835, he opened a general assortment store under Gates & Greene. He then entered into a partnership with his brother, Horatio N. Gates, from 1836 to 1844, in the commission business. In 1838, Gates was elected Sheriff of Lorain County, Ohio. He then moved to Elyria, Ohio.

He was made Constable of the city, as well as Justice of the Peace, and Marshal of Charlestown village. In 1840, he was re-elected sheriff, and served four years, reaching the constitutional limit. On May 12, 1841, Gates married Sarah S. Monteith, daughter of abolitionist Rev. John Monteith. The reverend's house was used as a stop of the Underground Railroad at the time, where he helped enslaved people escape the country and obtain their freedom. They had number of children, one of which was Charlotte Augusta, who married to Rev. Theodore Yale Gardner, brother of Cleveland mayor George W. Gardner.

In 1843, Gates was elected mayor of Elyria, and stayed for about 12 years. In the same year, Gates acquired a mill on the Black River, and built a saw-mill, sash, door, and blind factory. He stayed in business for 23 years. In 1844, Gates became engaged in the general merchandise business in Elyria, which he exited in 1845. In 1850, he became Director of the Lorain Plank-Road Company, and was made its superintendent. He became a member of the Board of Education, and stayed in his position for about 25 years.

In 1852, Gates was elected president of the Lorain County Agricultural Society, which was founded in 1845. He inclosed grounds for the society, and built stables, pens, sheds, and other structures. In 1856, he was appointed treasurer of Lorain County, replacing Caleb S. Goodwin. In 1860, he became coroner of Lorain County. In 1862, he was appointed collector of internal revenue for the 14th district, being nominated by president Abraham Lincoln. He would later be removed from his office by president Andrew Johnson. In 1869, he acquired a soap factory.

He stayed active in the Republican party, and a member of the "Wide-awake Club". He devoted a day in 1885 in homage to the death of Gen. Ulysses S. Grant. He was also among the founders and active workers of the Elyria Union School. Col. Nahum Ball Gates died in 1890. His son, William N. Gates, would establish the third oldest advertising agency in the United States, being W. N. Gates & Co., and become a trustee of the Cleveland Trust Co. and the Cleveland & Eastern Railway.
