= John Monteith (minister) =

American Presbyterian minister, educator and abolitionist

The Reverend John Monteith
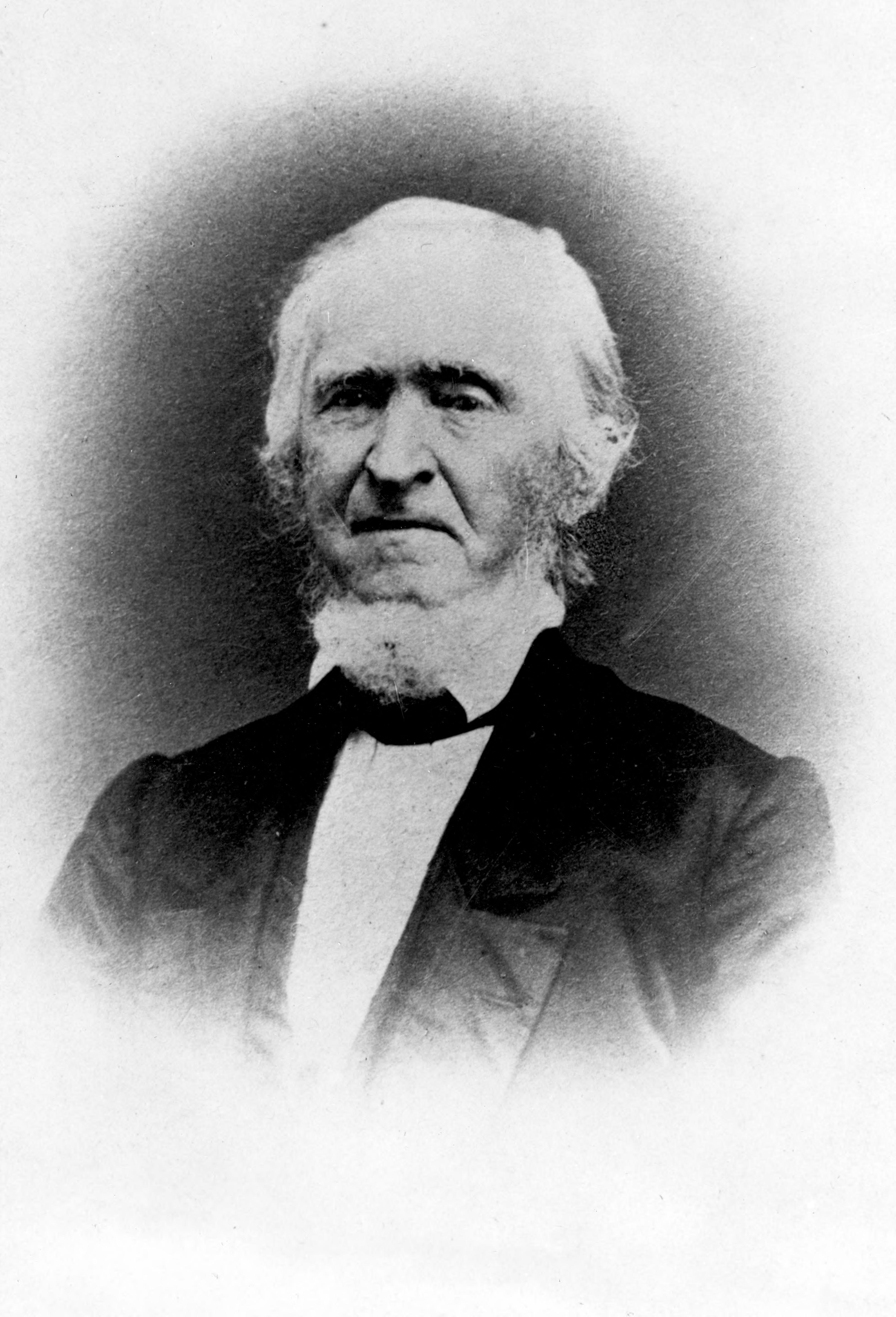

President of the University of Michigania
- In office 1817–1821
- Preceded by: Office established
- Succeeded by: Office abolished, next held by Henry Philip Tappan

Principal of Elyria High School
- In office 1832–1833

Principal of Cambridge Washington Academy
- In office 1830–1832

Personal details
- Born: August 5, 1788 Gettysburg, Pennsylvania, U.S.
- Died: April 5, 1868 (aged 79) Elyria, Ohio, U.S.
- Spouses: Sarah Sophia Granger; Abigail Harris
- Children: Sarah Sophia; Mary Harris; Charles Alexander; Elizabeth Hamilton; John, Jr.; Abigail; George; Edwin Harris; Arthur
- Parent(s): Daniel Monteith and Sarah Lecky
- Education: Jefferson College (BA); Princeton Theological Seminary

Ecclesiastical career
- Religion: Presbyterian
- Ordained: May 1817
- Congregations: First Protestant Society of Detroit; First Presbyterian Church of Monroe; First Presbyterian Church of Blissfield

Academic work
- Discipline: Theology, Classics
- Institutions: University of Michigan; Hamilton College; Lafayette College; Oberlin College; Elyria High School

John Monteith (August 5, 1788 – April 5, 1868) was an American Presbyterian minister, educator, and was the historical first president of the University of Michigan.

Monteith was born near Gettysburg, Pennsylvania, in 1788. He received his formal education at Jefferson College and worked as a schoolteacher in Cumberland, Maryland. He later continued his education at Princeton Theological Seminary and was licensed as a Presbyterian missionary in 1816. He was proficient in French and Latin and had knowledge of Hebrew and Greek, which facilitated his missionary work.

In 1817, at the behest of Augustus B. Woodward, Chief Justice of the Michigan Territory, Monteith became the president of the Catholepistemiad (now the University of Michigan), an entity created by an Act to reorganize the territory's education. He served from 1817 to 1821 before leaving Detroit for a professorship at Hamilton College. During his time in Detroit, he organized the First Protestant Society of Detroit in 1818, which initially served all Protestants in the city, including Presbyterians, Methodists, Episcopalians, and Baptists, before they separated to form their own congregations. In 1825, the remaining members of the Society established the First Presbyterian Church of Detroit. In 1820, he founded the First Presbyterian Church in Monroe, Michigan.

== Early life and education ==
John Monteith was born August 4, 1788, on a farm in the vicinity of what is now Gettysburg, Pennsylvania, but which was then Straban twp., York Co., Pennsylvania. About 1805, the family moved to Coitsville in northeast Ohio, to a farm close enough to the state line that the family regularly attended church in New Bedford, Pennsylvania, in the Hopewell Congregation. According to his diary, his father's health was feeble, and so John worked at farming to support the family. Nevertheless, at age twenty, under the guidance of his pastor, William Wick, Monteith began to study Latin grammar and to educate himself in the hours not devoted to agriculture. He soon started his formal education at Jefferson College in Canonsburg, Pennsylvania, and graduated with a BA in 1813.

After a short stint as a schoolteacher in Cumberland, Maryland, he continued his education at Princeton Theological Seminary which had opened in 1812 with one professor and only a dozen students. There he lived in the home of the president, Archibald Alexander, and tutored Alexander's young sons, James Waddel Alexander, William Cowper Alexander and Joseph Addison Alexander. By the time he graduated in 1816, he could write in French and Latin and knew Hebrew and Greek. When Alexander received a plea from the frontier outpost of Detroit for a minister from Lewis Cass and Henry Jackson Hunt, he suggested Monteith should accept the offer. Monteith was licensed as a Presbyterian missionary in spring of 1816 and set out for Detroit.

== Detroit, Michigan Territory ==
=== Arrival ===
On June 25, 1816, Monteith disembarked at Detroit from the schooner he had boarded forty hours earlier at Buffalo. In addition to the fifteen hundred soldiers housed at Fort Shelby, his new home had a population of about nine hundred souls, over half of whom were French Catholics. Monteith had been called to serve the Protestant portion of the population and five days after his arrival, he preached his first sermon at the Council House. Although he had been licensed to preach, no church organization was yet contemplated, because Monteith had not yet been ordained as a full-fledged minister of the gospel.

=== The City Library of Detroit ===
In March 1817, Monteith helped to organize the City Library of Detroit, a proprietary library which was open to anyone who could afford to buy a $5 share. Monteith wrote the constitution and became the institution's first librarian. Several of the town's prominent citizens bought more than one share, and by April 6 when Monteith set off on horseback for New York, he had collected $450 to use to purchase books in the east. The three hundred volumes he purchased were consigned for transport to Detroit, and had arrived safely by July 25, when the first issue of the Detroit Gazette announced their arrival.

=== The Catholopistemiad or University of Michigania ===
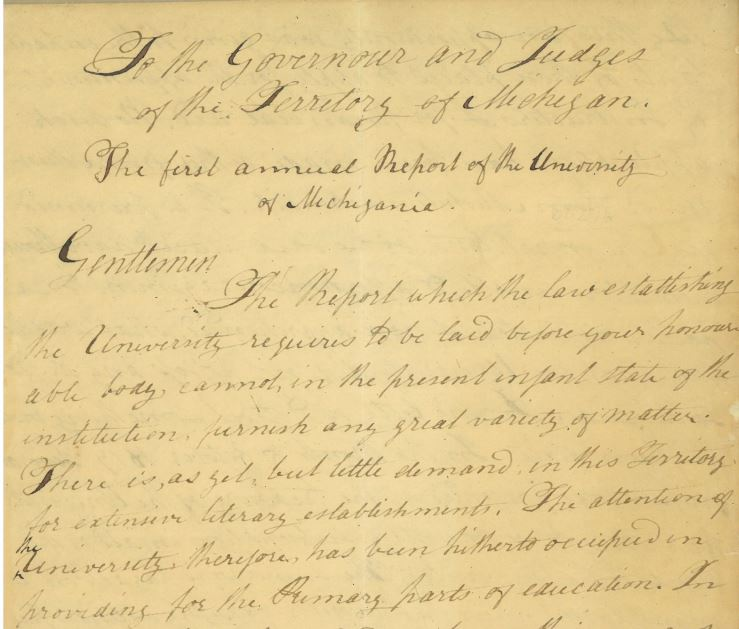
First Annual Report of the University of Michigania, authored by John Monteith, November 16, 1818

Returning to Detroit, on August 20, 1817, Monteith was summoned to the quarters of Augustus Brevoort Woodward for "an interview on the subject of a university". Six days later, the plan for the university was legally established by action of the territory's executive and judicial officers who comprised Michigan's legislature. Under the plan, the Catholepistimiad, or University of Michigania, was to be established with professorships in thirteen fields of human knowledge: literature, mathematics, natural history, natural philosophy, astronomy, chemistry, medicine, economics, ethics, military science, history, intellectual science, and universal science. Initially, John Monteith was to hold seven of the professorships, and Gabriel Richard, a Catholic priest, was to hold the other six. In addition, Monteith was to serve as the university's president and Richard would be its vice president.

The university's officers had authority over all institutions of public education in the Michigan Territory including colleges, schools, libraries, and museums. The cornerstone of the first building, commonly called "the Academy", was laid in Detroit on September 24, 1817. By August 1818, a teacher named Lemuel Shattuck was able to open his Lancastrian School in the lower story. So far as is known, no collegiate students were matriculated under Monteith's presidency and thus his duties as president consisted mainly of making plans and helping to raise funds. On April 30, 1821, a new act was passed, changing the name to the University of Michigan, and abolishing the office of president in favor of a board of twenty trustees. Although Monteith was offered the chairmanship, he soon left to accept a professorship at Hamilton College in Clinton, New York. It would not be until 1837, sixteen years after Monteith had left Detroit, that classes would first be organized at the university's new home in Ann Arbor, Michigan. Nevertheless, the entity formed in 1817 is the direct legal antecedent to today's University of Michigan.

=== Religious institutions in Michigan ===
On May 12, 1817, while on his trip east to buy books for the library, Monteith was ordained by the Presbytery of New Brunswick, his former professor Archibald Alexander leading the charge. Now fully authorized to conduct marriages, baptize and perform communion, he organized the First Protestant Society of Detroit on March 27, 1818. At first, this society served all Protestants in the city—Presbyterians, Methodists, Episcopalians, Baptists, etc. Gradually, as each denomination gathered strength, it broke away to form its own congregation—the Methodists in 1818, the Episcopalians in 1824. In 1825, the remaining members of the Society formed the First Presbyterian Church of Detroit.

In the year the First Protestant Society was founded, a recession caused the financial support for Detroit's new institutions to falter, and so, in January 1819, Monteith again traveled to the east, this time to raise funds to build a place of worship. Travelling as far as Washington, D.C., and Charleston, South Carolina, he eventually cleared $1200 on the trip. The building was finished and dedicated on February 27, 1820. On January 20, 1820, he founded the First Presbyterian Church at Monroe, the oldest institution of its denomination in Michigan.

On June 7, 1820, Monteith married Sarah Sophia Granger of Portage, Ohio, a town not far from his father's farm in Coitsville. She contracted an epidemic fever while on a trip to visit her parents a mere fifteen weeks after the wedding, and died on October 9, 1820. When Monteith married a second time, on August 30, 1821, at Florence, Ohio, to Abigail Harris, he had already resigned his post at Detroit in order to take up the professorship of Latin and Greek at Hamilton College in Clinton, New York. From this union, eventually, nine children would be born. His daughter Sarah S. Monteith would marry to Colonel Nahum Ball Gates, the father-in-law of Theodore Yale Gardner.

== Hamilton College ==
During his tenure as Professor of Latin and Greek at Hamilton College, John Monteith played an important role in a religious feud that nearly destroyed the young institution. Hamilton had been chartered in 1812 and was the third institution of higher learning in New York after Columbia and Union College. In 1821, the entire faculty consisted of a president, three professors, and two tutors. Henry Davis, the president, belonged to the New Divinity school of theology, and believed in religious revivals. He did not, however, approve of Charles Grandison Finney and the particularly emotional revivals he led beginning in 1824.

Finney's base of operation was Whitesboro, a few miles from Hamilton College. Monteith soon became a devoted follower. Monteith responded to Davis's objection to the new preaching style by meeting with students and trustee Gerrit Smith and praying publicly from the pulpit, claiming that: "Thou knowest, O Lord that the faculty of Hamilton College have sinned in high places: and we pray Thee, O Lord, if they are obstacles to Thy work, that Thou wouldst remove them out of the way".

Amid controversy, John Monteith left Hamilton in the spring of 1828. The feud had had significant results for Hamilton College, reducing the number of students from 107 in the spring of 1823 to 9 in 1829, the year following Monteith's departure.

== Manual labor schools and abolitionism ==
=== Manual Labor Academy of Pennsylvania at Germantown ===
While at Hamilton College, Monteith had become enamored of the manual labor concept of education. George Washington Gale, a fellow alumnus of the Princeton Theological Seminary, was then living nearby, and had begun to read about New England manual labor schools modeled on those established by Philipp Emanuel von Fellenberg and Johann Heinrich Pestalozzi and by the Alsatian pastor J. F. Oberlin. Monteith observed first-hand Gale's new Oneida Manual Labor Institute at nearby Whitesboro.

When he left his position in New York, Monteith headed to Germantown outside Philadelphia, to organize the Manual Labor Academy of Pennsylvania. It commenced operation on May 1, 1829, with four students in his care, enrolling a total of twenty-five within six months. Under Monteith's guidance, students studied subjects such as mathematics, surveying, geography, and bookkeeping, and also engaged in "useful bodily labor" for three or four hours a day. Students gardened and farmed, built furniture and mended buildings. Students who could not otherwise afford to attend college were able to defray their expenses through their own labor. Unfortunately, the trustees were unable to meet the expenses of the purchase of the land through additional sale of stock, and the institution struggled financially.

A year after opening the new academy, Monteith's former Jefferson College classmate George Junkin joined him in Germantown. When Monteith resigned as principal of the academy, Junkin stayed on another year, and then moved the academy to Easton, Pennsylvania, where it became the foundation of the infant Lafayette College. Junkin became Lafayette's first president. Because of this circumstance, Lafayette claims that John Monteith was the college's first professor.

Between 1830 and 1832, Monteith was principal of the Cambridge Washington Academy, in Cambridge, New York, where his wife Abigail assisted as a teacher.

=== Elyria, Ohio, and Blissfield, Michigan ===
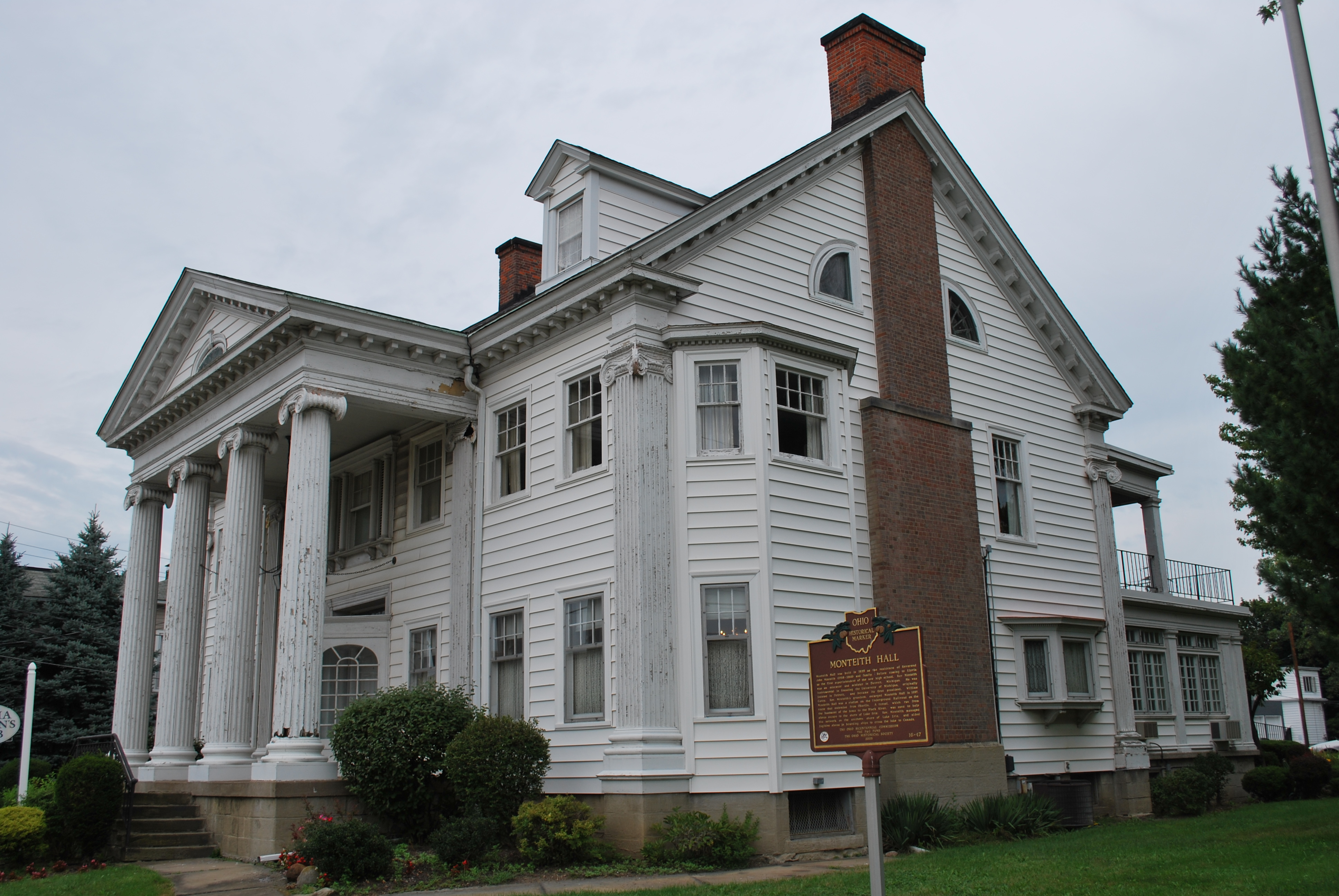
Monteith Hall, home of John Monteith

The manual labor movement gained an enormous boost when George Washington Gale convinced abolitionist-philanthropists Arthur and Lewis Tappan to finance the Society for Promoting Manual Labor in Literary Institutions. In July 1831 the Society hired Monteith's former Hamilton College student Theodore Dwight Weld as its field agent, who convinced Monteith to come to Elyria, Ohio.

Elyria is just nine miles north of Oberlin College, which would be founded two years after Monteith settled there, in 1833. Indeed, several members of the Finneyite faction of Hamilton College all gathered in the vicinity of Oberlin, where Monteith's former student, Asa Mahan (Hamilton, 1824), became its first president, Charles Grandison Finney himself accepted a professorship in 1835 and was the second president, and John Keep, a former Hamilton trustree, served as president of the board of trustees.

Monteith became the principal of the private Elyria High School in 1832, assisted by his wife. Among the students educated there were James Fairchild, third president of Oberlin College and his brother Edward Henry Fairchild, first president of Berea College.

Soon after arriving in Elyria, Monteith became an ardent abolitionist. On December 4, 1833, he attended the first convention of the American Anti-Slavery Society at Philadelphia, led by the Tappan brothers as one of eight Ohio delegates. He was one of the founders of the Western Reserve Anti-Slavery Society, which was formed on the principle of total and immediate emancipation in 1833 and in 1835 was the president of the Lorain County Anti-Slavery Society.

According to his son, John Monteith, Jr., "He made no apologies, and used no conciliatory or rhetorical blandishments. He poured out the red facts and hammered them in with his hard faced logic. The whole community came down on him. With the exception of two or three kindred spirits, there was throughout the whole Reserve scarcely a man or woman that dared to be his friend. Persecution started up on every side, and the very air was filled with biting slanders."

In 1845, he accepted a call to lead the First Presbyterian Church in Blissfield, Michigan. He labored there for ten years, returning to Elyria to live with his married daughter in 1855. On April 5, 1868, at the age of 79, he was laid to rest. His home in Elyria, Ohio, Monteith Hall, now on the National Register of Historic Places, was a stop on the Underground Railroad.

== Historical legacy ==
Several institutions were named in Monteith's honor: Monteith College (defunct since 1981) at Wayne State University, the Monteith Memorial Presbyterian Church of Detroit (defunct since 1991), the Monteith Branch of the Detroit Public Library, Monteith Elementary School in Grosse Pointe Woods, John Monteith Elementary School in Drayton Plains, Michigan and the Monteith Library (now renamed the Kehrl Building) at Alma College. At the University of Michigan, the John Monteith Legacy Society recognizes donors who include the university in their estate plan.

Academic offices
New title University of Michigania founded	President of the University of Michigania; 1817–1821	Vacant Office abolished until 1850 Title next held by Henry Philip Tappan as President of the University of Michigan
