= Brenton D. Babcock =

American politician (1830–1906)

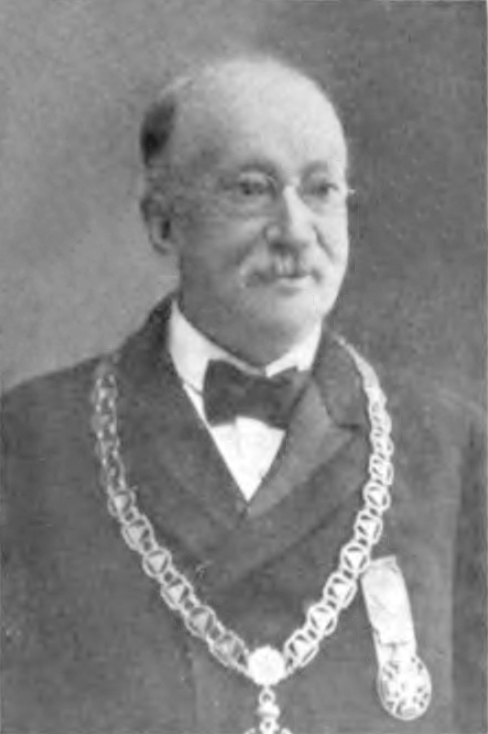

29th Mayor of Cleveland
- In office 1887–1888
- Preceded by: George W. Gardner
- Succeeded by: George W. Gardner

Personal details
- Born: October 2, 1830 Adams, New York
- Died: January 6, 1906 (aged 75) Cleveland, Ohio
- Party: Democratic
- Spouse: Elizabeth Smith (m. 1867)

Brenton D. Babcock (October 2, 1830 – January 6, 1906) was an American politician who served as the 29th mayor of Cleveland. As a Democrat, he was elected in 1886, serving from 1887 to 1888.

== Early life ==
Babcock was born on October 2, 1830, in Adams, New York, to William and Elvira Babcock.

== Career ==
Babcock became a clerk for the Erie Railroad in 1855, in Buffalo, New York. In 1865, he moved to Cleveland, working for Cross, Payne & Co, a coal dealership.

=== Politics ===
Babcock was the Democratic Party's nominee for the mayor of Cleveland in 1886. He defeated the Republican nominee Wm. M. Bayne to win election to a two-year term, serving from 1887 to 1888.

== Personal life and death ==
Babcock was a Mason who was elected high priest of the Ohio lodge in 1898. He died suddenly of apoplexy in January 1906, which some of his peers ascribed to a stock market downturn. In his memory, the local Masonic lodge was renamed the Brenton D. Babcock F. & A. M. Lodge.

Political offices
Preceded by George W. Gardner	Mayor of Cleveland; 1887–1888	Succeeded by George W. Gardner
