= Orson Minott Oviatt =

American general and postmaster (1799–1869)

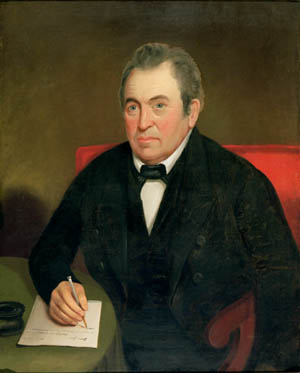
Painting of General Orson Minott Oviatt's father, Col. Heman Oviatt Sr., Hudson, Ohio

General Orson Minott Oviatt (1799 – 1869) was a wealthy merchant, abolitionist, politician and military officer from Richfield, Ohio. He was the city postmaster for many years, county commissioner, and the cofounder the Academic Institution of Richfield. He gave land to the city and became the namesake of Oviatt-Newton Park. He was also the father-in-law of the Mayor of Cleveland, George W. Gardner, an early business partner of John D. Rockefeller.

== Early life ==
Orson Minott Oviatt was born on February 24, 1799, to Eunice Newton and Col. Heman Oviatt, a family of French origin. His father was a wealthy merchant and one of the original settlers of Hudson, Ohio, with pioneer David Hudson. He became the first Mayor of Hudson and a board director of Western Reserve College. Oviatt was a cousin of Col. Morris Benjamin Oviatt, and Mason Oviatt, who built the Oviatt House used as a station of the Underground Railroad.

== Biography ==
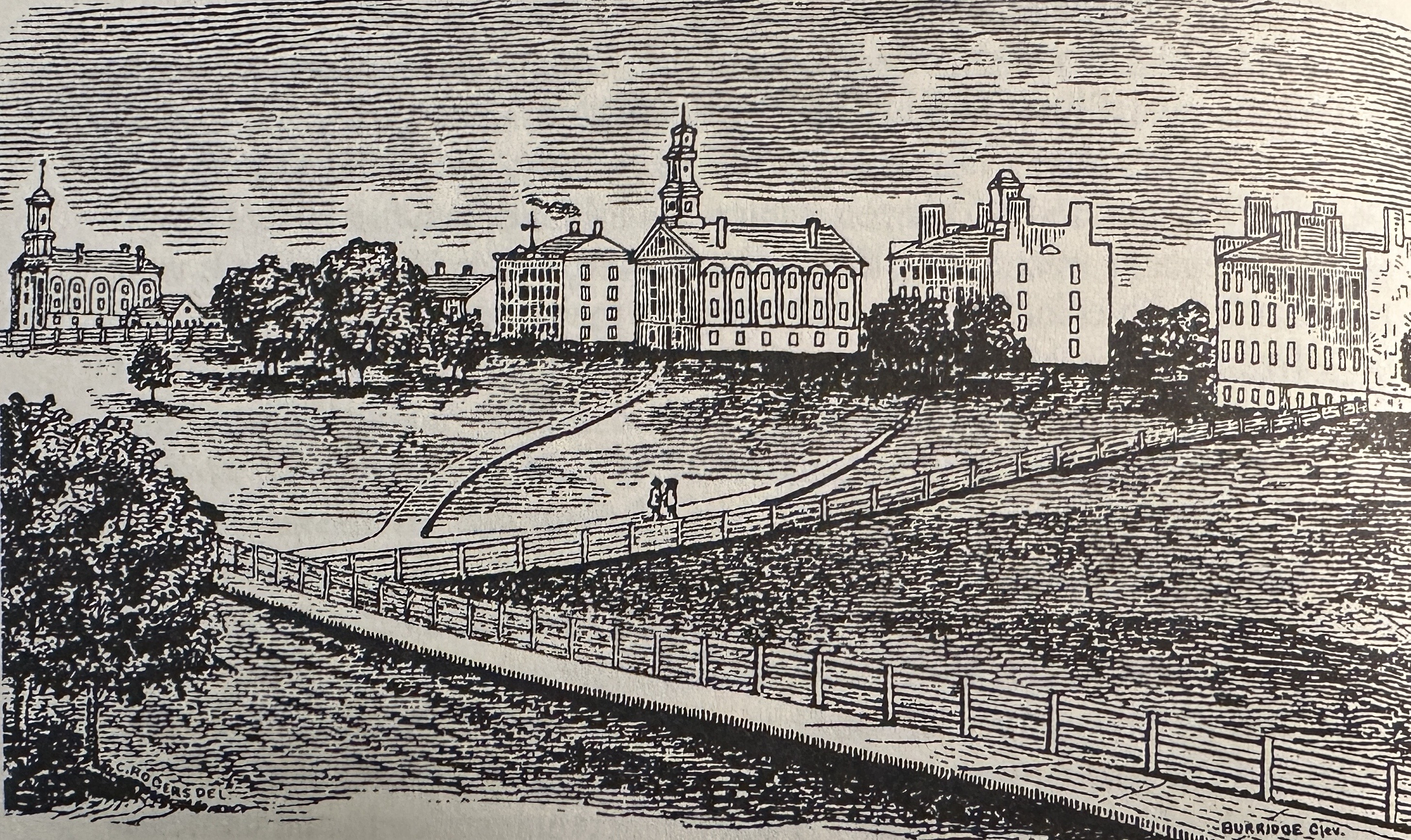
The Western Reserve College, in Hudson, Ohio, 1856

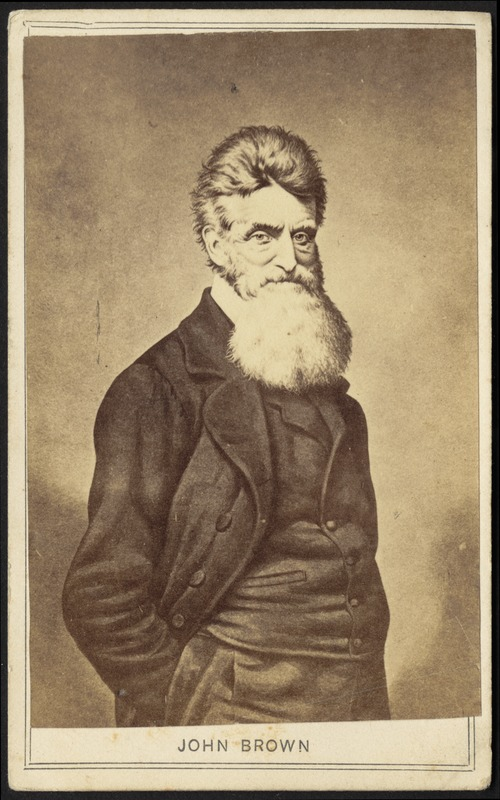
Abolitionist John Brown, old friend and correspondent of Gen. Oviatt

Oviatt attended Moses Hallock's school during his youth, along with John Brown and his brother. They then studied under the auspices of Vaill and Reverend William R. Weeks, the headmaster, and at Litchfield Academy in Connecticut. Oviatt became associated with the Chippewa Indians in Connecticut, where his father had a small store, and learned to speak their language. He arrived in Richfield, Ohio, around 1820 and built a house and a store. His enterprise, Oviatt & Porter Co., would become the trading center of the city for over 50 years.

His store would also become the first store in the city as well as its first post office. One of Oviatt's worker who worked at his 4,000 acres family farm was reformer John Brown, one of the future leaders of the American abolitionist movement, who was a friend of the Oviatt family. Oviatt is also recorded making an agreement with John Brown, and being one of his correspondents during the 1840s. He was involved in the abolitionist cause with Brown. They were old friends and had been together in Connecticut, when Brown wanted to go to Amherst College and enter the ministry.

In 1825, 1829 and 1835, Oviatt was elected Postmaster of Richfield under Postmaster General William T. Barry. In 1830, Oviatt gave land for the building of the Congregational Church, which became the third church in the Western Reserve. In 1830, he was nominated as a candidate for the office of Senator for the upcoming elections, representing the counties of Cuyahoga, Lorrain and Medina, in the Ohio State Senate. In 1835, he was nominated with 4 others by the Ohio House of Representatives to establish an academic institution in the town of Richfield, Ohio.

They established its corporation and named it the Academic Institution of Richfield. In 1841, Oviatt and his wife Lucretia donated land to establish a public park in the city through the Congregational Society, which would later be renamed in their honor as the Oviatt-Newton Park. In 1842, Oviatt is re-elected as postmaster of Richfield. In 1845, he established with his wife the East Richfield Cemetery, also known as the Fairview Cemetery, though a land gift to the First Congregational Society.

In 1847, he entered into a partnership with the son of Capt. Tomlinson, dealing in livestock. While the partners split about a year later, Oviatt would become a wealthy merchant in Richfield, and have large businesses in Cleveland.

== Family life ==
Orviatt was married to Lucretia Ward, granddaughter of Rev. Ephraim Ward of the Ephraim Ward House in Massachusetts. They had five children: Eunice Newton, Minott Orson, Henry and Louis. Their daughter Rosaline married to mayor George W. Gardner, brother of Rev. Theodore Yale Gardner, members of the Yale family. His son, Col. Minott Oviatt Jr., became County Commissioner of Summit County, Ohio, and one of his granddaughters married an editor of The North American in Philadelphia.

His son was also one of the proprietors of the Akron Live Stock Association, owning a 20,000 acres ranch in New Mexico, with Oviatt as manager.

== Later life ==
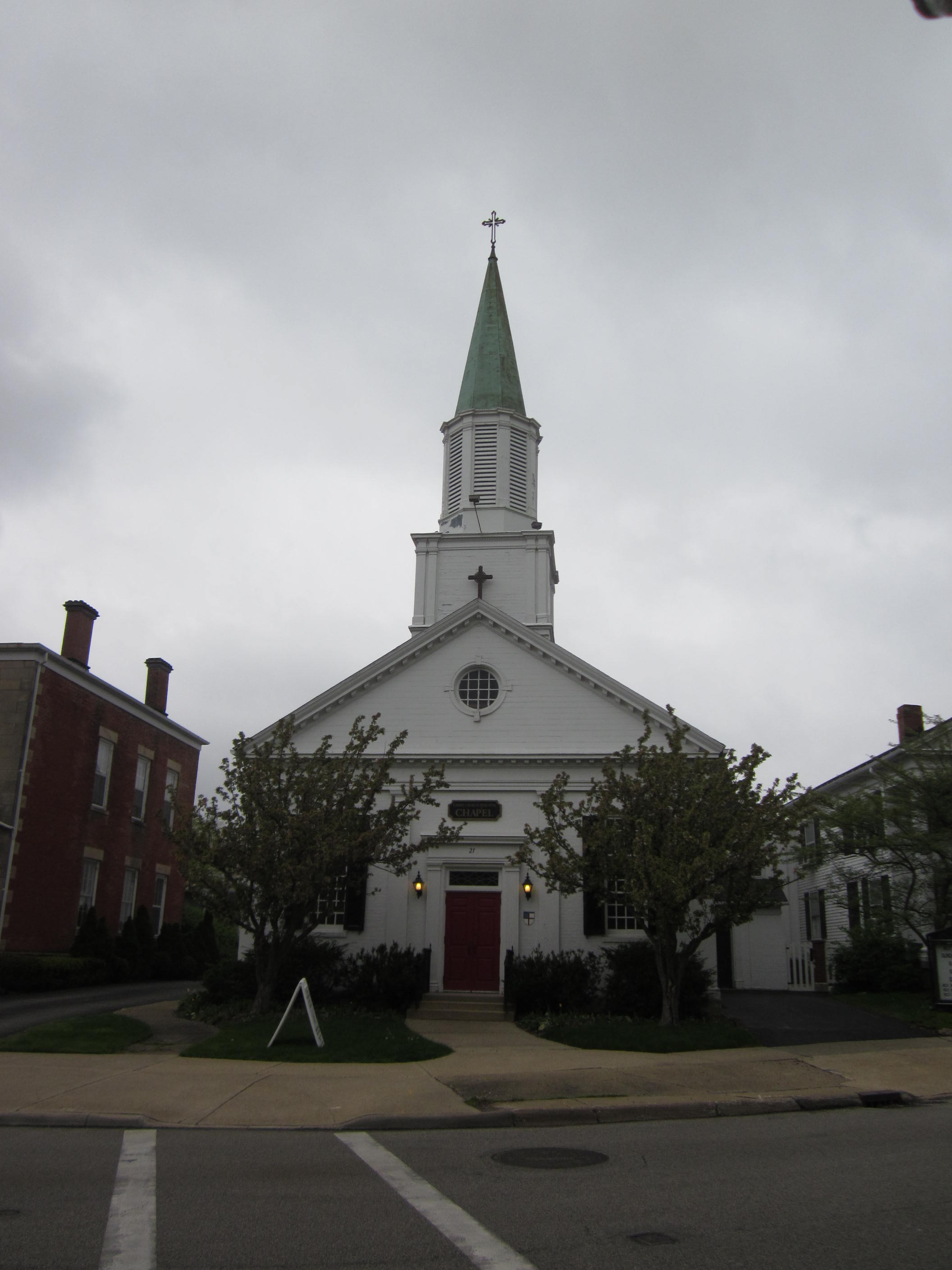
The church at Hudson, Ohio

Gen. Oviatt inherited from his father vast asheries, tanneries, and merchandise trade from the area, having a virtual monopoly over the region. Their 4,000 acres family estate, which covered most of the town of Richfield, Ohio, was obtained from their service during the American War of Independence. As they had previously lost their land in Connecticut to the British, they were awarded this new territory.

He served for two consecutive terms as County Commissioner of Summit County, Ohio, from 1868 to 1874. Gen. Orson M. Oviatt built in 1868 a mansion at 3758 Brecksville Road, in Richfield, Ohio, which later became the Richfield Historical Society. It is now part of the National Register of Historic Places listings in Summit County, Ohio.

He died on September 15, 1869, in Richfield, Ohio, and was buried at Woodland Cemetery in Cleveland.
