= James Rice =

James or Jim Rice may refer to:

== Arts and entertainment ==
- James Rice (writer) (1843–1882), English novelist
- L. James Rice (born 1968), American fantasy novelist
- Jim Rice (Survivor) (fl. 2011), American game show contestant
- Jim Rice, musician

== Law and politics ==
- James Montgomery Rice (1842–1912), American lawyer and politician
- Jim Rice (Minnesota politician) (1925–1996), American politician, Minnesota state representative
- James A. Rice (born 1957), American attorney, judge, and politician
- Jim Rice (Idaho politician), American politician, Idaho state senator

== Sports ==
- James Rice (cricketer) (fl. 1811–1813), English cricketer
- Jim Rice (motorcyclist) (born 1947), American motorcycle racer
- Jim Rice (born 1953), American baseball player

== Others ==
- James Louis Rice (1730–1793), Irish count of the Holy Roman Empire
- James Clay Rice (1829–1864), American Civil War Union general
- James O. Rice (fl. 1839), commanding officer of the Texas Rangers at the Battle of the San Gabriels
- James S. Rice (1846–1939), American businessman and rancher
- James R. Rice (born 1940), American geophysicist
- James Mahmud Rice (born 1972), Australian sociologist

== See also ==
- Jimmy Ryce
