= Tashmoo Park =

Amusement park in Algonac, Michigan (1897–1951)

- Interactive map of Tashmoo Park
- Location: Algonac, Michigan, United States
- Coordinates: 42.5795°N 82.5675°W
- Status: Defunct
- Opened: 1897
- Closed: 1951

Tashmoo Park was an amusement park in Algonac, Michigan. Opened in 1897, it closed in 1951. Most of it was later demolished, though the dance pavilion remains today, used by a marina to store recreational boats over the winter.

The park's name was given to the steamer Tashmoo and probably comes from Lake Tashmoo on Martha's Vineyard.

The park was located on Harsens Island in the St. Clair Flats at the northern end of Lake St. Clair. The St Clair Flats is the largest freshwater river delta in the world. Tashmoo Park offered visitors an escape from the oppressive heat and humidity of packed, sweltering Detroit in the summertime. Tashmoo Park had picnic tables, a baseball diamond, swings and rides, as well as a casino and a dancing pavilion. Some visitors swam in the St Clair River. Indians from nearby Walpole Island sold moccasins and beadwork.

The park was served by many steamships that travelled several times a day between Detroit and Port Huron, Michigan, delivering passengers and freight. This was during a time when automobiles were rare and roads few. However, the connecting waters of the Great Lakes made steamships travel almost like riding a bus, and up to 250,000 people visited Tashmoo Park in the summers during the 1890s and early 20th century. The most famous steamer was the Tashmoo, which stopped twice daily on trips between Detroit and Port Huron.

The park was revived to memory in June 2013 when Dave Leander took a dive in the St. Clair River and found a buried bottle with a message containing a reference to the park. The letter was dated June 30, 1915.
