= Henry Freeman Rice =

American businessman (1818–1877)

Henry Freeman “Harry” Rice
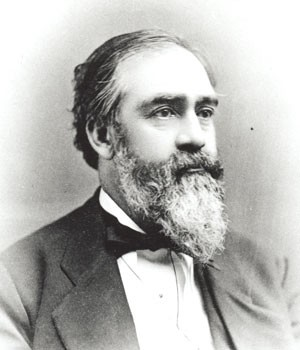
- Henry Rice in 1872
- Born: July 31, 1818; Conway, Massachusetts
- Died: December 27, 1877 (aged 59); Stockton, California, United States
- Known for: Businessman; First mayor of Carson City, Nevada; Second Superintendent of the Carson City Mint
- Political party: Democratic
- Spouse: Jennie E. Hume (c.1820-c.1887)(m. 31 Aug 1853)
- Children: Henry Hume Rice (1854–1899)

Signature
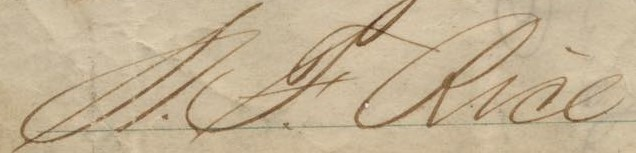

Notes
- Rice Family Papers at University of California, Irvine

Henry Freeman Rice (1818–1877) was an American businessman and silver miner who was a pioneering resident and civic leader in Carson City, Nevada. Early in his career he was associated with the express cargo services in Boston, Massachusetts. He later engaged in coal and transportation businesses in Cleveland, Ohio during the 1840s before moving to Carson City in the early 1850s to engage in silver mining. Although a member of the Democratic Party, he was appointed by President Grant as postmaster of Carson City and Superintendent of the Carson City Mint, and he managed the Wells Fargo and Company office in Carson City.

== Early life and early career ==
Henry Freeman Rice was born 31 July 1818 in Conway, Massachusetts to Stephen Rice (1769–1891) and Abigail Freeman Hamilton Rice (1812–1889). Rice began his career in the express cargo and insurance sales businesses in the 1830s in Boston before moving to Cleveland, Ohio in the 1840s with several of his relatives. He married Jennie E. Hume (c1820–c1887) of Maitland, Nova Scotia, Canada on 31 August 1853, and they had one son Harry Hume Rice (1854-1899) known as “Lightning Harry” for his skills as an aggressive locomotive engineer with the Virginia and Truckee Railroad.

== Life and career in Nevada ==
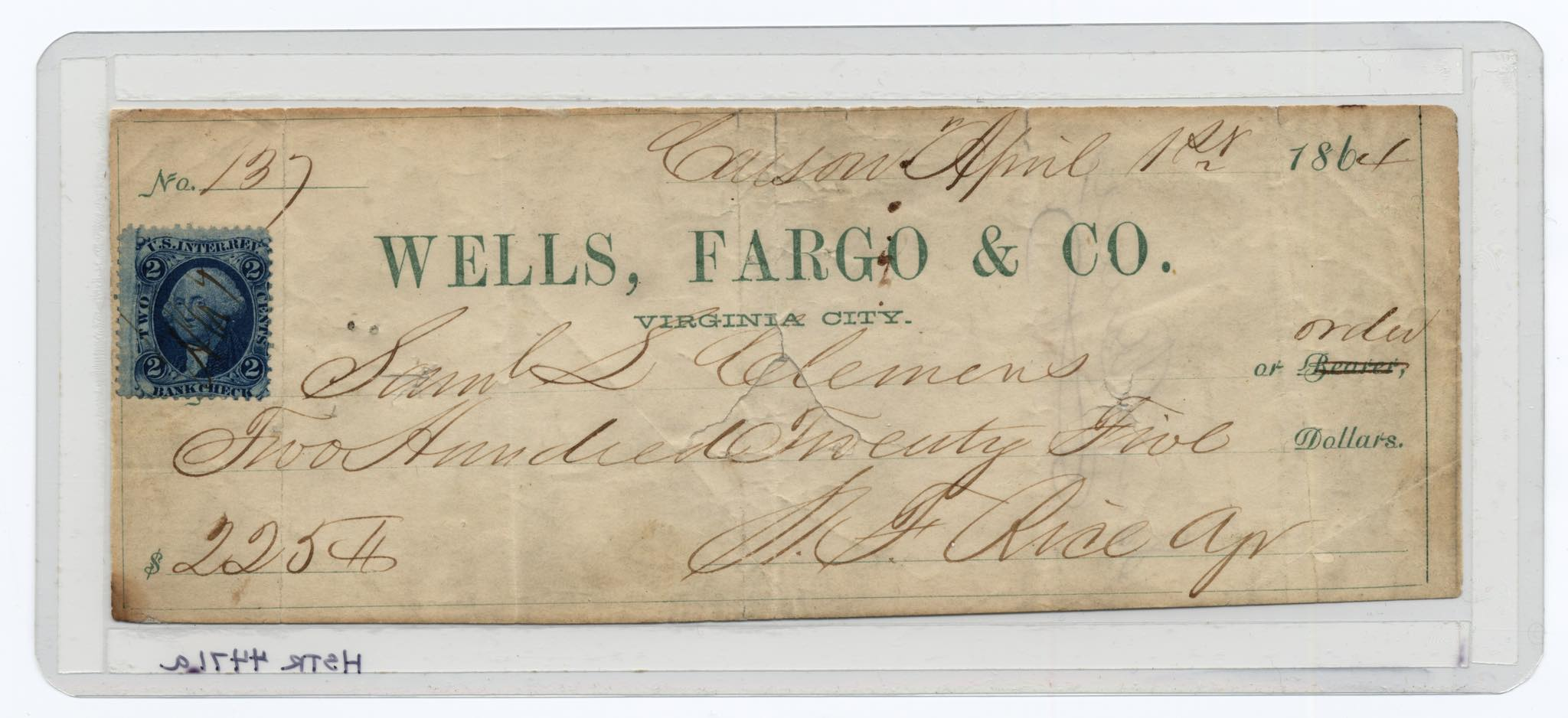
Western Union Money Order made out to Samuel Clemens by Henry Freeman Rice on 1 Apr 1864

Henry Freeman Rice and his family moved to Carson City, Nevada in the early 1850s as silver was being discovered in the Comstock Lode region. While in Carson City, he developed a reputation as an upstanding citizen who was elected as the first mayor of Carson City. Rice also served the superintendent of the Wells Fargo and Company office in Carson City. In December 1865, Rice had been appointed by U.S. Treasury Secretary Hugh McCulloch to be one of the commissioners to oversee the efforts to have a mint established in Nevada’s capital city. Despite being a registered Democrat, President Ulysses S. Grant appointed Rice to be the postmaster of Carson City in 1869, as well as appointing him to be the second superintendent of the Carson City Mint in October 1870. Rice resigned as the superintendent in May 1873 in protest of the firing of two of his most trusted officers at the mint over alleged production of sub-par coinage (other accounts allege he was forced to resign), and he returned to his position with Wells Fargo. That same year with a partner, Ormsby County Treasurer Henry J. Peters, he incorporated a securities exchange in Carson City.

== Later years and death ==
The poor financial climate of the 1870s caused the failure of Rice's partnership securities brokerage house of Rice & Peters in 1877. Resulting from that calamity, Rice had been in a very depressed state of mind and he had gone to Stockton, California to seek medical treatment. He was reported to have died as a result of an overdose of his medications (some accounts allege suicide). Rice was buried in a family plot at Lone Mountain Cemetery in Carson City.

== The Rice family relations and genealogy ==
Rice’s half-brother Harvey Rice (1800-1891) was a lawyer and newspaperman in Cleveland. Henry Freeman Rice was a direct patrilineal descendant of Edmund Rice, an English immigrant to Massachusetts Bay Colony, as follows:

- Henry Freeman Rice, son of

- Stephen Rice (1769 – 1850) son of
- Cyrus Rice (1726 – 1804), son of

- Josiah Rice (1696 – 1730), son of
- Ephraim Rice (1665 – 1732), son of
- Thomas Rice (1625 – 1681), son of

- Edmund Rice (1594 – 1663)
