= James S. Rice =

James Stephen Rice
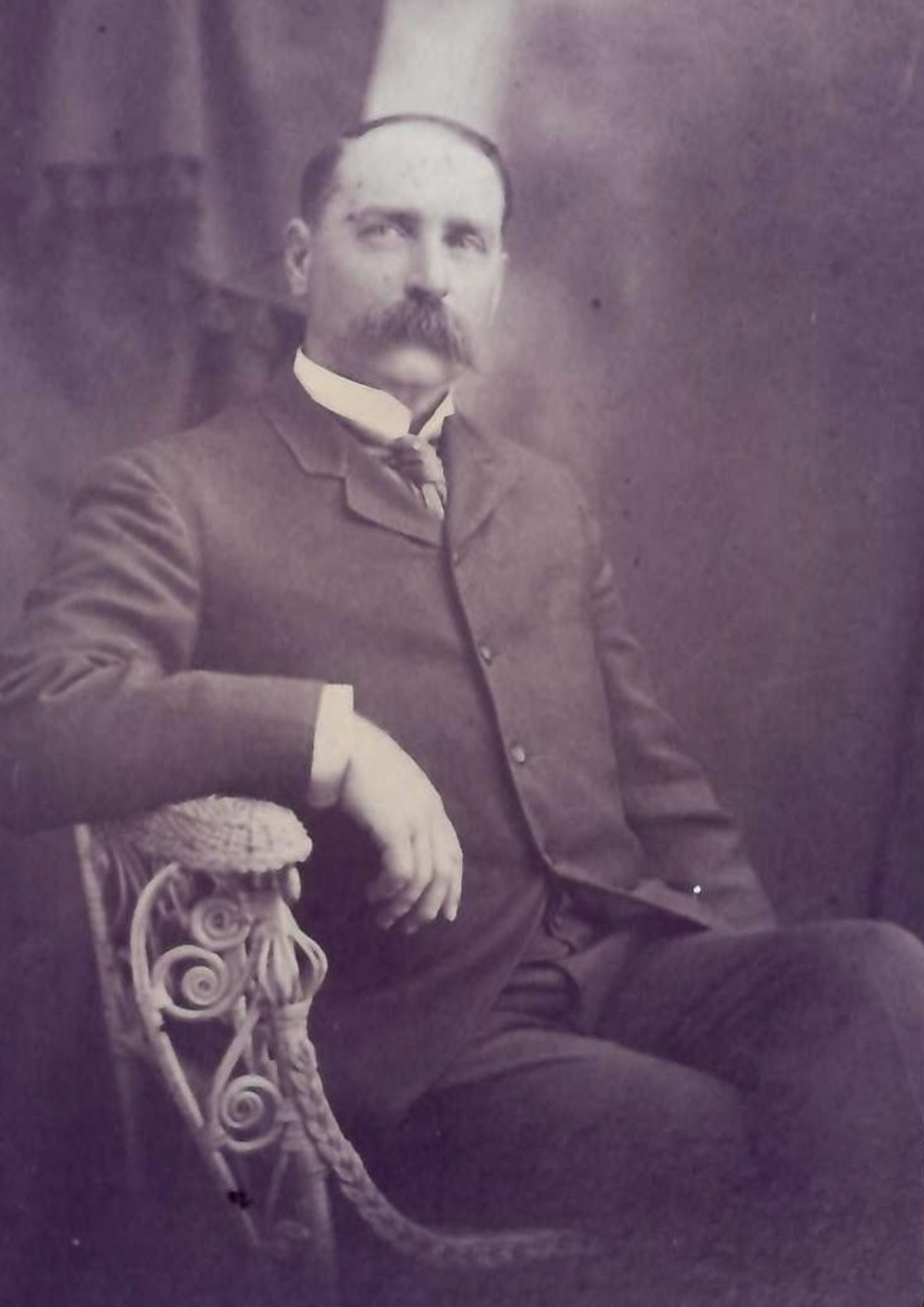
- Rice, circa 1885
- Born: October 31, 1846; Cleveland, Ohio
- Died: April 15, 1930 (aged 83); Tustin, California, United States
- Education: Western Reserve College BA 1866
- Known for: pioneering rancher in Tustin, California
- Political party: Democratic
- Spouse: Coralinn Frances Barlow (1849–1919)(m. 2 Oct 1872)
- Children: James Willis Rice (1873–1951); Merrill Barlow Rice (1876–1919); Harvey Rice, Jr. (1878–1900); Percy Fitch Rice (1882–1954)

Notes
- James Rice family papers at the University of California, Irvine

James Stephen Rice (1846–1930) was an American businessman and rancher who was a pioneering resident of Orange County, California and a civic leader in Tustin, California.

== Early life and education in Ohio ==
James Stephen Rice was born pm 31 October 1846 in Cleveland, Ohio, to Harvey Rice (1800–1891) and Emma Maria (Fitch) Rice (1812–1889). Rice was educated in the public schools in Cleveland and attended Case Western Reserve College in Hudson, Ohio, graduating with a BA degree in classical studies in 1866. Rice married Coralinn Frances Barlow (1849–1919) of Cleveland on 2 October 1872, and they had four children. From 1866 to 1877, he was in business with his half-brother Percival Wood Rice and P.W. Rice's brother-in-law Proctor Rollin Burnett, who were proprietors of the Rice & Burnett Company, a crockery, silverware, and home furnishing business in Cleveland.

== Life and career in California ==
The James S. and Coralinn Rice House on First Street (corner of Prospect), Tustin, California 1895

Rice and his family moved to Orange County, California, on 18 January 1877, first residing near the head of Newport Bay in one of the former ranch houses owned by José Antonio Andres Sepúlveda (1803–1875), the owner of Rancho San Joaquin. Rice began ranching by working for his brother-in-law James Irvine who had purchased the Rancho San Joaquin from Sepúlveda in 1864 and established the Irvine Ranch.

In 1878, Rice purchased a small tract of land from Peter Potts in the village of Tustin, shortly after Columbus Tustin laid out the first real estate plats, and he planted Valencia orange trees and Muscat grapes. A few years later, he purchased an additional tract of 50 acres (200,000 m^{2}) and expanded his lucrative agricultural operations. In the California real estate boom of 1886–87, he sold off all but 12 acres (49,000 m^{2}) of his land for development at $4000 per acre, allowing him to build a three-story home on his remaining property. Mrs. Coralinn Rice was a noted Orange County socialite frequently hosting performing artists including Helena Modjeska at their home in Tustin. Mrs. Coralinn Rice died in 1919.

Rice was active in politics in Orange County, serving as chairman of the Orange County Democratic Party Central Committee in the early 1920s. Rice died on 15 April 1930 at his home in Tustin, and buried at Fairhaven Memorial Park in Santa Ana, California.

== The Rice family relations and genealogy ==
Percy Fitch Rice in 1903 with his automatic paper feeding mechanism for the printing press

James S. Rice's eldest son, James Willis Rice, who was born on 24 August 1873 in Cleveland, followed his father as a rancher and fruit grower in the Tustin, California area. About 1910 James W. Rice married Ruebel Martin, daughter of John Henry Martin, a Nevada state senator from Douglas County, Nevada, and they had two sons: Harvey M. Rice (1913–1974), and James Willis Rice Jr. (1916–1996). James W. Rice Sr. died in 1951 in Tustin.

James S. Rice's youngest son, Percy Fitch Rice, who was born on 25 November 1882, was an accomplished inventor who patented several devices, including an automatic paper feeding device for printing presses (U.S. patent 789,881 1903), an automatic transmission for automobiles (U.S. patent 1,087,552 1913), the push-button radio tuner (U.S. patent 2,316,365 1925), the gasoline gauge for the automobile (U.S. patent 1,767,699 1930) and a multiple exposure camera (U.S. patent 2,497,559 1947). He lived in Orange County for most of his life, dying there on 25 May 1954.

Rice's sister, Henrietta Maria "Nettie" (Rice) Irvine (1841–1874) was married to James Irvine, a San Francisco merchant and founder of the Irvine Ranch in Orange County. His brother-in-law (the brother of Coralinn), Charles Averill Barlow (1858–1927), lived in Bakersfield, California and was a U.S. Congressman from the Populist Party serving in California's 6th congressional district.

James S. Rice was a direct descendant of Edmund Rice, an English immigrant to Massachusetts Bay Colony, as follows:

- James Stephen Rice, son of

- Harvey Rice, (1800 – 1891), son of

- Stephen Rice (1769 – 1850) son of
- Cyrus Rice (1726 – 1804), son of

- Josiah Rice (1696 – 1730), son of
- Ephraim Rice (1665 – 1732), son of
- Thomas Rice (1625 – 1681), son of

- Edmund Rice (1594 – 1663)
