= PS Tashmoo =

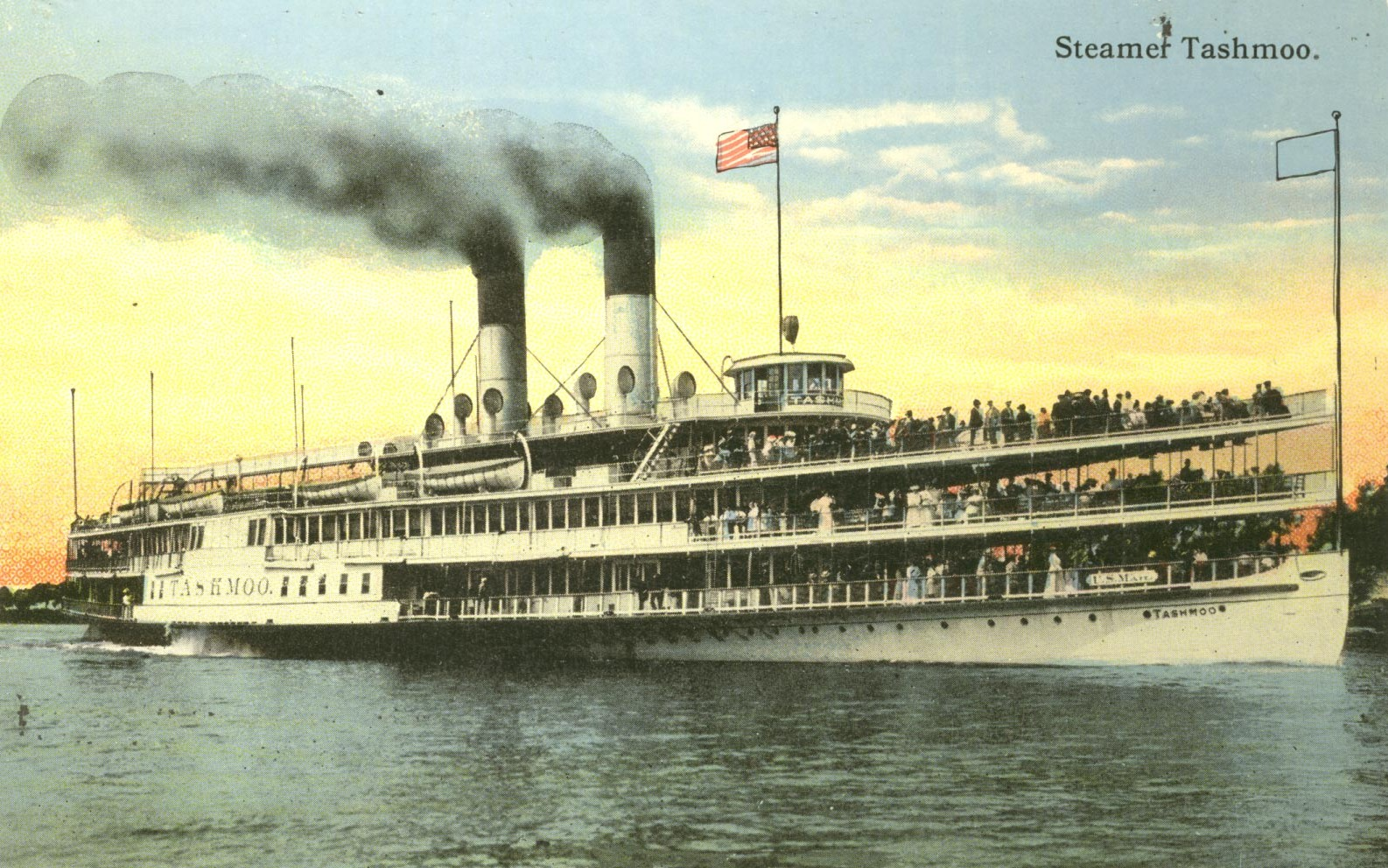
- Postcard from 1907 depicting the Tashmoo

History

United States
- Name: S.S. Tashmoo
- Namesake: Tashmoo Park
- Owner: White Star Steamship Co.
- Builder: Detroit Shipbuilding Company, Wyandotte, Michigan
- Launched: December 30, 1899
- Identification: US 145843
- Fate: Sank in 1936 and scrapped

General characteristics
- Type: Sidewheel steamer
- Tonnage: 1,344 GRT
- Length: 320 ft (100 m)
- Beam: 70 ft (20 m)
- Height: 22.3 ft (6.8 m)
- Installed power: 2,500 ihp (1,900 kW) triple expansion steam engine
- Speed: ≥ 20 knots (37 km/h; 23 mph)

The Tashmoo was a sidewheeler steamboat on Lake St. Clair and Lake Huron. It was famous for being one of the fastest ships, at the time, on the Great Lakes.

== Construction ==
The Tashmoo was launched on December 31, 1899. It was built by the Detroit Shipbuilding Company in Wyandotte, Michigan for Detroit's White Star Steamship Company. The Tashmoo was nicknamed the "White Flyer" and, because of the number of windows on the ship, the "Glass Hack."

== Operations ==
The Tashmoo's regular route was from Detroit to Port Huron, Michigan. It made several stops along the way, including at its namesake, Tashmoo Park.

== Steamboat race ==
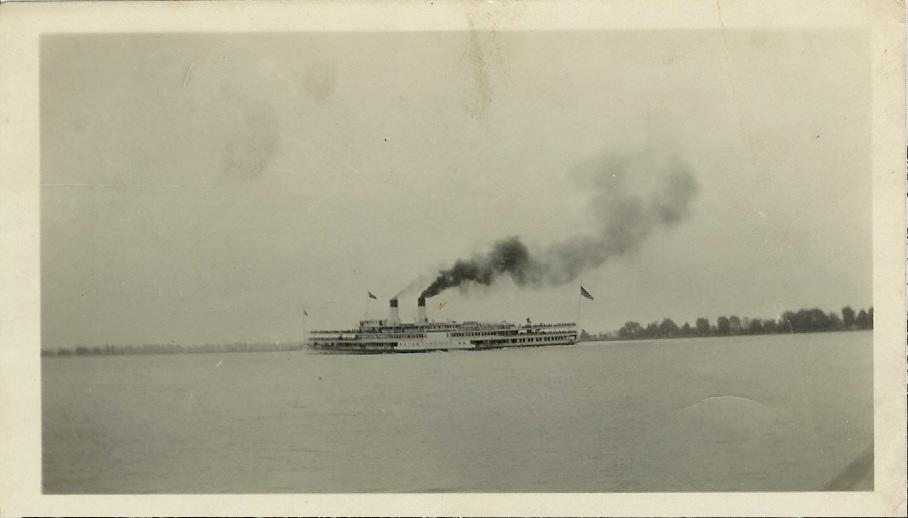
Tashmoo on Lake St Claire, 1922

After a race between the City of Chicago and the City of Milwaukee in September 1900, a Chicago–newspaper boasted that the winner (the City of Chicago) was the "fastest on the lakes". A paper in Detroit, Michigan subsequently listed nine vessels that could have easily beaten the City of Chicago. The list did not mention the Tashmoo. A. A. Parker, the president of the White Star Line, offered $1,000 to any ship that could beat the Tashmoo in a race. The president of the Cleveland Buffalo Transit Company accepted the challenge on behalf of his ship, the City of Erie. The course was 82 nautical miles (152 km; 94 mi) long and went from Cleveland, Ohio to Erie, Pennsylvania.

The Tashmoo fell behind at the start of the race but quickly regained ground. It was forced to slow after going out of sight of the shore because the "wheelman was not used to steering [only] by compass." The Tashmoo was later forced to slow again due to an overheating condenser. The City of Erie eventually beat the Tashmoo by 45 seconds, but the Tashmoo had been catching up to the City of Erie before the finish. A. A. Parker offered the owners of the City of Erie $10,000 for a rematch, but they refused the offer, although they later admitted that the Tashmoo was the faster ship.

== End of service ==
On December 8, 1927, the Tashmoo snapped its moorings during a gale and starting drifting up the Detroit River. It collided with a ferry and was found further upstream, stopped by the Belle Isle Bridge. Two tugboats pulled the Tashmoo away from bridge, but the cables broke again and the ship once again headed for the bridge. The ship was 10 yards (9.1 m) away from the bridge before the tugboats were able to get the Tashmoo secured again. The ship was eventually repaired.

On June 18, 1936, the Tashmoo struck a submerged rock as it was leaving Sugar Island. The ship was able to dock in Amherstburg, Ontario, and be evacuated before it sank in 18 feet (5.5 m) of water. It was eventually scrapped. It was entered into the National Maritime Hall of Fame in 1985.
