= PS City of Erie =

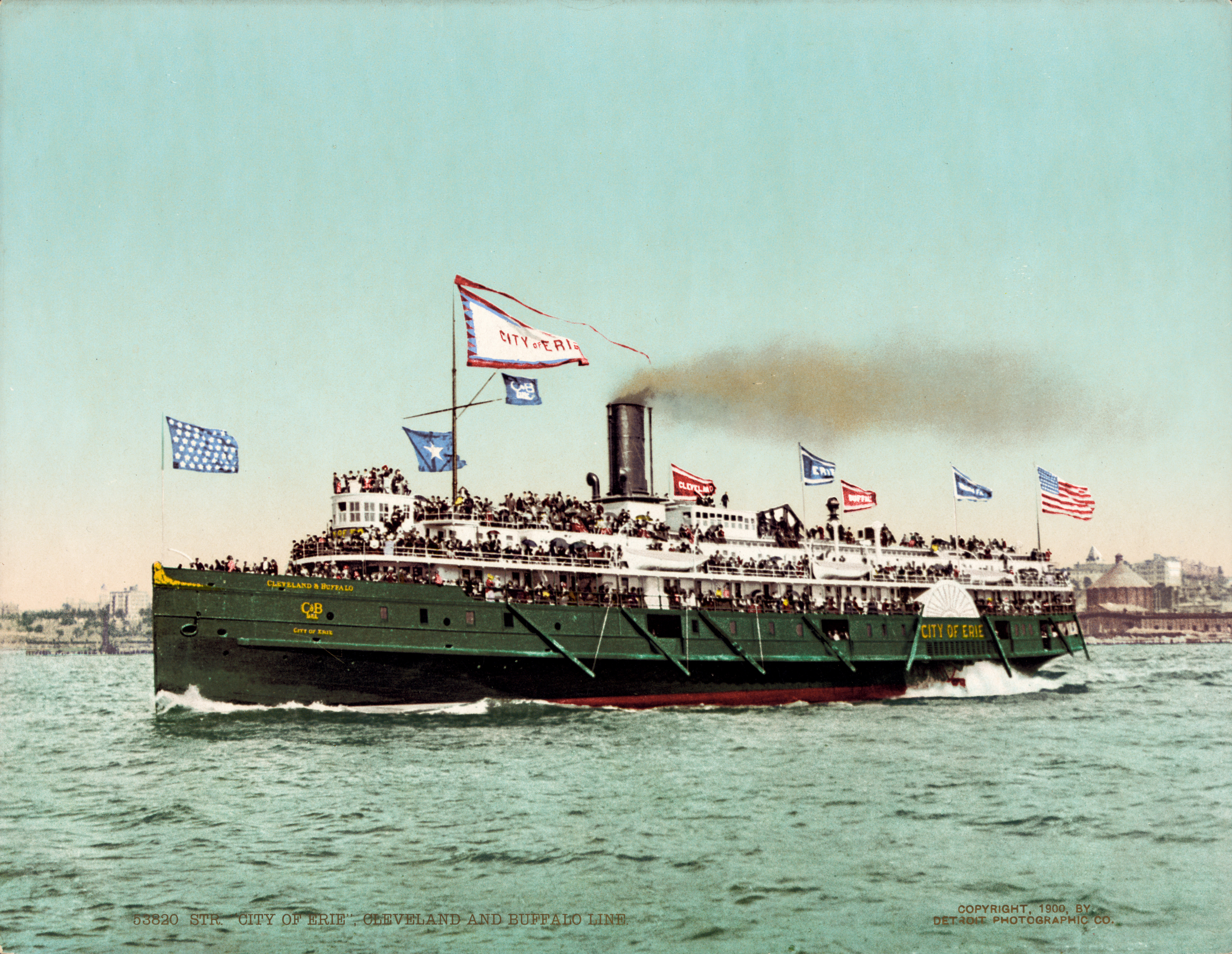
- Photochrom print of the City of EriePhotochrom from 1902 depicting the City of Erie

History

United States
- Name: City of Erie
- Namesake: Erie, Pennsylvania
- Owner: Cleveland Buffalo Transit Company
- Builder: Detroit Dry Dock Company
- Launched: February 26, 1898
- Maiden voyage: June 19, 1898
- Identification: US 127242
- Fate: Scrapped in 1941

General characteristics
- Type: Sidewheel steamer
- Tonnage: 2,498 GRT
- Length: 316 ft (96 m)
- Beam: 78 ft (24 m)
- Height: 18 ft (5.5 m)
- Installed power: 2,200 ihp (1,600 kW) walking beam engine
- Speed: 17.5 knots (32.4 km/h; 20.1 mph)
- Capacity: 450 passengers

SS City of Erie was a sidewheeler steamboat on Lake Erie. It was famous for being one of the fastest ships on the Great Lakes, at the time. It also won a race against a newer, rival ship.

== Construction ==
The City of Erie was built in 1898 by the Detroit Dry Dock Company in Wyandotte, Michigan, for the Cleveland Buffalo Transit Company (C&B). It was designed by Frank E. Kirby. The ship was launched on February 26, 1898, and made its maiden voyage on June 19, 1898.

== Operations ==
The City of Erie's route was from Cleveland, Ohio, and Erie, Pennsylvania, to Buffalo, New York. It was nicknamed the "Honeymoon Special" from the number of newlyweds who travelled to Buffalo, bound for Niagara Falls, on the City of Erie. Starting in 1929, the City of Erie operated between Cleveland and Port Stanley, Ontario.

== Steamboat race ==
After a friendly race between the City of Chicago and the City of Milwaukee in September 1900, a Chicago newspaper boasted the winner (the City of Chicago) was the "fastest on the lakes". A paper in Detroit, Michigan, subsequently listed nine other vessels (including the City of Erie) that could have easily beat the City of Chicago. The list failed to mention the newest ship built for Detroit's White Star Line, the Tashmoo. The Tashmoo, also designed by Kirby, was built in 1900 and was built specifically for speed. The president of Detroit's White Star Line offered $1,000 to any ship that could beat the Tashmoo in a race. J. W. Wescott, president of the C&B, accepted the challenge. The set course was 82 nautical miles (152 km; 94 mi) long, going along the City of Erie's regular route from Cleveland to Erie.

The City of Erie was initially ahead but was soon overtaken by the Tashmoo. The Tashmoo eventually slowed and was passed as soon as it was out of sight of the shore because the "wheelman [of the Tashmoo] was not used to steering [only] by compass." The Tashmoo was later forced to slow again due to an overheating condenser. The City of Erie beat the Tashmoo by 45 seconds, with the Tashmoo still gaining ground. The owners of the City of Erie refused to have a rematch, although it was admitted that the Tashmoo was the faster ship.

== End of service ==
On September 27, 1909, the City of Erie collided with the schooner, T. Vance Straubenstein. The schooner was sunk, drowning three people.

The City of Erie was retired from service in 1938 and was scrapped in Cleveland in 1941.
