= Harvey Rice =

American politician (1800–1891)

- Harvey Rice (1800 - 1891)
- Born: June 11, 1800; Conway, Massachusetts, U.S.
- Died: November 7, 1891 (aged 91); Cleveland, Ohio, U.S.
- Burial place: Lake View Cemetery, Cleveland, Ohio, U.S.
- Education: Williams College
- Known for: co-founder of The Plain Dealer, state legislator
- Spouses: Fannie Rice (m. 1828; died 1837) Emma Maria Fitch (m. 1840)
- Children: Percival Wood Rice (1829–1909); Fannie Maria Rice (1832–1888); Henrietta M. Rice (1834–1837); Harvey Hayden Rice (1836–1837); Henrietta Maria Rice (1841-1874); Emma Fitch Rice (1842–1867); Mary Wood Rice (1844–1911); James Stephen Rice (1846–1939); Harvey Rice, Jr. (1848–1903)

Notes
- Rice Family Papers at University of California, Irvine

Harvey Rice, LL.D. (1800–1891) was an American lawyer, a Democratic state legislator, poet, author and newspaperman prominent in Cleveland, Ohio.

== Early life and education ==
Harvey Rice was born in Conway, Massachusetts, June 11, 1800 to Stephen Rice and Lucy (Baker) Rice. He received his A.B. degree from Williams College in Williamstown, Massachusetts in 1824. After graduation, he moved west to Cleveland to study law under the tutelage of Reuben Wood. In 1826, was admitted to the bar that year and entered law practice as a partner with Reuben Wood. His doctor of laws degree was awarded by Williams College.

== Professional career ==
In 1828, Rice and other partners started a newspaper The Independent News Letter, that was later reorganized and renamed The Plain Dealer in 1842. In 1829, Rice became the managing editor of the paper. That same year he was appointed as Justice of the Peace. In 1830, he was elected as a Representative in the Ohio House of Representatives as a Democrat, serving for two years. He was appointed in 1830 as agent for the sale of fifty thousand acres Western Reserve School Lands. Over a three-year period he raised the sum of $150,000 through the sale of the public lands which was used to establish the public school system in Ohio.

In 1851 Rice was elected to the Ohio Senate and served for two years. During his time in the senate, he was responsible for introduction and passage of laws to reorganize the public school system of the state and establish a system of public libraries. He was a member of Cleveland City Council in 1857. From 1879 until his death, he was president of the Early Settlers Association of the Western Reserve.

== Selected publications ==
- Rice, H. (1858). Mt. Vernon and other Poems. Boston, John P. Jewett & Co.; Cleveland, Henry P. B. Jewett, 179pp + notes.
- Rice H. (1875). Nature and Culture. Lee and Shepard Publishers, Boston. 202pp.
- Rice, H. (1883). Pioneers of the Western Reserve. Lee and Shepard Publishers, Boston. 350pp.

== Family life ==
Harvey Rice married Fannie Rice, daughter of Truman Rice on 27 September 1828 and they had four children: Percival Wood Rice, Fannie Maria Rice, Henrietta M. Rice and Harvey Hayden Rice. Fannie Rice died 21 December 1837. Three years after her death, Harvey Rice married Emma Fitch, and they had five children: Henrietta Maria Rice, Emma Fitch Rice, Mary Wood Rice, James Stephen Rice, and Harvey Rice, Jr. Harvey Rice's half-brother Henry Freeman Rice was a businessman in Carson City, Nevada and superintendent of the Carson City Mint. Harvey Rice died on 7 November 1891 in Cleveland and was buried at Cleveland's Lake View Cemetery.

== Legacy ==
For his support of education in Cleveland, an elementary school was named in his honor. In 1899, the City of Cleveland erected a statue by James G. C. Hamilton in his honor at the Fine Arts Museum Garden Area on East Boulevard in Cleveland.

== Genealogy ==
Harvey Rice was a direct descendant of Edmund Rice, an English immigrant to Massachusetts Bay Colony, as follows:

- Harvey Rice, son of

- Stephen Rice (1769 – 1850) son of
- Cyrus Rice (1726 – 1804), son of

- Josiah Rice (1696 – 1730), son of
- Ephraim Rice (1665 – 1732), son of
- Thomas Rice (1625 – 1681), son of

- Edmund Rice (1594 – 1663)
