= Fenway-Boylston Street District =

Historic district in Massachusetts, United States

- U.S. National Register of Historic Places
- U.S. Historic district
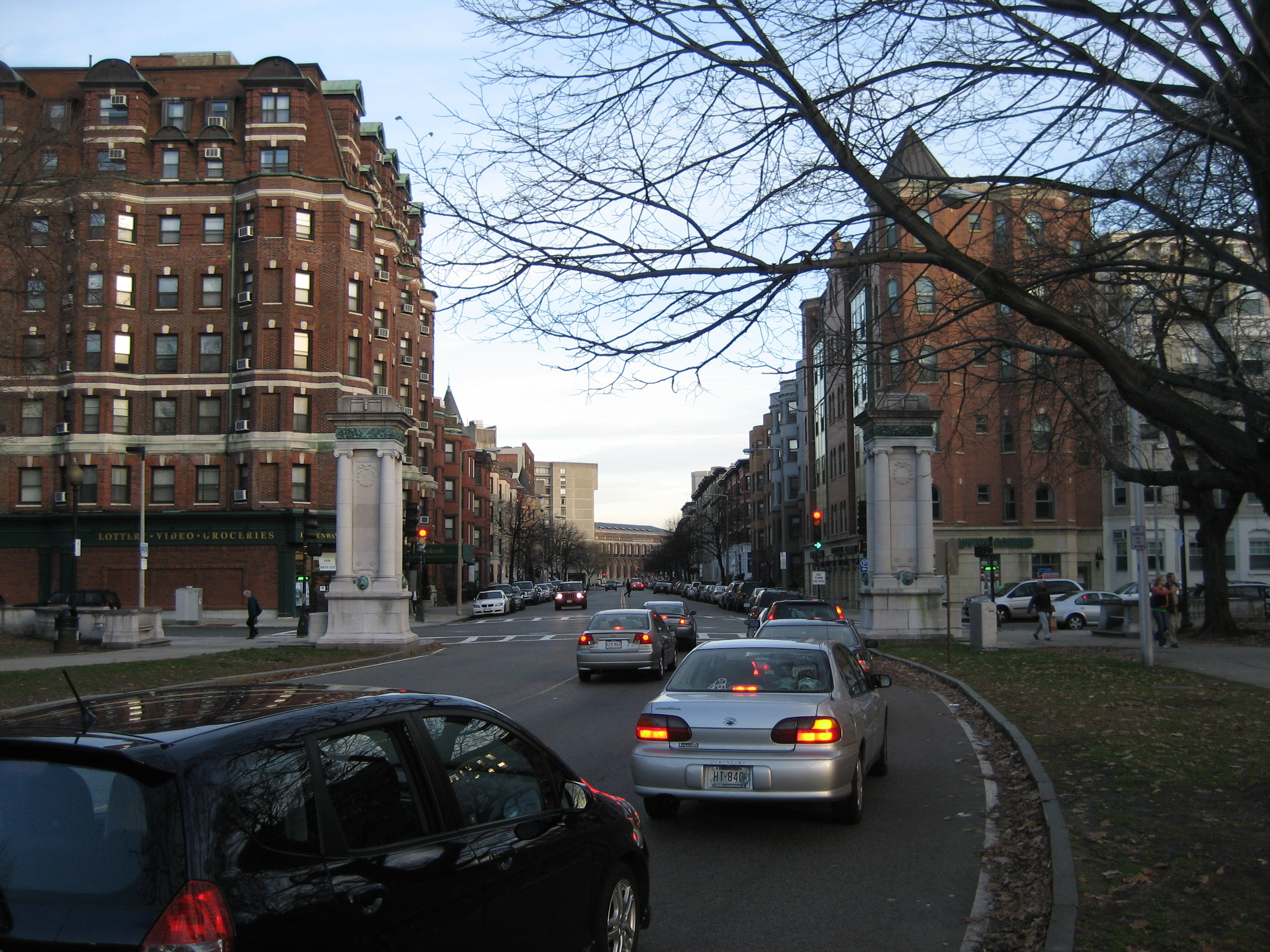
- Beginning of Westland Avenue at the intersection of Hemenway Street and Fenway.

- Location within Massachusetts Location within the United States
- Location: Boston, Massachusetts
- Coordinates: 42°20′43″N 71°5′26″W
- Area: 3.25 acres (1.32 ha)
- Built: 1891
- Architect: Multiple
- Architectural style: Colonial Revival, Classical Revival, Queen Anne
- NRHP reference No.: 84002875
- Added to NRHP: September 4, 1984

The Fenway-Boylston Street District is a historic district encompassing a series of predominantly residential buildings lining The Fenway in the Fenway–Kenmore of Boston, Massachusetts. Developed beginning in the 1890s, the area is emblematic of Boston's upper-class residential development of the period, with architect-designed houses built for some of the city's leading families. The district was listed on the National Register of Historic Places in 1984.

== Description and history ==
The Fenway-Boylston Street District is located on the east side of Boston's Back Bay Fens, a public park designed by Frederick Law Olmsted. The Fens are flanked here by The Fenway, a parkway built in the 1880s when the park was laid out. The east side of the parkway is lined with buildings historically built as residences, set between the parkway and Hemenway Street, which was built in 1878 on top of an embankment that had isolated the Muddy River flats earlier in the 19th century. The houses were built between 1890 and about 1910, and are built of brick and stone. Stylistically they range from the elaborate Queen Anne and Beaux Arts styles to the more restrained Classical Revival. Although the area had been intended as a residential area, it attracted institutions as well, and many of the buildings are today occupied by students at area educational institutions. Anchoring the southern end of the district is the building of the Massachusetts Historical Society, a National Historic Landmark, at the junction of The Fenway and Boylston Street.

Just east of the Massachusetts Historic Society is the former Chambers Hotel, a Beaux Arts building designed by Arthur H. Bowditch and completed in 1901. Another institutional building is that built for the Boston Medical Library at 18 The Fenway. It is next door to the townhouse of Robert Swain Peabody, one of the principals of Boston's leading architectural firm, Peabody & Stearns. It and two adjacent townhouses are Peabody designs, while there are also works of Alexander Wadsworth Longfellow Jr. and other leading Boston architects on the block. The historic district also includes the Johnson Memorial Gate, located where Westland Avenue enters the park. The gate was designed by Guy Lowell, whose nearby works (outside the district) including Boston Museum of Fine Arts.

== See also ==
- National Register of Historic Places listings in southern Boston, Massachusetts
