= Social housekeeping =

Socio-political movement

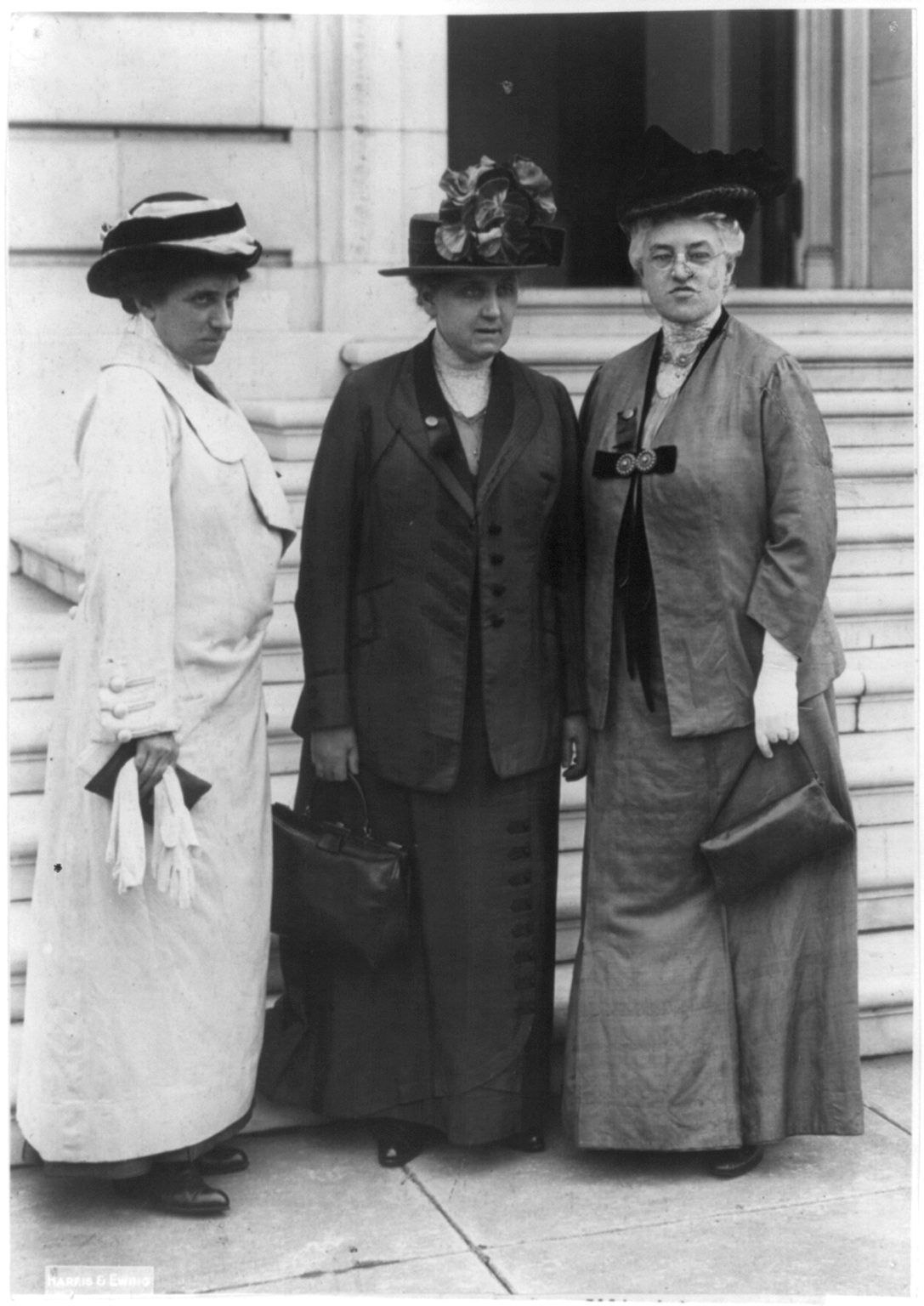
Julia Lathrop, Jane Addams, and Mary McDowell in Washington

Social housekeeping, also known as municipal or civil housekeeping, was a socio-political movement that occurred primarily through the 1880s to the early 1900s in the Progressive Era around the United States.

The movement expanded the customary view of a woman's domain as the home, to portray the community as extension of this sphere of influence. The language of social housekeeping served to justify increased female participation in socio-political matters.

Those involved in the movement sought both legislative and social reform for issues including education, regulation of foodstuffs and medicines, sanitation and health. The reform occurred outside of the exclusionary political structures and instead in women's clubs, colleges and settlement houses.

== Origins ==
Differing attitudes towards the work of woman, particularly those held by ideologies including material and cultural feminism, culminated in the creation of social housekeeping. According to material feminists, the unbalanced division of domestic work could be aided by a financial acknowledgement of these tasks. Cultural feminists believed that skills that developed from traditional women's work made them better suited to the tasks of local government.

An interweaving of both paradigms resulted in the reframing of the definition of the home to include the wider community. The customary conventions of femininity, which depicted the essential role of a woman as the maternal figure of wife and/or mother, facilitated the work of reformer women, as they could justify their value and expertise in tidying their cities on political and social levels, since their prior domestic work had developed an innate awareness of the needs and wants of others.

Social housekeepers described the city as an enlarged home that had to be managed as such, which served as a safeguard against the masculine model of the city as a business. This feminised civic activity provided a mutual ground for activism and reform to develop, supported by connections with the political mechanisms of local government. By redefining the home in a manner that was all-encompassing, the exclusionary practices in the public sphere could no longer hinder the socio-political participation of women.

== Development ==
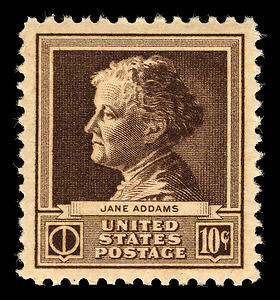
Jane Addams on U.S. Postage Stamp

Early appearances of the language of social housekeeping can be found in the writing of female activists, club women and assorted women's publications. The social housekeeping movement utilised the image of housekeeping to bond traditional domestic gender roles with their pursuit to aid social matters.

As the movement developed, groups of women sought reform in similar areas which led to involvement in the work of the women's club movement. Similar to the intents of social housekeeping, women's clubs provided an opportunity to overcome the societally imposed gap between the private and public sphere. The women's club movement benefited from the language of social housekeeping, as it facilitated their later promotion of maternalistic ideology.

In the 1890s, Mary Eno Bassett Mumford worked to form an alliance between the women's Civic Club and the men's Municipal League to greater facilitate club women's ability to serve as municipal housekeepers. Whilst men tended to work directly in parties and government, the exclusionary disenfranchisement of women prompted the creation and operation of voluntary organisations.

The social housekeeping movement did not necessarily equate with giving all women the vote. There were prominent reformer women in both suffragist and anti-suffragist movements. Whilst some social housekeepers like Caroline Bartlett Crane believed the vote would enhance the effectiveness of social housekeepers. Social housekeepers who were for suffrage, acknowledged that despite the benefits of the vote, it was not necessary to facilitate their impact on society.

The later views of social housekeeping are expressed in the works of female reformers like Jane Addams. In “Women and Public Housekeeping”, a broadside written by Jane Addams and published by the National American Woman Suffrage Association in 1913, Addams proposed that many of the activities of local councils were previously tasked to women yet as soon as they became governmental responsibilities, women were excluded. Addams explained that the skills required to multitask and meet the complex demands of others was matched best by women who developed these competencies by managing households.

== Impact ==
=== Waste and sanitation ===
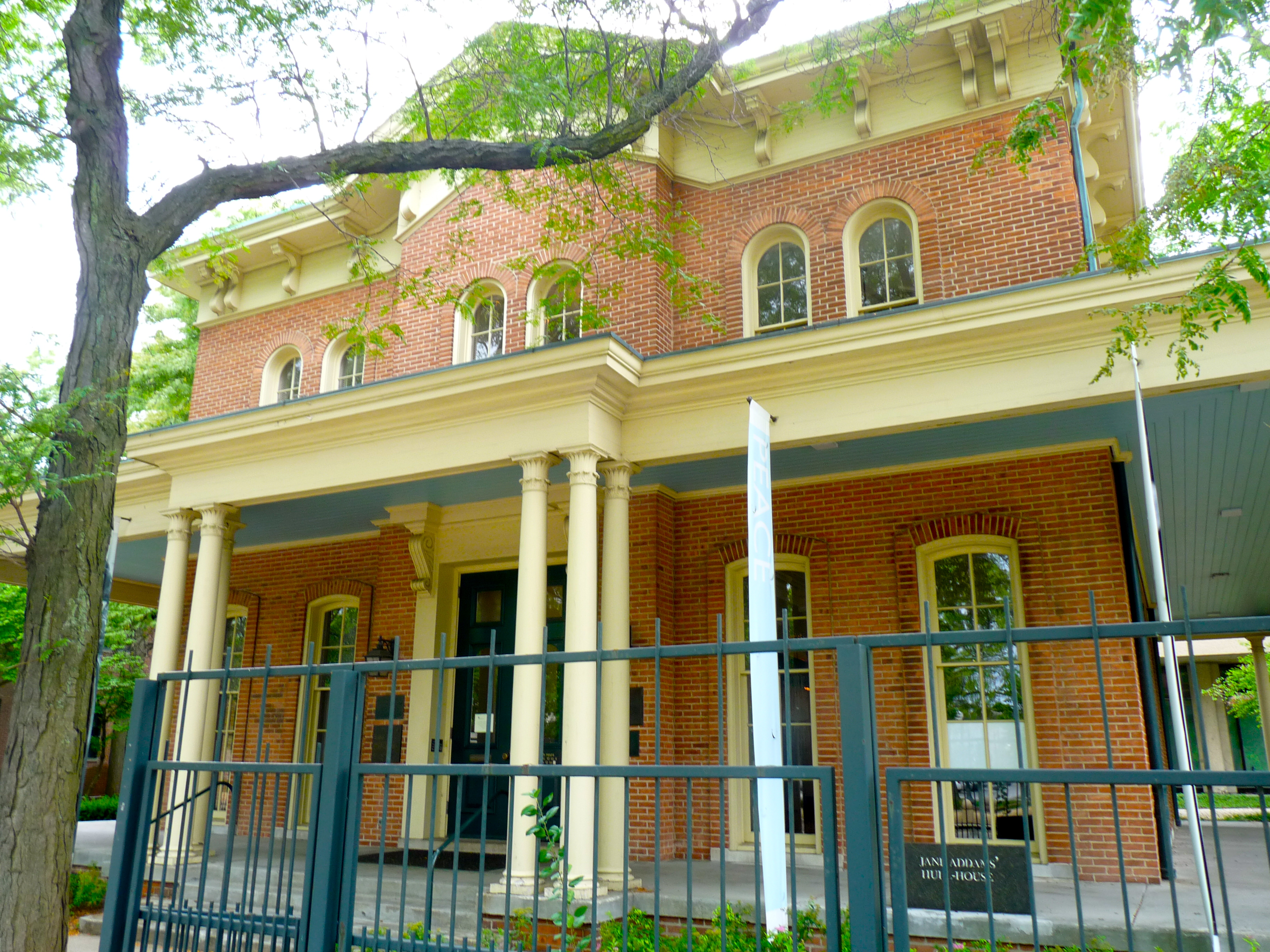
Hull House

Social housekeepers sought legislative reform for street cleaning and tenement inspection with the aim of establishing systematic waste and sanitation management. Female politicians often focussed on policy that would deal with cleaning up the city under the guise of housekeeping, like the installation of a piped water transport system by the mayor of Jackson, Wyoming. The sanitation reform enacted by municipal housekeepers bonded domesticity and politics, which positioned the skills of the woman as an effective municipal asset.

Reformer Caroline Bartlett Crane served as a consultant in matters of sanitation and municipal cleanliness to other communities. As part of this role she would complete surveys and interviews, examine municipal records and print media texts, before sharing her suggestions at a town meeting and in a report.

The New Century Club in Philadelphia formed a Water Supply Committee which campaigned for clean water and reporting on unhygienic schoolhouses. The group hired an expert whose investigation of the dirty water in their area helped to persuade municipal government to invest $3,000,000 into the recommended new method of sand filtration.

In Chicago, Jane Addams and her fellow members of Hull House endeavoured to clean up the mishandled waste in their area but their efforts were obstructed by the local council. The council handled the issue by giving Addams the position of garbage inspector of the ward on a salary of one thousand dollars per year. The Hull House residents worked to improve the operation of the ward's existing nine garbage wagons and added another eight.

The Ladies Health Protective Association, formed by residents of Beckman Hill in New York City in 1884, recommended the benefits of appointing women as inspectors to the mayor. The Chicago Municipal Order League, modelled after the Ladies Health Protective Association, sought clean streets and alleys under the direction of Ada Celeste Sweet. They informed neighbourhoods and their elected representatives, which resulted in the ordinance passed in the Chicago city council in 1892 to create a new Department of Street Cleaning with its own superintendent.

Fellow Hull House resident and sanitation reformer, Mary Eliza McDowell travelled to Germany and completed research of waste and sanitation facilities. Her work led to her appointment as Chicago's first Commissioner of Public Welfare in 1923, where she sought to alter public opinion about the dangers of ineffective waste management systems. As a key part of Chicago's City Waste Committee, McDowell advised the institution of civil ownership and operation of waste management facilities with a central reduction plant and subsidiary incineration plants.

=== Health and food safety ===
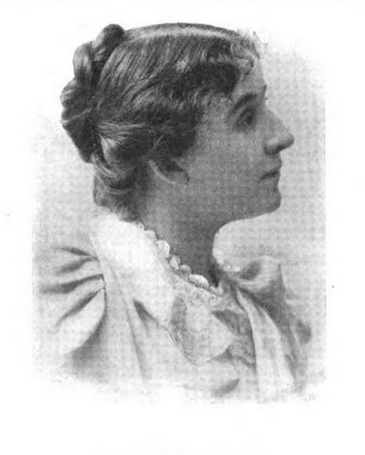
Caroline Bartlett Crane

Social housekeepers sought better management of, treatment and the prevention of illness. By 1910, 546 women's clubs in the US had helped to set up hospitals, tuberculosis clinics and sanatoria, 452 had set up open air meetings to discuss improvements to health conditions and 246 had placed wall cards in public areas with information about public health ordinances.

Groups like the Women's Christian Temperance Union sought to regulate the health issues that arose from the developments in food preservation that relied on chemicals. Women's groups strove to objectively research and document food contamination, lobbying for legislation to protect the cleanliness of food, drink and drugs. Caroline Bartlett Crane and other leaders spoke throughout the nation to highlight potential issues such as meat contamination, lead poisoning from cans and foods treated with antiseptics and chemical preservatives. The Massachusetts chapter of the American Association of University Women completed a state-wide survey of the contamination in a typical family's food. Similar studies were completed in other states by their local chapters. This work led to the legislating of the Pure Food and Drug Act in 1906 under the leadership of President Theodore Roosevelt.

Social housekeeping also sought to bring greater awareness to other factors in the domestic sphere causing illness. Improper washing habits meant people were more susceptible to infection. In her 1907 text “Household Bacteriology”, Maria Elliott utilised experiments, data and diagrams to explore the risks that dust posed. These developments intersected with the theory of euthenics which focussed on improving the standard of care in living environments by means of purposeful decision making.

=== Education ===
Social housekeepers sought to develop both the formal and informal educational opportunities within their communities. Women's clubs provided a socially acceptable mechanism for the continuing education of women. Reformers such as Caroline Bartlett Crane described the club as the natural opportunity to educate a woman in topics like sociology in order to better seek social reform. Crane helped transform her local church to provide kindergarten classes and to offer educational opportunities for women in science and literature. The education pursuits of women were criticised in many media accounts which suggested that their upskilling would threaten the stability of the household.

Increases in female participation in local government and governmental activity led to greater political capital being invested in the development of children's welfare and formal education. During the early 20th century, communities with greater amounts of female representation in political activity often had higher rates of educational spending. The gradual increase in quality of school facilities also produced a similar phenomenon after 1940 as a result of lessening race-based wage gaps.

The institution of a new Pennsylvanian constitution in 1874 permitted women to sit on school boards. It was not until almost a decade after the initial election of two women in the first year for more women to be elected. The Civic Club advocated for the election of Eliza Butler Kirkbride and Sophia Wells Royce Williams to the school board of Philadelphia's 7th Ward. The unsuccessful campaign's collection of data was spread in a pamphlet titled "The Story of a Woman’s Municipal Campaign", edited by Williams and published by the American Academy of Political and Social Science, which facilitated the spread of the work of municipal housekeepers to other reformers around the nation.

=== Media ===
Rheta Childe Dorr with the first edition of "The Suffragist"

The social housekeeping movement was visibly demonstrated in the newspapers and magazines of the time. Municipal housekeeping journalism sought to reveal social issues coupled with suggestions for reform. The writings populated much of the work in magazines associated with the women's club movement such as The New Cycle.

The work of writers like Rheta Childe Dorr in magazines such as the Hampton's, matched the tones of other expose styles, such as muckracking. Much of Dorr's writing dealt with the significance of social housekeeping, and sought to raise awareness of societal issues that directly affected women. In promoting the work of reformer women, Dorr supported her suggested reform with their achievements as evidence. Dorr's work “The Wreck of the Home” expressed the additional burden placed on working women as they were tasked not only with the maternal role of homemaker but also with the task of earning their wage. Dorr sought to examine the socio-political issues that were central to the predicaments dealt with by women and children. Personal anecdotes, fact and argument were utilised by Dorr to raise awareness of the issues and to suggest effective solutions. Her writing served as a method, for Dorr, to urge female readers to participate more in the reform occurring in their communities and reprimand them for their inaction.

The articles written by female journalists of the time, particularly those dealing with social reform or the women's club movement, can be considered as a manifestation of social housekeeping. In the articles, issues such as juvenile delinquency, sanitation and hygiene, and the difficulties faced by working women were explored through challenging discussions of important social problems supported by empirical data.
