= Talcott Williams =

American journalist, author, and educator (1849–1928)

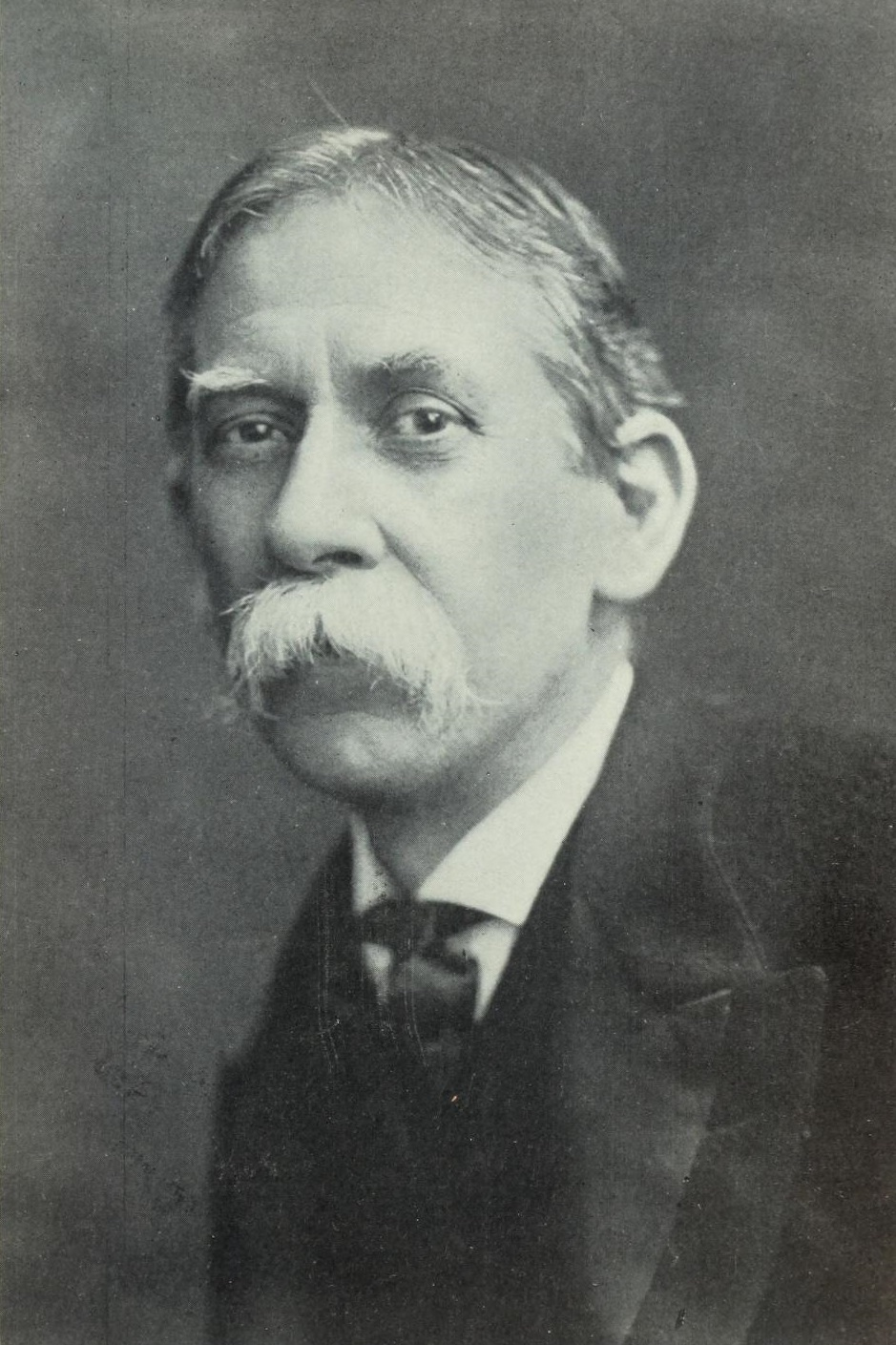
- Born: July 20, 1849; Abeih, Ottoman Turkey
- Died: January 24, 1928 (aged 78); New York, U.S.
- Occupations: Author, journalist, educator
- Spouse: Sophia Wells Royce Williams
- Parent(s): William Frederick and Sarah Amelia (Pond) Williams

Talcott Williams (July 20, 1849 – January 24, 1928) was an American journalist, author and educator. Williams worked as a journalist and editor for nearly four decades, including thirty years with The Philadelphia Press. Williams authored numerous books and articles, and in 1902, Williams was included in the book, "Philadelphia and Notable Philadelphians."

In 1912, Williams became the first director of the newly founded Columbia School of Journalism at Columbia University, built and endowed by Joseph Pulitzer. In 1917, he led the first journalism jury in awarding the first Pulitzer Prizes during World War I, when the School of Journalism had suspended classes and was established as a Washington news service.

Williams was a member of the American Philosophical Society and served with the National Security League, advocating for the promotion of "useful knowledge," by serving on the Committee for Organized Education. He served as president of the American Conference of Teachers of Journalism, and was the recipient of numerous honorary doctorates from institutions including the University of Pennsylvania and Brown College.

== Education and background ==
Williams was born at Abeih, Ottoman Turkey, the son of William Frederick, and Sarah Amelia (Pond) Williams, Congregational Missionaries with the American Board of Commissioners for Foreign Missions. He came to New York at the age of 15, and enrolled in 1866 at Phillips Academy in Andover, Massachusetts, graduating in 1869. He studied at Amherst College and was a member of Alpha Delta Phi; he graduated in 1873.

Williams began his career in journalism, as a reporter for the New York World and as a correspondent for the New York Sun, joining in 1876. He also worked for the San Francisco Chronicle. He was an editorial writer for the Springfield (Mass.) Republican in 1879–81.

Williams married in 1879, his distant cousin, Sophia Wells Royce. They moved to Philadelphia in October, 1881, and he began working as a staff member with The Philadelphia Press. During his time with the newspaper, he wrote art, literature, and theatre reviews, and a weekly business column. Williams spent three decades with the news organization, finishing his career as the associate editor in 1912.

== Academic career ==
In 1912, Williams left The Philadelphia Press to become the first director (Dean) of the newly founded Columbia School of Journalism, built and endowed by Joseph Pulitzer. Williams philosophy of education, led him to design courses that included imparting cultural knowledge as well as promoting an understanding of science. Williams understood, and wrote about the influence that the press had in regards to public opinion. He promoted the idea that a good journalist required a strong academic background. In an article, "Journalism Week at University of Missouri," published by the University Missourian, on Friday, May 17, 1912, Williams was quoted as saying, during a speech he gave titled The profession of Journalism, '"the purpose of the journalist...is to interpret society. The newspaper should always lead."' Responding to criticism that newspapers reveal too many unsavory details regarding social and political conditions, Williams replied:

"You can not keep the smell of sewer gas out of your house by shutting the doors. You must clean the sewer."

In 1913, he served as president of the American Conference of Teachers of Journalism, and he was also on the senate of the Phi Beta Kappa society. After his death, two members of the senate, John Huston Finley and Reverend Oscar M. Voorhees, served as honorary pallbearers.

Williams led the first journalism jury, in awarding the first Pulitzer Prizes in 1917. Unable to come to a consensus of candidates for awards in the Public Service category, they declared the New York Times editorial on the anniversary of the sinking of the RMS Lusitania as the winner in Editorial Writing and Herbert Bayard Swope as the winner in Reporting for his coverage of life in wartime Germany. In a letter to Swope, Williams wrote, "You did a great public service, you did it with unassuming loyalty and fidelity to the best standards of journalism, and you labor in a field where recognition ... is rarest."

The awards were issued at a time when Woodrow Wilson was a wartime president and Germanophobia was permeating society; Nicholas Murray Butler declared a moratorium on academic freedom, and dismissed two faculty members for what he perceived as disloyal behavior. The university had suspended classes during the spring term, and had established a Washington news service on campus.

Williams was named professor emeritus in 1919. He was also a trustee of Amherst College and the Constantinople College for Women from 1909 to 1919. He was the recipient of numerous honorary doctorates from institutions including the University of Pennsylvania and Brown College.

== Civic and political involvement ==
Williams was a member of the American Oriental Society and the American Philosophical Society; he served with the National Security League, and on the Committee for Organized Education; he was a member of Economic Club of New York, and was one of the featured speakers on the topic of The Regulation of Competition Versus The Regulation of Monopoly, November 1, 1912.

In 1916, when President Woodrow Wilson was campaigning for a second term, he ran on an ideology of Americanism, promising a war-weary public, that he would keep America out of involvement in World War I. In 2017, HuffPost invoked Talcott's name when reporting on Donald Trump, and his "America First," campaign; in the article, Trump Was Not First To Use "America First" Slogan, reporter Rich Rubino, noted that in 1919, Talcott had asked then Senator Boies Penrose, "What is going to be the great keynote of the Republican Party in the next presidential election?" Penrose replied saying "Americanism." When Talcott asked Penrose what that meant, Penrose replied: "Dam'd if I know, but I tell you Talcott, it is going to be a damn good word with which to carry an election."

In July 1916, Talcott wrote "America's Need For an Enforced Peace." He spoke about land acquisition in previous conflicts and referred to the European world as being predatory, recalling that in the last generation, Europe had all there was to be had, with the exception of three areas: "The Moslem area from Morocco across the south coast of the Mediterranean, the Balkans, Turkey, Arabia and Persia to Afghanistan and Beluchistan." He explained that the war was being fought "to decide the final fate of this area, much of which has already been staked out..." He went on to point out "any territories may be shifted when the conflict is won."

In 1917, Talcott wrote an editorial, published in The New York Sun as part of the American Rights League, in an effort to convince the public and the American government to join the war against Germany. He cited the sinking of the ships, the Laconia and the Lusitania, calling it a "deliberate challenge to the manhood of America." He urged the public to telegraph "the President and your Congressman urging that America shall do her part in subduing the German menace to civilization." Williams also wrote a book titled, "How the German Empire has Menaced Society," published by the National Security League, in 1917, the book was a part of the Patriotism through education series.

In 1919, President Woodrow Wilson delivered to the Senate, the Treaty of Versailles, ending World War I and establishing the League of Nations, negotiated without the input of Senate members. Most Democrats supported it, but the Republican party was divided. The Senate Majority Leader, Henry Cabot Lodge withheld approval, unless 14 reservations (amendments) were adopted. A letter was entered into the Congressional Record, with prominent signatories from most of the states; Talcott was among numerous supporters of the Treaty and formation of the League, urging the Senate to adopt the Treaty without amendments, the statement saying in part: "Peace itself, the peace of the world, is delayed until ratification comes. And any amendment postpones peace." The Senate failed to secure a two-thirds vote, with some Democrats voting nay, and the United States declined to join the League of Nations, and for the first time, the senate failed to adopt a Treaty. Later, during World War II, the U.S. joined the United Nations.

In 1920, "The Democratic Platform, A Debate by Talcott Williams and Norman Hapgood," was published with each writing their own articles, debating each other on what happened when Woodrow Wilson and the Senate could not agree on the League of Nations; Williams article was titled, "Nullifying the Constitution."

== Personal relationships and cultural pursuits ==
Williams and his wife traveled to Morocco from 1897 to 1898 and collected hundreds of objects which they donated to the Penn Museum. In 2020, fifteen of these objects were on public display. Some of the objects are pottery created in the 1890s that feature ornate, blue patterning and a shiny glaze. The collection also includes wooden carvings, clothing, food containers, Arabic manuscripts, woven baskets, and more. Williams also published two books related to historical artifacts in Morocco and China. "Historical Survivals on Morocco," and "Silver in China: and its Relation to Chinese Copper Coinage."

Williams was a good friend of artist Thomas Eakins, as well as other notable figures such as Walt Whitman, Horace Howard Furness, Robert Vonnoh, and Cecilia Beaux. His friends affectionately, referred to him as "Talk-a-lot" Williams, for his love of intellectual discussion and the cultural life he enjoyed, joining in clubs and societies. Eakins painted portraits of Williams and his wife, including a depiction of Williams in The Swimming Hole. One notable full-length portrait of Mrs. Williams remained unfinished, The Black Fan, because she refused to continue posing for it; the portrait was still exhibited, to wide acclaim.

== Selected works ==
The University of Delaware preserves a collection of Williams' papers in the Special Collections Department of its library.

- The Surroundings and Site of Raleigh's Colony, (from the annual report of the American Historical Association) Washington Printing Office, 1896.
- Tammany Hall, G.P. Putnam Sons, 1898.
- Organized labor and capital; the William L. Bull lectures for the year 1904, co-authored with Washington Gladden, George Hodges, and Francis Greenwood Peabody, George W. Jacobs & Company, 1904.
- Appreciations of Horace Howard Furness: Our Great Shakespeare Critic, Cleveland, Privately Printed, 1912.
- The Disposition of Constantinople, The Annals of the American Academy of Political and Social Science, Publication No.1140, July, 1917.
- Turkey: A World Problem of To-day, Doubleday, Page & Company, 1921.
- The Newspaperman, Charles Scribner's Sons, 1922.

Working with Frank Moore Colby, he was an editor of the New International Encyclopedia.
