= George Hodges (theologian) =

American theologian (1856–1919)

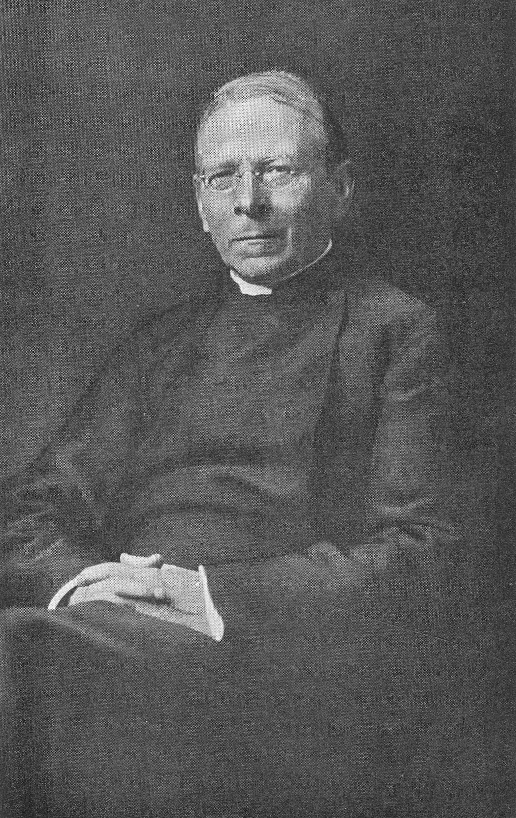
George Hodges

George Hodges (1856–1919) was an American Episcopal theologian, born at Rome, New York, and educated at Hamilton College (A.B., 1877; A.M., 1882; LL.D., 1912). He served at Calvary Church, Pittsburgh, Pennsylvania, from 1881 to 1894. In 1893 he helped establish the Kingsley Association in Pittsburgh, an organization dedicated to helping immigrant workers. Afterward, he became the dean of the Episcopal Theological School at Cambridge, Massachusetts. "The high esteem in which his religious messages are held by the reading public" resulted in a number of his books being reissued as a second edition in 1914.

== Bibliography ==
- 1892: The Episcopal Church : its doctrine, its ministry, its discipline, its worship, and its sacraments. New York : Thomas Wittaker. (OCLC 181921689)
- 1892: Christianity between Sundays. New York : T. Whittaker. (OCLC 5922481)
- 1894: The Heresy of Cain. New York : Thomas Whittaker. (OCLC 1692590)
- 1895: Massachusetts churchmanship : a paper read at a meeting of the Clerical Association in Boston, October twenty-eighth, MDCCCXCV. Cambridge : s.n. (OCLC 34914610)
- 1896: Faith and social service; eight lectures delivered before the Lowell Institute. New York : T. Whittaker. (1900, 1915) (OCLC 5059989)
- 1899: The Battles of Peace. New York : Thomas Whittaker. (1914) (OCLC 14570332)
- 1901: William Penn. Boston/New York : Houghton Mifflin and Co. (1929) (OCLC 259987653)
- 1904: Fountains Abbey : the Story of a Mediæval monastery. London : J. Murray. (OCLC 5073326)
- 1904: When the King came; stories from the four Gospels. Boston/New York : Houghton, Mifflin and Co. (OCLC 1139597)
- 1904: Organized labor and capital; the William L. Bull lectures for the year 1904 , with Washington Gladden, Talcott Williams, and Francis Greenwood Peabody
- 1904: The Human Nature of the Saints. New York : T. Whittaker. (1905, 1914) (OCLC 1465083)
- 1906: Three Hundred Years of the Episcopal Church in America. Philadelphia : Published for the Missionary Thank Offering Committee by G.W. Jacobs. (OCLC 171008)
- 1906 (with John Reichert): The administration of an institutional church : a detailed account of the operation of St. George's parish in the city of New York. New York/London : Harper & Bros. (OCLC 1464805)
- 1906: The Year of Grace (two volumes, 1906; second edition, 1914)
- 1909: The Garden of Eden
- 1909: The apprenticeship of Washington, and other sketches of significant colonial personages. New York : Moffat, Yard & Co. (OCLC 24253931)
- 1911: The Training of Children in Religion. New York : Appleton. (1912, 1914, 1917, 1919, 1923) (OCLC 590316423)
- 1911: Everyman's Religion. New York : The Macmillan Company (1913) (OCLC 504038655)
- 1912: Saints and heroes since the Middle Ages. New York : H. Holt (OCLC 259073551)
- 1913: Classbook of Old Testament History. New York : The Macmillan Co. (1914, 1915, 1917, 1918, 1923, 1925, 1932, 1937) (OCLC 378342)
