= Robert Swain Peabody =

American architect

Robert Swain Peabody F.A.I.A.
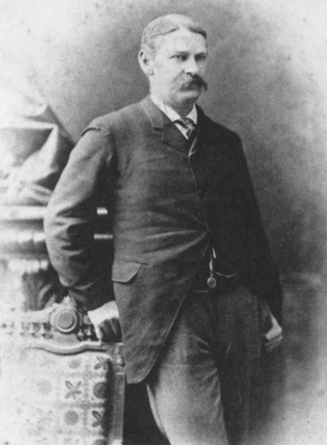
- Born: February 20, 1845; New Bedford, Massachusetts, US
- Died: September 23, 1917 (aged 72); Marblehead, Massachusetts, US
- Education: Harvard University; École des Beaux-Arts
- Occupation: Architect
- Spouses: Annie Putnam (m. 1871; died 1911) Helen Lee (m. 1913)
- Father: Rev. Ephraim Peabody
- Relatives: Rev. Francis Greenwood Peabody (brother); Charles William Eliot (brother-in-law); Henry Whitney Bellows (brother-in-law)

Architectural career
- Firm: Peabody & Stearns
- Partner: John Goddard Stearns Jr.

8th President of the American Institute of Architects
- In office 1900–1901
- Preceded by: Henry Van Brunt
- Succeeded by: Charles Follen McKim

Robert Swain Peabody (February 20, 1845 – September 23, 1917) was a prominent Boston architect who was the cofounder of the firm Peabody & Stearns.

== Early life ==
Peabody was born in New Bedford, Massachusetts, on February 20, 1845. He was a son of Ephraim Peabody and Mary Jane (née Derby) Peabody. His older sister, Ellen Derby Peabody, was the wife of Charles William Eliot, the 21st President of Harvard University. Another sister, Anna Huidekoper Peabody, was the wife of Henry Whitney Bellows, president of the United States Sanitary Commission. His younger brother was the Rev. Francis Greenwood Peabody, Dean of the Harvard Divinity School.

He attended Harvard University in Cambridge, Massachusetts, and the École nationale supérieure des Beaux-Arts in Paris.

He was in 1913 a member of Harvard's Board of Overseers.

== Career ==
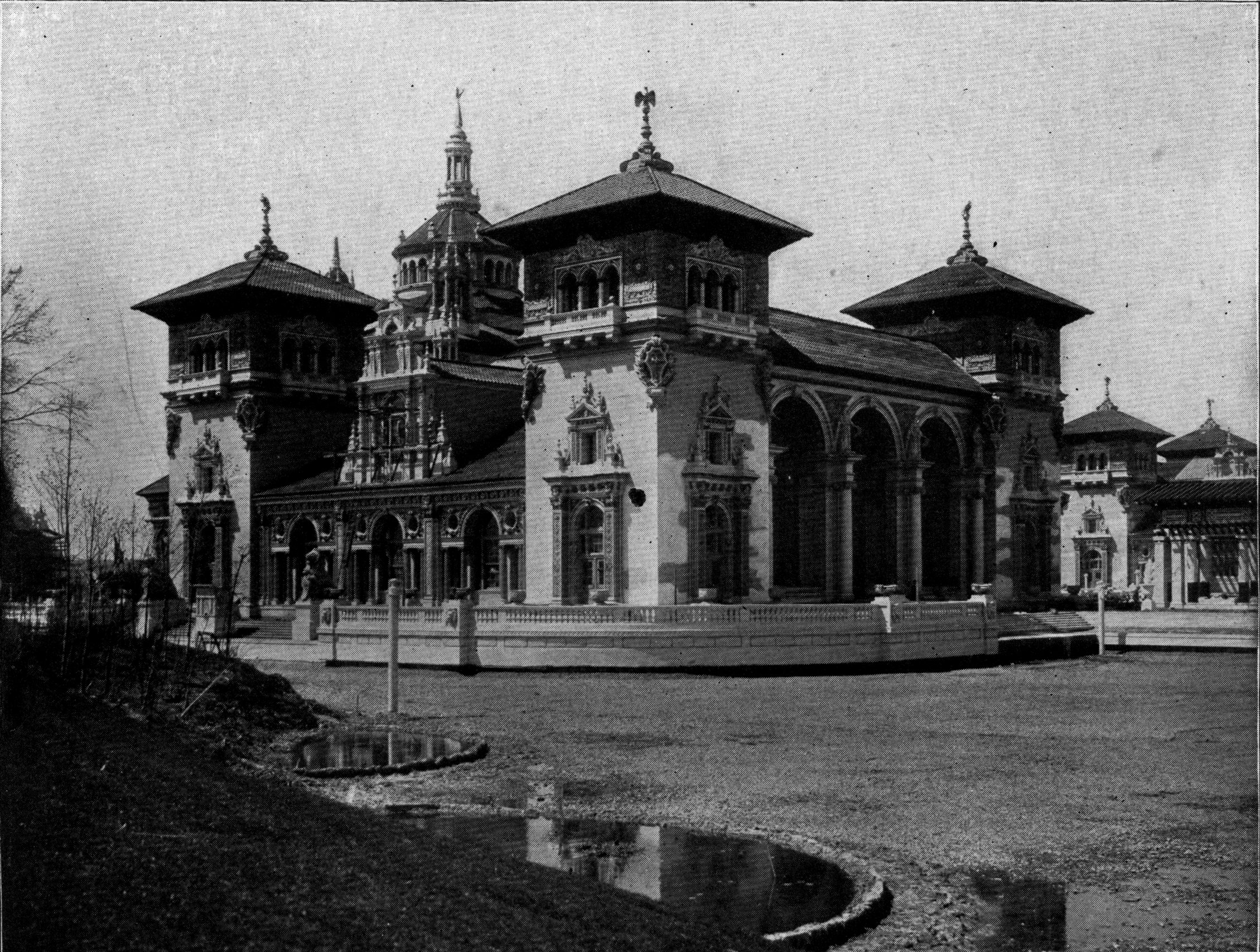
Mines Building, at the Pan-American Exposition, designed by Peabody

He was an early supporter of the Colonial Revival style and had an affection for English styles and the Picturesque Movement and Beaux-Arts architecture. He was elected an Associate of the American Institute of Architects in 1874 and a Fellow in 1889. He was president of the Institute from 1900 to 1901. He was also a member of the Society of Beaux-Arts Architects and the Boston Architectural Club. He was chairman of the Boston Park Commission.

=== Notable works ===
- Boston and Providence Railroad Station (1872; demolished)
- The Brunswick Hotel (1873) and annex (1877)
- The Boston Post Building (1874)
- The New York Mutual Life Insurance Building (1874-1875; demolished in 1945)
- The American Unitarian Association Building (1886; demolished)
- The Assumption Church in Brookline (1878-1886)
- The Exchange Building (1887)
- The Stock Exchange Building (1889-1891)
- Christ Church in Waltham (1897-1898)
- Custom House Tower (1913-1915).

== Personal life ==
On June 8, 1871, Peabody married Annie Putnam, the daughter of John Phelps Putnam, a Boston Aldermen, and Harriette (née Day) Putnam. Together, the couple had five children:

- Ellen Peabody (1872–1877), who died in childhood.
- Arthur John Peabody (1875–1875), who died in infancy.
- Katherine Putnam Peabody (1877–1908).
- Mary Derby Peabody (1881–1910), who married Henry Russell Scott in 1910.
- Robert Ephraim Peabody (b. 1887).

After the death of his first wife in 1911, he remarried to Helen Lee, daughter of Charles Carroll Lee, on January 25, 1913.

Peabody died on September 23, 1917, aged 72, in Marblehead, Massachusetts.
