= Charles William Eliot =

American academic (1834–1926)

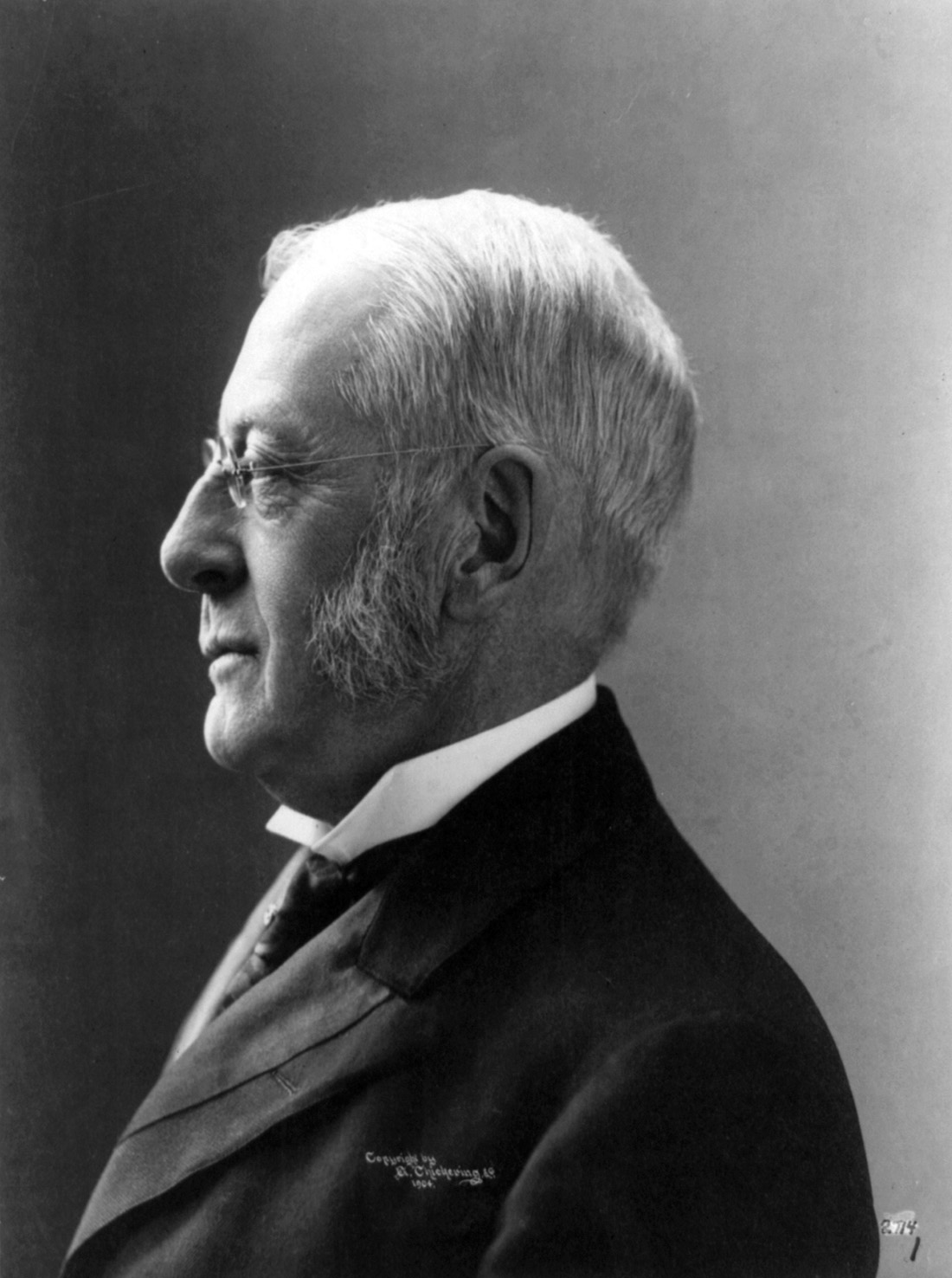
- Eliot, c. 1904

21st President of Harvard University
- In office 1869–1909
- Preceded by: Thomas Hill
- Succeeded by: A. Lawrence Lowell

Personal details
- Born: March 20, 1834 Boston, Massachusetts, U.S.
- Died: August 22, 1926 (aged 92) Northeast Harbor, Maine, U.S.
- Spouses: Ellen Derby Peabody (m. 1858–1869) Grace Mellen Hopkinson (m. 1877–1924)
- Children: Charles; Samuel II
- Parent: Samuel Atkins Eliot (father)
- Relatives: Eliot family
- Education: Harvard College
- Profession: Professor

Charles William Eliot (March 20, 1834 – August 22, 1926) was an American academic who was the president of Harvard University from 1869 to 1909, the longest term of any Harvard president. A member of the prominent Eliot family of Boston, he transformed Harvard from a respected provincial college into America's preeminent research university. Theodore Roosevelt called him "the only man in the world I envy."

== Early life and education ==
Eliot was born a scion of the wealthy Eliot family of Boston. He was the son of politician Samuel Atkins Eliot and his wife Mary (née Lyman), and was the grandchild of banker Samuel Eliot and merchant Theodore Lyman of the Lyman Estate. His grandfather was one of the wealthiest merchants of Boston. He was one of five siblings and the only boy. Eliot graduated from Boston Latin School in 1849 and from Harvard University in 1853. He was later made an honorary member of the Hasty Pudding.

Although he had high expectations and obvious scientific talents, the first fifteen years of Eliot's career were less than auspicious. He was appointed Tutor in Mathematics at Harvard in the fall of 1854, and studied chemistry with Josiah P. Cooke. In 1858, he was promoted to Assistant Professor of Mathematics and Chemistry. He taught competently, wrote some technical pieces on chemical impurities in industrial metals, and busied himself with schemes for the reform of Harvard's Lawrence Scientific School.

But his real goal, appointment to the Rumford Professorship of Chemistry, eluded him. This was a particularly bitter blow because of a change in his family's economic circumstances—the financial failure of his father, Samuel Atkins Eliot, in the Panic of 1857. Eliot had to face the fact that "he had nothing to look to but his teacher's salary and a legacy left to him by his grandfather Lyman." After a bitter struggle over the Rumford chair, Eliot left Harvard in 1863. His friends assumed that he would "be obliged to cut chemistry and go into business in order to earn a livelihood for his family." But instead, he used his grandfather's large legacy and a small borrowed sum to spend the next two years studying the educational systems of the Old World in Europe.

== Studies of European education ==
Eliot's approach to investigating European education was unusual. He did not confine his attention to educational institutions, but explored the role of education in every aspect of national life. When Eliot visited schools, he took an interest in every aspect of institutional operation, from curriculum and methods of instruction through physical arrangements and custodial services. But his particular concern was with the relation between education and economic growth:

I have given special attention to the schools here provided for the education of young men for those arts and trades which require some knowledge of scientific principles and their applications, the schools which turn out master workmen, superintendents, and designers for the numerous French industries which demand taste, skill, and special technical instruction. Such schools we need at home. I can't but think that a thorough knowledge of what France has found useful for the development of her resources, may someday enable me to be of use to my country. At this moment, it is humiliating to read the figures which exhibit the increasing importations of all sorts of manufactured goods into America. Especially will it be the interest of Massachusetts to foster by every mean in her power the manufactures which are her main strength.

Eliot understood the interdependence of education and enterprise. In a letter to his cousin Arthur T. Lyman, he discussed the value to the German chemical industry of discoveries made in university laboratories. He also recognized that, while European universities depended on government for support, American institutions would have to draw on the resources of the wealthy. He wrote to his cousin:

Every one of the famous universities of Europe was founded by Princes or privileged classes—every Polytechnic School, which I have visited in France or Germany, has been supported in the main by Government. Now this is not our way of managing these matters of education, and we have not yet found any equivalent, but republican, method of producing the like results. In our generation I hardly expect to see the institutions founded which have produced such results in Europe, and after they are established they do not begin to tell upon the national industries for ten or twenty years. The Puritans thought they must have trained ministers for the Church and they supported Harvard College—when the American people are convinced that they require more competent chemists, engineers, artists, architects, than they now have, they will somehow establish the institutions to train them. In the meantime, freedom and the American spirit of enterprise will do much for us, as in the past ....

While Eliot was in Europe, he was again presented with the opportunity to enter the world of active business. The Merrimack Mills, one of the largest textile mills in the United States, tendered him an invitation to become its superintendent. In spite of the urgings of his friends and the attractiveness of what for the time was the enormous salary of $5000 (plus a good house, rent free), Eliot, after giving considerable thought to the offer, turned it down. One of his biographers speculated that he surely realized by this time that he had a strong taste for organizing and administration. This post would have given it scope. He must have felt, even if dimly, that if science interested him, it was not because he was first and last a lover of her laws and generalizations, not only because the clarity and precision of science was congenial, but because science answered the questions of practical men and conferred knowledge and power upon those who would perform the labors of their generation.

During nearly two years in Europe he had found himself as much fascinated by what he could learn concerning the methods by which science could be made to help industry as by what he discovered about the organization of institutions of learning. He was thinking much about what his own young country needed, and his hopes for the United States took account of industry and commerce as well as the field of academic endeavor. To be the chief executive officer of a particular business offered only a limited range of influence; but to stand at the intersection of the realm of production and the realm of knowledge offered considerably more.

== Crisis in American colleges ==
In the 1800s, American colleges, controlled by clergymen, continued to embrace classical curricula that had little relevance to an industrializing nation. Few offered courses in the sciences, modern languages, history, or political economy — and only a handful had graduate or professional schools.

As businessmen became increasingly reluctant to send their sons to schools whose curricula offered nothing useful — or to donate money for their support, some educational leaders began exploring ways of making higher education more attractive. Some backed the establishment of specialized schools of science and technology, like Harvard's Lawrence Scientific School, Yale's Sheffield Scientific School, and the newly chartered Massachusetts Institute of Technology, about to offer its first classes in 1865. Others proposed abandoning the classical curriculum, in favor of more vocational offerings.

Harvard was in the middle of this crisis. After three undistinguished short-term clerical Harvard presidencies in a ten-year period, Boston's business leaders, many of them Harvard alumni, were pressing for change — though with no clear idea of the kinds of changes they wanted.

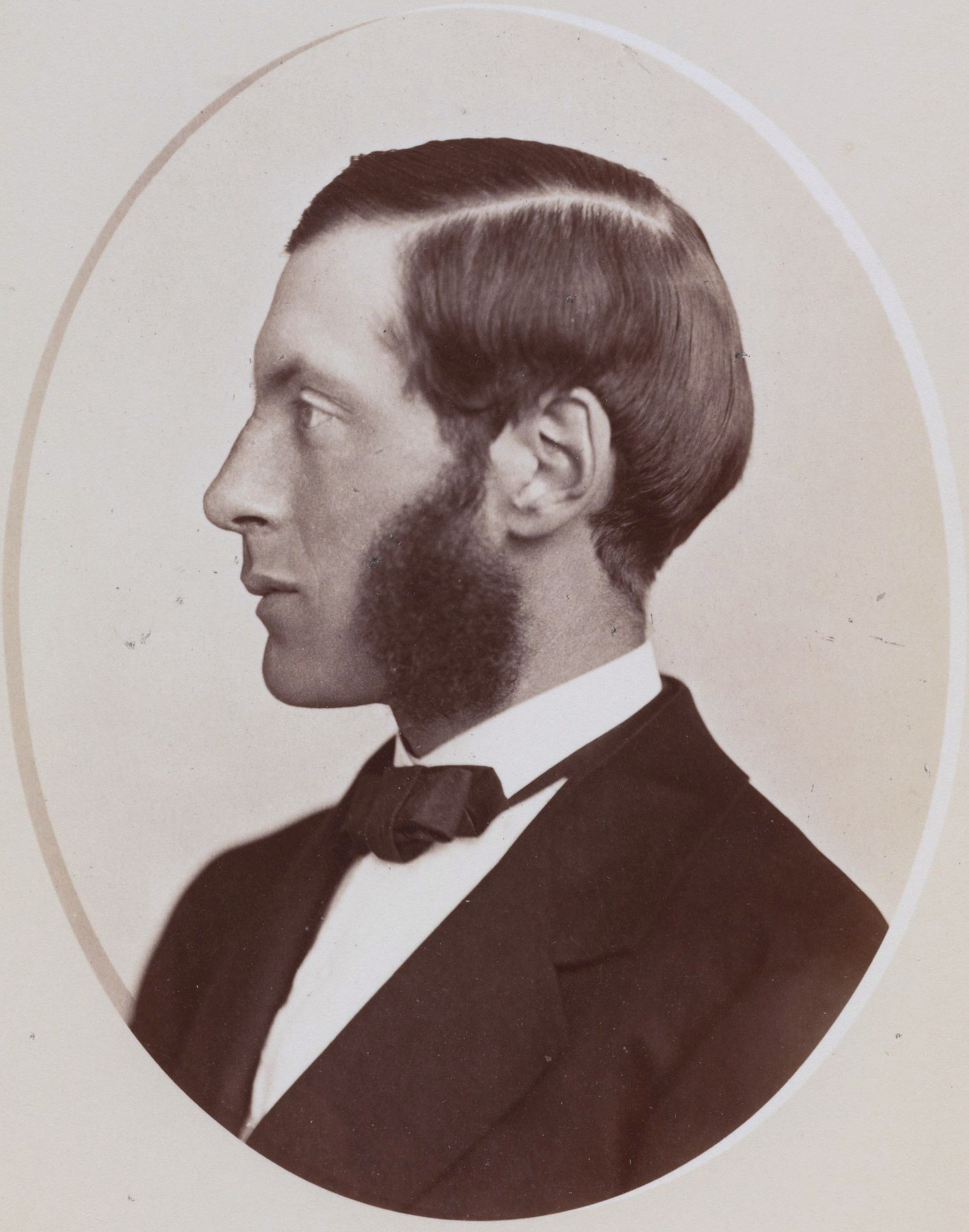
Eliot around the time of his arrival at MIT

On his return to the United States in 1865, Eliot accepted an appointment as Professor of Analytical Chemistry at the newly founded Massachusetts Institute of Technology. In that year, an important revolution occurred in the government of Harvard University. The board of overseers had hitherto consisted of the governor, lieutenant-governor, president of the state senate, speaker of the house, secretary of the board of education, and president and treasurer of the university, together with thirty other persons, and these other persons were elected by joint ballot of the two houses of the state legislature.

An opinion had long been gaining ground that it would be better for the community and the interests of learning, as well as for the university, if the power to elect the overseers were transferred from the legislature to the graduates of the college. This change was made in 1865, and at the same time the governor and other state officers ceased to form part of the board. The effect of this change was to greatly strengthen the interest of the alumni in the management of the university, and thus to prepare the way for extensive and thorough reforms. Shortly afterward Dr. Thomas Hill resigned the presidency, and after a considerable interregnum Eliot succeeded to that office in 1869.

== Harvard presidency ==
Early in 1869, Eliot had presented his ideas about reforming American higher education in a compelling two-part article, "The New Education," in The Atlantic Monthly, the nation's leading journal of opinion. "We are fighting a wilderness, physical and moral," Eliot declared in setting forth his vision of the American university, "for this fight we must be trained and armed." The articles resonated powerfully with the businessmen who controlled the Harvard Corporation. Shortly after their appearance, merely 35 years old, he was elected as the youngest president in the history of the nation's oldest university.

Eliot's educational vision incorporated important elements of Unitarian and Emersonian ideas about character development, framed by a pragmatic understanding of the role of higher education in economic and political leadership. His concern in "The New Education" was not merely curriculum, but the ultimate utility of education. A college education could enable a student to make intelligent choices, but should not attempt to provide specialized vocational or technical training.

Although his methods were pragmatic, Eliot's ultimate goal, like those of the secularized Puritanism of the Boston elite, was a spiritual one. The spiritual desideratum was not otherworldly. It was embedded in the material world and consisted of measurable progress of the human spirit towards mastery of human intelligence over nature — the "moral and spiritual wilderness." While this mastery depended on each individual fully realizing his capacities, it was ultimately a collective achievement and the product of institutions which established the conditions both for individual and collective achievement. Like the Union victory in the Civil War, triumph over the moral and physical wilderness and the establishment of mastery required a joining of industrial and cultural forces.

While he proposed the reform of professional schools, the development of research faculties, and, in general, a huge broadening of the curriculum, his blueprint for undergraduate education in crucial ways preserved — and even enhanced — its traditional spiritual and character education functions. Echoing Emerson, he believed that every individual mind had "its own peculiar constitution." The problem, both in terms of fully developing an individual's capacities and in maximizing his social utility, was to present him with a course of study sufficiently representative so as "to reveal to him, or at least to his teachers and parents, his capacities and tastes." An informed choice once made, the individual might pursue whatever specialized branch of knowledge he found congenial.

But Eliot's goal went well beyond Emersonian self-actualization for its own sake. Framed by the higher purposes of a research university in the service of the nation, specialized expertise could be harnessed to public purposes. "When the revelation of his own peculiar taste and capacity comes to a young man, let him reverently give it welcome, thank God, and take courage," Eliot declared in his inaugural address. He further stated:

Thereafter he knows his way to happy, enthusiastic work, and, God willing, to usefulness and success. The civilization of a people may be inferred from the variety of its tools. There are thousands of years between the stone hatchet and the machine-shop. As tools multiply, each is more ingeniously adapted to its own exclusive purpose. So with the men that make the State. For the individual, concentration, and the highest development of his own peculiar faculty, is the only prudence. But for the State, it is variety, not uniformity, of intellectual product, which is needful.

On the subject of educational reform, he declared:

As a people, we do not apply to mental activities the principle of division of labor; and we have but a halting faith in special training for high professional employments. The vulgar conceit that a Yankee can turn his hand to anything we insensibly carry into high places, where it is preposterous and criminal. We are accustomed to seeing men leap from farm or shop to court-room or pulpit, and we half believe that common men can safely use the seven-league boots of genius. What amount of knowledge and experience do we habitually demand of our lawgivers? What special training do we ordinarily think necessary for our diplomatists? — although in great emergencies the nation has known where to turn. Only after years of the bitterest experience did we come to believe the professional training of a soldier to be of value in war. This lack of faith in the prophecy of a natural bent, and in the value of a discipline concentrated upon a single object, amounts to a national danger.

Under Eliot's leadership, Harvard adopted an "elective system" which vastly expanded the range of courses offered and permitted undergraduates unrestricted choice in selecting their courses of study — with a view to enabling them to discover their "natural bents" and pursue them into specialized studies. A monumental expansion of Harvard's graduate and professional school and departments facilitated specialization, while at the same time making the university a center for advanced scientific and technological research. Accompanying this was a shift in pedagogy from recitations and lectures towards classes that put students' achievements to the test and, through a revised grading system, rigorously assessed individual performance.

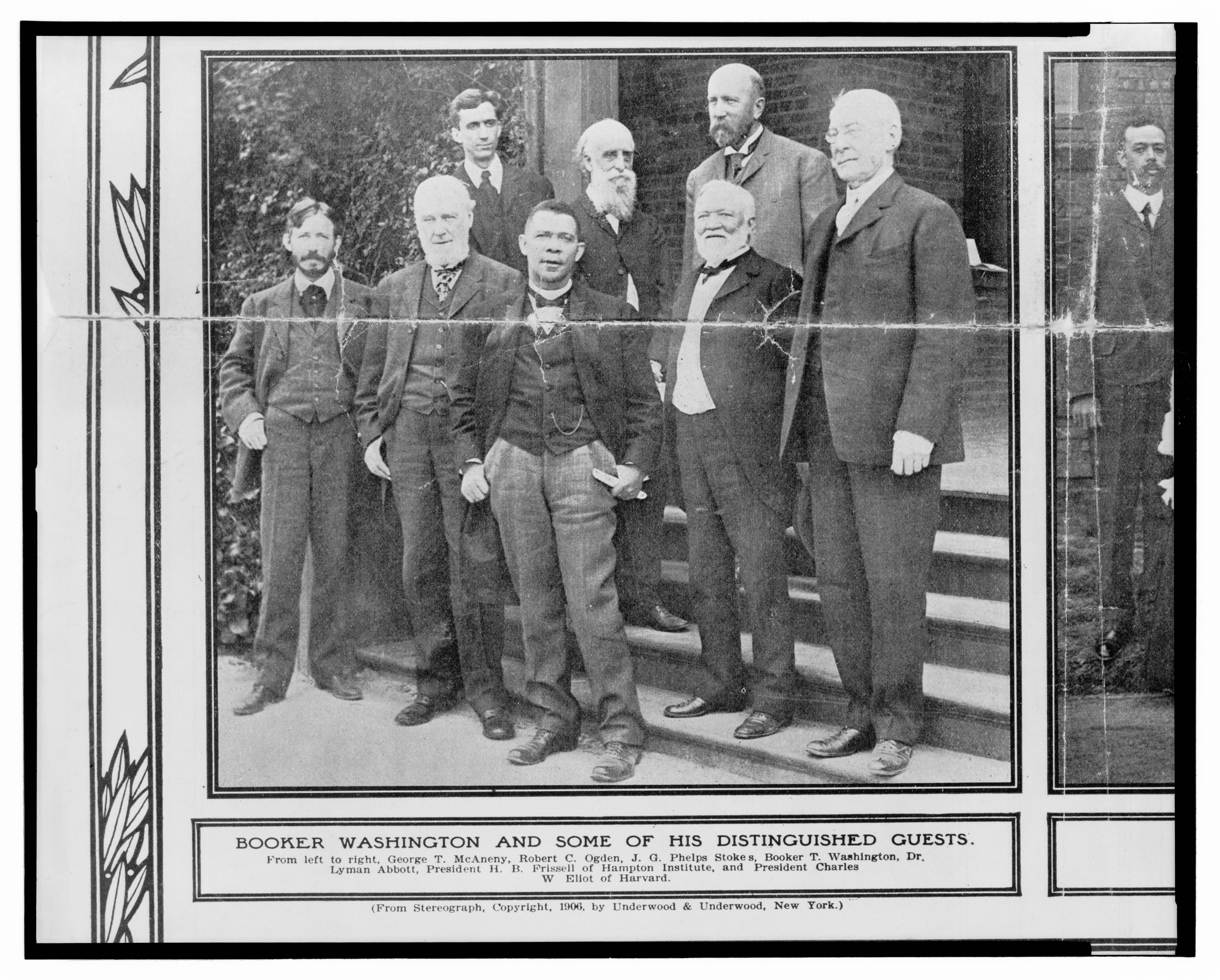
With Booker Washington and other dignitaries

Eliot's reforms did not go without criticism. His own kinsman Samuel Eliot Morison in his tercentenary history of Harvard gave an opinion that is rare among historians:

It was due to Eliot's insistent pressure that the Harvard faculty abolished the Greek requirement for entrance in 1887, after dropping required Latin and Greek for freshman year. His and Harvard's reputation, the pressure of teachers trained in the new learning, and of parents wanting ‘practical’ instruction for their sons, soon had the classics on the run, in schools as well as colleges; and no equivalent to the classics, for mental training, cultural background, or solid satisfaction in after life, has yet been discovered. It is a hard saying, but Mr. Eliot, more than any other man, is responsible for the greatest educational crime of the century against American youth—depriving him of his classical heritage.

By contrast recent scholars such as Richard M. Freeland, emphasize that Eliot appreciated how Harvard needed to modernize:

Eliot believed that the traditional college, with its rigid curriculum and preoccupation with "virtue and piety," had become irrelevant to producing successful leaders for the industrial, urban nation of the late nineteenth century. Influenced by his observations of German universities, Eliot saw that conditions favored academic institutions dedicated to the secular achievements of the intellect, places that would nurture contemporary thinking on socially significant subjects and enable ambitious, talented men to demonstrate their abilities. The former objective required a faculty composed less of faithful teachers than of productive scholars for whom the campus would provide the conditions for creative work. The latter implied a shift of focus from undergraduate, liberal education to graduate work in the most important professional fields.

=== Education of women ===
During his tenure as Harvard's president he denied women's demands to be allowed the same educational opportunities as men. In response to these demands he was quoted as saying "the world “(knows) next to nothing about the natural mental capacities of the female sex.”" Regardless of Eliot's opposition, women were able to find educational instruction through the Harvard Annex where they could receive instruction from Harvard faculty. Within a decade this program grew to 200 female students, and resulted in the creation of Radcliffe College. In the aftermath of the formation of the college, Eliot, with reservations, countersigned the degrees of women who attend Radcliffe certifying the degrees received by these students are equivalent in everyway to those received by students at Harvard. He still maintained that there must be a separation of the sexes when it came to education.

=== Race and religion ===
While Eliot was president of Harvard many firsts happened when it came to the education of African Americans. Richard Theodore Greener was the first African American to graduate from Harvard. W.E.B. Du Bois was the first African American to earn a PhD from Harvard's History Department, and from Harvard overall. Also, during his presidency, Eliot saw the hiring of Harvard's first African American faculty member George F. Grant. Yet, despite these changes Eliot continued to believe in racial segregation, anti-miscegenation, and eugenics.

Unlike his successor, A. Lawrence Lowell, Eliot opposed efforts to limit the admission of Jews and Roman Catholics.

Years after leaving the presidency, in 1924, it was reported on the front page of the Harvard Crimson that Elliot had publicly declared it "unfortunate" that growing numbers of the "Jewish race" were intermarrying with Christians.

=== Opposition to football and other sports ===
During his tenure, Eliot opposed football and tried unsuccessfully to abolish the game at Harvard. In 1905, The New York Times reported that he called it "a fight whose strategy and ethics are those of war", that violation of rules cannot be prevented, that "the weaker man is considered the legitimate prey of the stronger" and that "no sport is wholesome in which ungenerous or mean acts which easily escape detection contribute to victory."

He also made public objections to baseball, basketball, and hockey. He was quoted as saying that rowing and tennis were the only clean sports.

Eliot once said:

[T]his year I'm told the team did well because one pitcher had a fine curve ball. I understand that a curve ball is thrown with a deliberate attempt to deceive. Surely this is not an ability we should want to foster at Harvard.

=== Attempted acquisition of MIT ===
During his lengthy tenure as Harvard's leader, Eliot initiated repeated attempts to acquire his former employer, the fledgling Massachusetts Institute of Technology, and these efforts continued even after he stepped down from the presidency. The much younger college had considerable financial problems during its first five decades, and had been repeatedly rescued from insolvency by various benefactors, including George Eastman, the founder of Eastman Kodak Company. The faculty, students, and alumni of MIT often vehemently opposed merger of their school under the Harvard umbrella. In 1916, MIT succeeded in moving across the Charles River from crowded Back Bay, Boston to larger facilities on the southern riverfront of Cambridge, but still faced the prospect of merger with Harvard, which was to begin "when the Institute will occupy its splendid new buildings in Cambridge." However, in 1917, the Massachusetts Supreme Judicial Court rendered a decision that effectively cancelled plans for a merger, and MIT eventually attained independent financial stability. During his life, Eliot had been involved in at least five unsuccessful attempts to absorb MIT into Harvard.

== Personal life ==
On October 27, 1858, Eliot married Ellen Derby Peabody of Salem Massachusetts (1836–1869) in Boston at King's Chapel. Ellen was the daughter of Ephraim Peabody (1807–1856) and Mary Jane Derby (1807-1892), great-great-granddaughter of Elias Hasket Derby (1739–1799), and the sister of architect Robert Swain Peabody. They had four sons, one of whom, Charles Eliot (November 1, 1859 – March 25, 1897) became an important landscape architect, responsible for Boston's public park system. He married Mary Yale Pitkin, granddaughter of Rev. Cyrus Yale, members of the Yale family of Yale University. Another son, Samuel Atkins Eliot II (August 24, 1862 – October 15, 1950) became a Unitarian minister who was the longest-serving president of the American Unitarian Association (1900–1927) and was the first president granted executive authority of that organization.

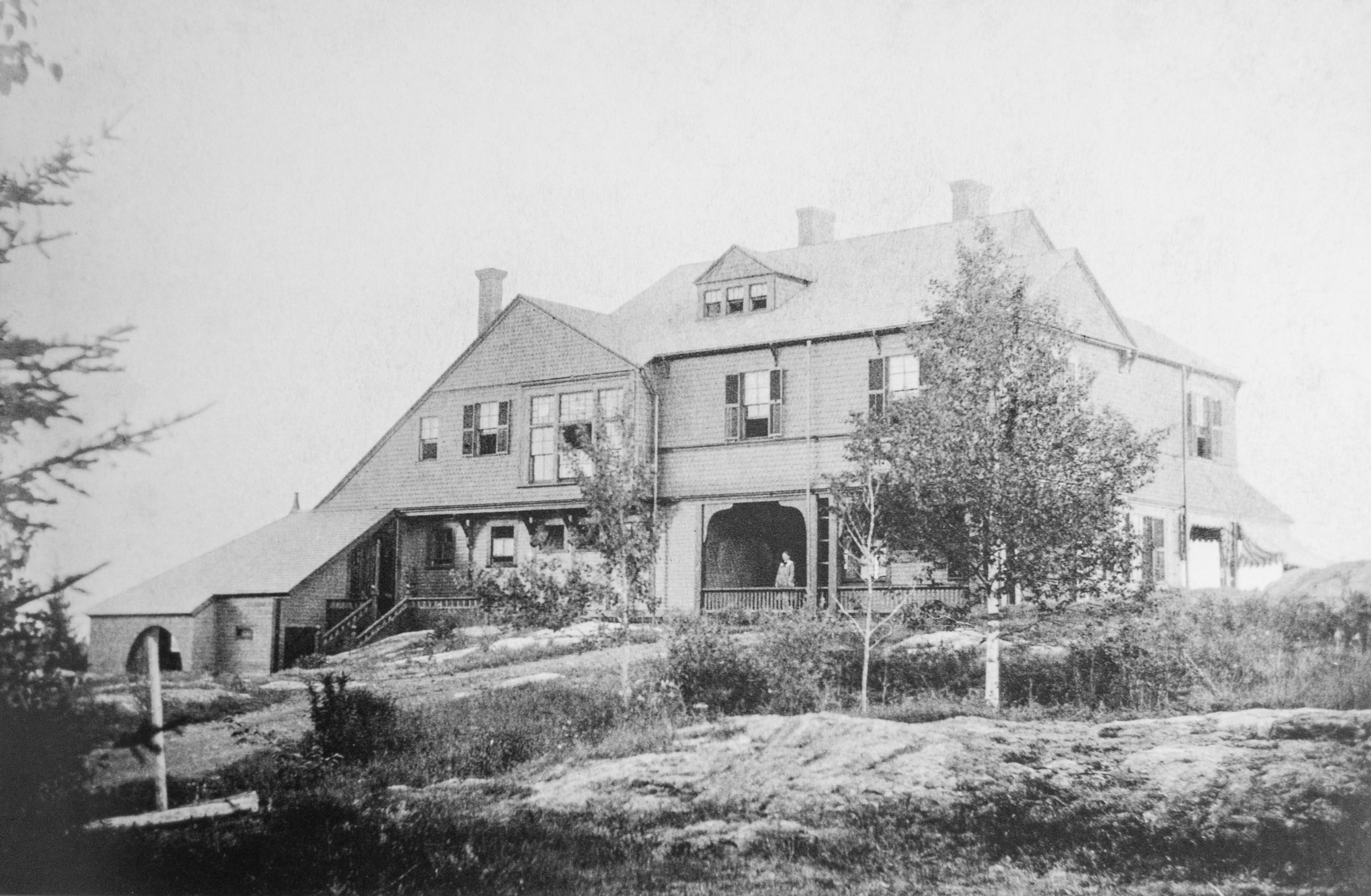
"Blueberry Ledge" – Eliot's cottage in Northeast Harbor, designed by Peabody & Stearns

The Nobel Prize-winning poet T.S. Eliot was a cousin and attended Harvard from 1906 through 1909, completing his elective undergraduate courses in three instead of the normal four years, which were the last three years of Charles' presidency.

After Ellen Derby Peabody died at the age of 33 of tuberculosis, Eliot married a second wife in 1877, Grace Mellen Hopkinson (1846–1924). This second marriage did not produce any children. Grace was a close relative of Frances Stone Hopkinson, wife of Samuel Atkins Eliot II, Charles's son.

Eliot retired in 1909, having served 40 years as president, the longest term in the university's history, and was honored as Harvard's first president emeritus. He lived another 17 years, dying in Northeast Harbor, Maine, in 1926, and was interred in Mount Auburn Cemetery in Cambridge, Massachusetts.

== Legacy ==
Under Eliot, Harvard became a worldwide university, accepting its students around America using standardized entrance examinations and hiring well-known scholars from home and abroad. Eliot was an administrative reformer, reorganizing the university's faculty into schools and departments and replacing recitations with lectures and seminars. During his forty-year presidency, the university vastly expanded its facilities, with laboratories, libraries, classrooms, and athletic facilities replacing simple colonial structures. Eliot attracted the support of major donors from among the nation's growing plutocracy, making it the wealthiest private university in the world.

Eliot's leadership made Harvard not only the pace-setter for other American schools, but a major figure in the reform of secondary school education. Both the elite boarding schools, most of them founded during his presidency, and the public high schools shaped their curricula to meet Harvard's demanding standards. Eliot was a key figure in the creation of standardized admissions examinations, as a founding member of the College Entrance Examination Board.

As leader of the nation's wealthiest and best-known university, Eliot was necessarily a celebrated figure whose opinions were sought on a wide variety of matters, from tax policy (he offered the first coherent rationale for the charitable tax exemption) to the intellectual welfare of the general public.

President Eliot edited the Harvard Classics, which together are colloquially known as his Five Foot Shelf and which were intended at the time to suggest a foundation for informed discourse, "A good substitute for a liberal education in youth to anyone who would read them with devotion, even if he could spare but fifteen minutes a day for reading."

Eliot was an articulate opponent of American imperialism.

Charles Eliot was a fearless crusader not only for educational reform, but for many of the goals of the progressive movement—whose most prominent figurehead was Theodore Roosevelt (Class of 1880) and most eloquent spokesman was Herbert Croly (Class of 1889). At the same time, Eliot was radically opposed to labor unions, fostering a campus climate where many Harvard students served as strikebreakers; he was called by some "the greatest labor union hater in the country."

Eliot was also involved in philanthropy. In 1908 he joined the General Education Board, and in 1913 served on the International Health Board, as well as serving as a trustee of the Rockefeller Foundation from 1914 to 1917. Eliot helped found the Institute for Government Research (Brookings Institution) and served as trustee. He acted as a founding trustee of the Carnegie Endowment for International Peace from its beginning in 1910 until 1919. Eliot was an incorporator of the Boston Museum of Fine Arts in 1870, and a trustee. Between 1908 and 1925 he served as the chairman of the Museum's Special Advisory Committee on Education. Served as vice president for the National Committee for Mental Hygiene from 1913 till his death. Eliot accepted election to be the first president of the American Social Hygiene Association. In 1902, he became vice president of the National Civil Service Reform League, and president of the league in 1908.

In celebration of President Eliot's 90th birthday, congratulations came in across the world and notably from two American Presidents. Woodrow Wilson said of him, “No man has ever made a deeper impression of the educational system of a country than President Eliot has upon the educational system of America,” while Theodore Roosevelt exclaimed, “He is the only man in the world I envy.”

Upon his death in 1926, The New York Times published a full-page interview that Eliot had given as he neared the end of his life, including excerpts from his writings on education, religion, democracy, labor, woman, and Americanism.

Former Harvard President, Economics Professor, and Secretary of Treasury Lawrence Summers now holds the Charles W. Eliot Emeritus University Professor position at Harvard University.

=== Inscriptions composed by Charles W. Eliot ===
Over one hundred inscriptions were composed by President Eliot, placed on buildings ranging from schools, churches, public buildings, memorial tablets, numerous monuments, and to the Library of Congress.

ON THESE HEIGHTS
DURING THE NIGHT OF MARCH 4 1776,
THE AMERICAN TROOPS BESIEGING BOSTON
BUILT TWO REDOUBTS,
WHICH MADE THE HARBOR AND TOWN
UNTENABLE BY THE BRITISH FLEET AND GARRISON.
ON MARCH 17 THE BRITISH FLEET
CARRYING 11000 EFFECTIVE MEN
AND 1000 REFUGES,
DROPPED DOWN TO NANTASKET ROADS
AND THENCEFORTH
BOSTON WAS FREE,
A STRONG BRITISH FORCE
HAD BEEN EXPELLED
FROM ONE OF THE UNITED AMERICAN COLONIES

(Evacuation Monument - Dorchester Heights Monument, Boston, Massachusetts, 1902)

TO THE MEN OF BOSTON
WHO DIED FOR THEIR COUNTRY
ON LAND AND SEA IN THE WAR
WHICH KEPT THE UNION WHOLE,
DESTROYED SLAVERY AND MAINTAINED THE CONSTITUTION.
THE GRATEFUL CITY
HAS BUILT THIS MONUMENT,
THAT THEIR EXAMPLE MAY SPEAK
TO COMING GENERATIONS

(Soldiers and Sailors Monument (Boston), Boston Common, Massachusetts, 1877)

=== Monuments and memorials ===
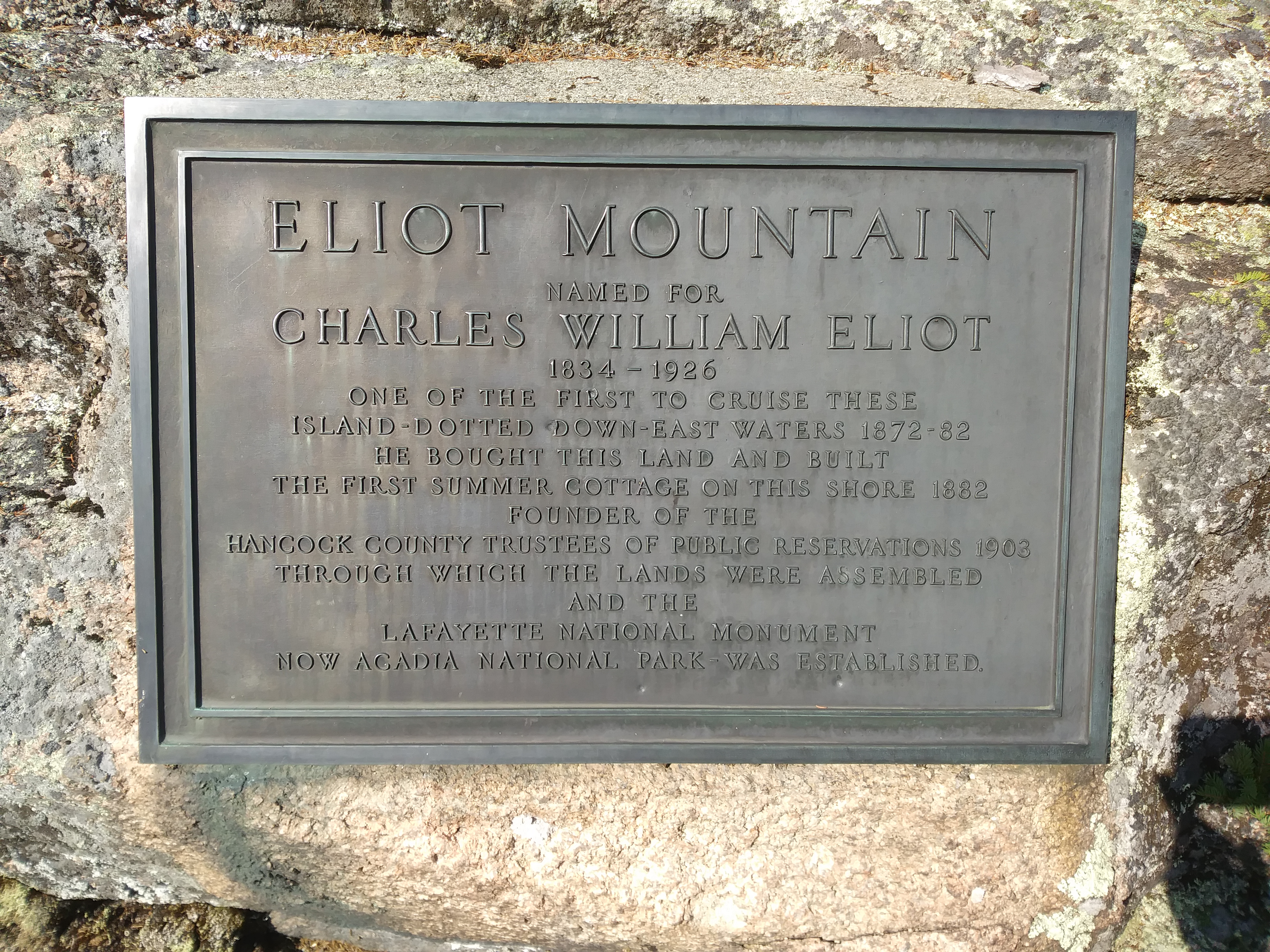
Eliot Mountain Memorial Plaque

Eliot House, one of the seven original residential houses for undergraduates at the college, was named in honor of Eliot and opened in 1931. Charles W. Eliot Middle School in Altadena, California, Eliot Elementary School in Tulsa, Oklahoma, Charles William Eliot Junior High School (now Eliot-Hine Middle School) in Washington, DC were named in his honor. In 1940 the United States Postal Service issued a stamp in Eliot's honor as part of their Famous Americans Issue. Asteroid (5202) Charleseliot is named in his honor. Eliot Mountain was named in honor of the lifelong academic who summered on Mount Desert Island, Maine, and was a key figure in the creation of Acadia National Park.

=== Honors and degrees ===
- 1857 Fellow American Academy of Arts and Sciences
- 1869 LL.D. Williams College; LL.D. Princeton University
- 1870 LL.D. Yale University
- 1871 Member American Philosophical Society
- 1873 Member Massachusetts Historical Society
- 1879 American Library Association Honorary Membership.
- 1902 LL.D. Johns Hopkins University
- 1903 Officer Legion of Honor ( France)
- 1904 Corresponding Member Academy Moral and Political Science, Institute of France
- 1908 Grand Officer Order of the Crown of Italy
- 1909 Imperial Order of the Rising Sun, 1st class; Royal Order of Merit of the Prussian Crown, 1st class; Fellow Royal Society of Literature (England); LL.D. Tulane University; LL.D. University of Missouri; LL.D. Dartmouth College; LL.D. Harvard University; MD. (hon.) Harvard University
- 1911 Ph.D. (hon.) University of Breslau
- 1914 Corresponding Fellow of the British Academy; LL.D. Brown University
- 1915 Gold Medal / American Academy of Arts and Letters
- 1919 Order of the Crown of Belgium
- 1923 Grand Cordon of the Order of St. Sava, Serbia; LL.D. Boston University; Civic Forum Medal of Honor, New York
- 1924 Roosevelt Medal for Distinguished Service; Commander of the Legion of Honor (France); LL.D. University of the State of New York

=== Books ===
- Educational Reform: Essays and Addresses (1901)
- The Conflict between Individualism and Collectivism in a Democracy (1910)
- The Training for an Effective Life (1915)

== See also ==
- History of the Massachusetts Institute of Technology
- Lawrence Scientific School

== Notes ==
Academic offices
Preceded by Thomas Hill	President of Harvard University; 1869–1909	Succeeded by A. Lawrence Lowell
