= Ephraim Peabody =

American clergyman (1807–1856)

The Reverend Ephraim Peabody III
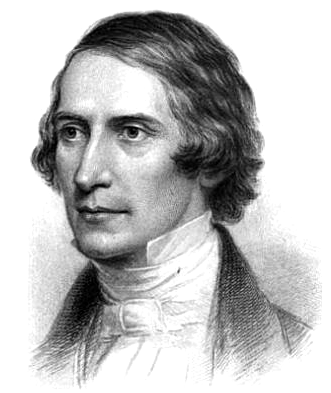

Personal details
- Born: March 22, 1807 Wilton, New Hampshire
- Died: November 28, 1856 (aged 49) Boston, Massachusetts
- Denomination: Unitarianism
- Spouse: Mary Jane Derby
- Children: 7, including Robert Swain Peabody and Francis Greenwood Peabody
- Education: Bowdoin College; Harvard Divinity School
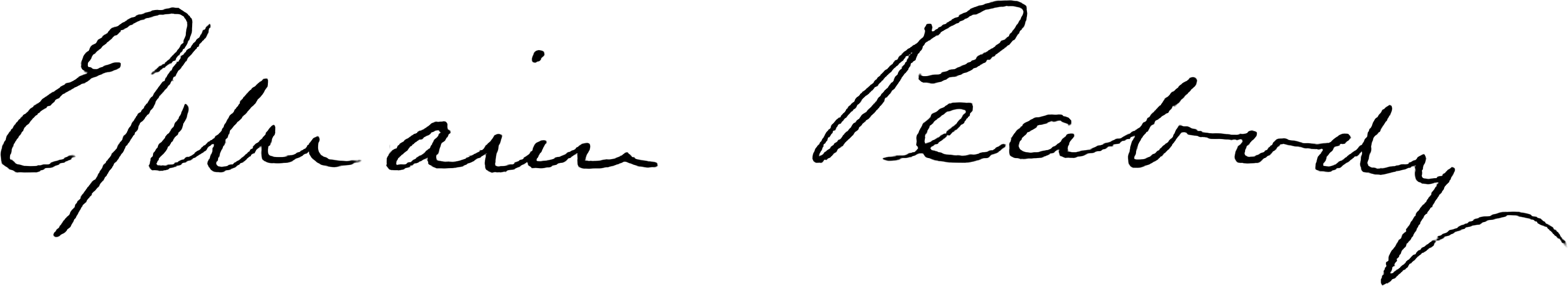
- Signature
- Relatives: Benjamin Abbot (uncle); Elias Hasket Derby (father-in-law); Charles William Eliot (son-in-law); Henry Whitney Bellows (son-in-law)

Minister of King's Chapel, Boston
- In office 1845–1856
- Preceded by: F. W. P. Greenwood

Pastor of the First Congregational Society of New Bedford
- In office 1837–1845

Pastor of the First Congregational Church of Cincinnati
- In office 1832–1836

Pastor of the Parish of Meadville, Pennsylvania
- In office 1830–1832

Ephraim Peabody (March 22, 1807 – November 28, 1856) was an American Unitarian clergyman, preacher, and philanthropist who was one of the founders of the Provident Institution for Savings in Boston. Peabody also founded a school for adults who had been denied an education. He was also dedicated to developing measures for the relief of the poor.

== Biography ==
Peabody was born March 22, 1807, in Wilton, New Hampshire, to Ephraim Peabody II and Ruth Abbot. His father was the village blacksmith, died young in 1816, leaving his mother, Ruth, to raise him and his sister. He attended school for a year at Byfield Academy and then went to Phillips Exeter Academy, which was at that time headed by his uncle, Benjamin Abbot.

Peabody attended Bowdoin College and graduated in 1827. Afterwards, he studied theology in Cambridge, Massachusetts, at Harvard Divinity School, graduating in 1830. He then moved to Meadville, Pennsylvania, to tutor the family of Harm Jan Huidekoper and began his preaching career. In 1832, he accepted a call to preach at the First Unitarian Church congregation in Cincinnati, Ohio. Here he began a long association with Louisville minister James Freeman Clarke, with whom he started a Unitarian periodical, The Western Messenger. In the summer of 1835, while visiting Boston, Massachusetts, Peabody suffered a lung hemorrhage caused by tuberculosis and the death of his first son. Although he returned to Cincinnati, he could not continue his pastoral duties and spent the following winter preaching in Mobile, Alabama. He resigned from the Cincinnati congregation in 1836 and spent the next winter back in Mobile.

During the summer of 1837, Peabody returned to Boston and preached at the Federal Street Church. Soon after, he was offered a position at the First Congregational Society in New Bedford, Massachusetts, alongside Rev. John H. Morison. While in New Bedford, he lost two more children. He resigned from the New Bedford congregation in 1845 and was called to preach at King's Chapel in Boston, where he was pastor for the remainder of his life. A parishioner of Peabody's at King's Chapel said:

In one respect, he was the most remarkable man it has been my fortune to meet, and that was in the union of a childlike simplicity with a singular knowledge of men. His judgments on the characters of those with whom he came in contact were wonderful. All shams, all pretence, all mere outside coverings, seemed to fall at once before his gentle eye; and though his opinions were announced with great caution, and he always took the most lenient view possible, yet it was clear he understood perfectly well the real character of those whom he knew. The affection which he inspired in the people of his parish has never been surpassed.

Peabody was often the public orator or poet for both the city of Boston and the Unitarian denomination. In 1852, he delivered the commencement poem to Bowdoin College.

In 1853, Peabody travelled to Europe to improve his health and spent the winter of 1855 and 1856 in St. Augustine, Florida, with the same object.

Peabody was one of the founders of the Provident Institution for Savings, which was the first chartered savings bank in the United States. In Boston, he was editor of The Christian Register, a Unitarian periodical journal. He also founded a school for adults whose education had been neglected and developed plans for the Boston school system.

While serving at King's Chapel, Peabody officiated the marriage of renowned Boston portrait-painter William Morris Hunt to Louise Perkins in 1855. His sermons and a memoir were published in 1857, and a volume of his writings, entitled Christian Days and Thoughts, was published in 1858.

Peabody suffered another lung hemorrhage in the summer of 1855, which caused him to retire from preaching. Peabody's last public appearance was later that year, when he gave a memorial sermon at his friend Judge Charles Jackson's funeral.

== Family and death ==
In 1833, Peabody married Mary Jane Derby, the daughter of Elias Hasket Derby. Together, they had seven children, three of whom died in childhood:

- Samuel A. Peabody (1834–1836)
- Ellen Derby Peabody (1836–1869)—married Charles William Eliot
- Anna Huidekoper Peabody (1838–1920)—married Henry Whitney Bellows
- George Derby Peabody (1840–1842)
- Emily Morison Peabody (1842–1845)
- Robert Swain Peabody (1845–1917)—notable Boston architect of Peabody & Stearns and President of the American Institute of Architects
- Rev. Francis Greenwood Peabody (1847–1936)—Unitarian minister and theology professor at Harvard University

Ephraim Peabody died in Boston, Massachusetts, on November 28, 1856, at the age of 49.
