= Caroline Bartlett Crane =

American cleric, suffragist and educator

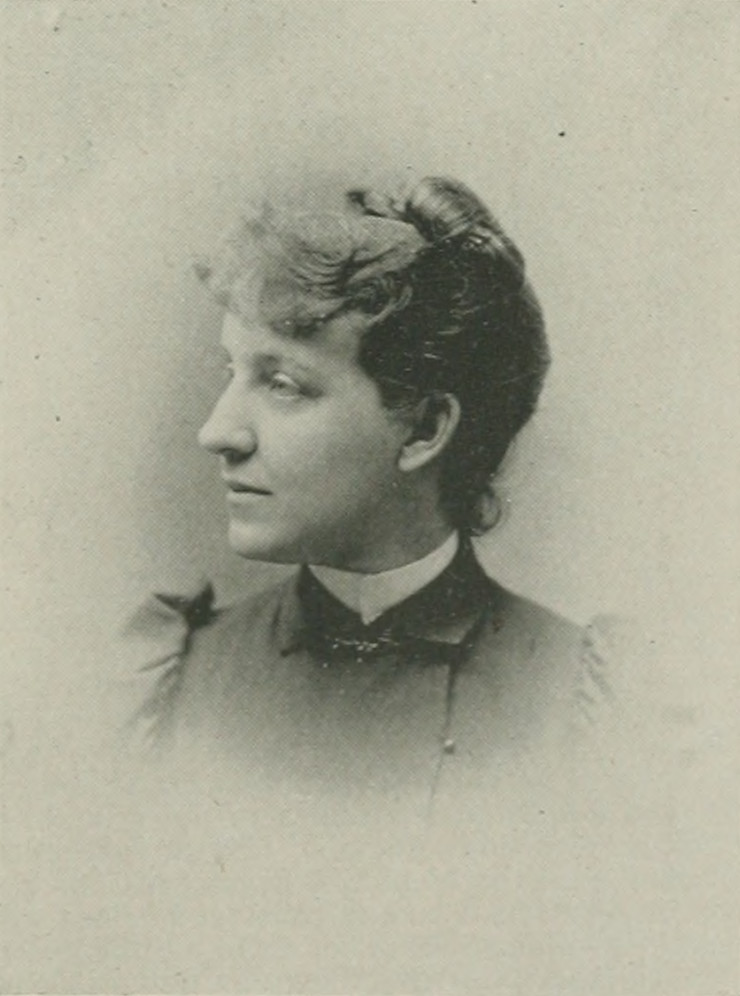
"A Woman of the Century"

Caroline Bartlett Crane (August 17, 1858 – March 24, 1935) was an American Unitarian minister, suffragist, civic reformer, educator and journalist. She was known as "America's housekeeper" for her efforts to improve urban sanitation.

== Family and education ==
Caroline Julia Bartlett was born in Hudson, Wisconsin, the daughter of Lorenzo Dow Barlett and Julia A. (Brown) Bartlett. She studied at Carthage College, graduating in 1879.

In 1896, she married Augustus Warren Crane, a doctor and pioneer of X-ray research.

== Career ==
After being a teacher for four years, Crane turned to journalism in 1884, working for three years at the Minneapolis Tribune and later as city editor for the Oshkosh Daily Morning Times.

In 1889 she was ordained and became pastor of a Unitarian church in Sioux Falls, South Dakota. After three years, her success in that post led to her accepting the pastorship of a larger Unitarian church in Kalamazoo, Michigan. In the summer of 1891 she visited England, where she preached in numerous churches, met with theologian James Martineau, and investigated the slum work of the Salvation Army. On her return to Kalamazoo, she renamed her church the People's Church and moved it into a new building designed to offer a wide range of community amenities. In 1898, after illness and differences with the board, she resigned her ministry.

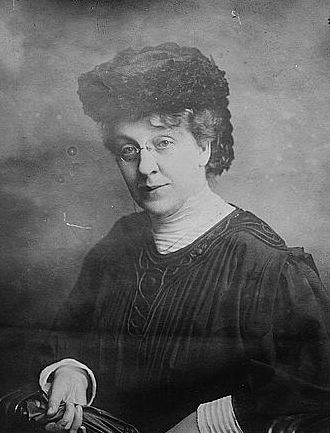
Crane (1912)

Turning to public health and sanitation reform, Crane successfully campaigned for meat inspection ordinances after discovering unsanitary conditions in local slaughterhouses. She founded the Women's Civic Improvement League in 1903–1904, with a Charity Organizations Board as a referral agency for charity cases. She wrote sanitary surveys for other cities as a professional consultant, and by 1917 had inspected sixty-two cities in fourteen states.

She died in Kalamazoo aged 76, and her ashes were buried in Mountain Home Cemetery in Kalamazoo.

== Selected works ==
- General sanitary survey of Erie, Pennsylvania, 1910
- Report on a campaign to awaken public interest in sanitary and sociologic problems in the State of Minnesota, 1911
- A sanitary survey of Saginaw, Michigan, 1911
- Business versus the home, 1913
- Everyman's house, 1925
