= Francis Greenwood Peabody =

American church minister (1847–1936)

The Reverend Francis Greenwood Peabody
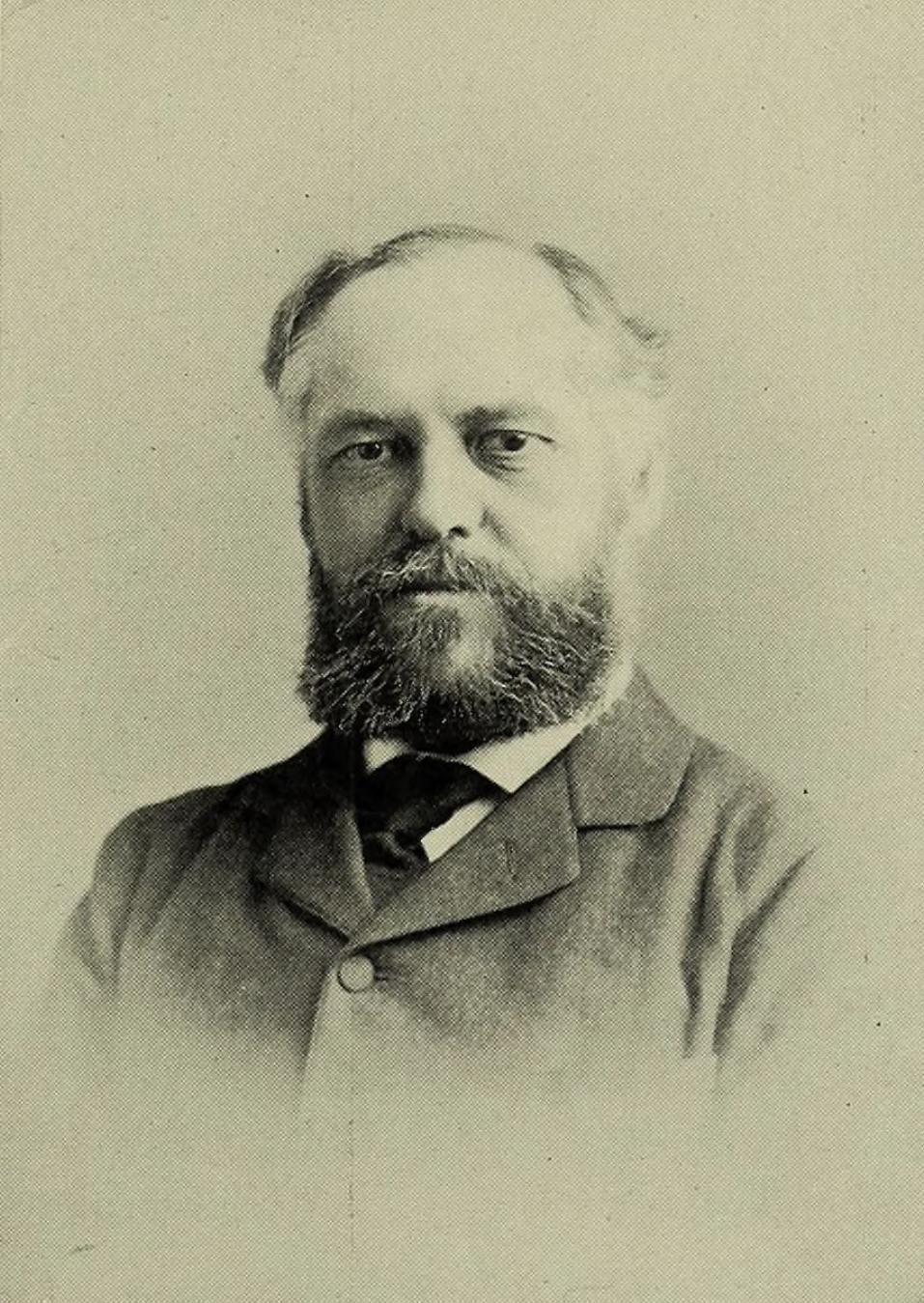
- Born: December 4, 1847; Boston, Massachusetts, U.S.
- Died: December 28, 1936 (aged 89); Cambridge, Massachusetts, U.S.
- Spouse: Cora Weld (m. 1872; died 1914)
- Parents: Ephraim Peabody; Mary Jane Derby Peabody

Ecclesiastical career
- Religion: Christianity (Unitarian)
- Ordained: 1874

Academic background
- Education: Harvard University
- Influences: Otto Pfleiderer; August Tholuck

Academic work
- Discipline: Theology
- Sub-discipline: Christian ethics
- School or tradition: Social Gospel
- Institutions: Harvard University

Francis Greenwood Peabody (1847–1936) was an American Unitarian minister and theology professor at Harvard University.

Peabody was born on December 4, 1847, in Boston, Massachusetts. He graduated from Harvard University in 1869. When a junior, "he was first baseman in the first Harvard nine to play against Yale." He then went to the Harvard Divinity School, graduating in 1872 with the degrees of AM and STB.

Peabody died in his Cambridge, Massachusetts, home on December 28, 1936.

== Works ==
- Jesus Christ and the Christian Character by Francis Greenwood Peabody ISBN 0-559-60371-1
- The Christian Life in the Modern World by Francis Greenwood Peabody ISBN 1-110-61593-0
- The Religious Education of an American Citizen by Francis Greenwood Peabody ISBN 1-110-58699-X
- Organized Labor and Capital: The William L. Bull Lectures for the Year 1904 , with Washington Gladden, Talcott Williams, and George Hodges
- Afternoons in the College Chapel by Francis Greenwood Peabody 1898

== Translations ==
- Happiness: Essays on the meaning of life, by Karl Hilty (1903)

Academic offices
Preceded by Lyman Abbott	Lyman Beecher Lecturer; 1904	Succeeded by Charles Reynolds Brown
Preceded by L. P. Jacks	Hibbert Lecturer; 1925	Succeeded by
