= Galley (surname) =

Galley is a surname. Notable people with the surname include:

- Garry Galley, former National Hockey League player
- Gordon Galley, English footballer
- Jim Galley (1944–2012), an English former cricketer and rugby union player
- John Galley, English footballer
- Maurice Galley, English footballer
- Mel Galley (1948–2008), English guitarist
- Robert Galley (politician) (1921–2012), French politician
- Roy Galley, British politician
- William Galley, English footballer
