= Galos =

Galos may refer to:

- Gálos, the Hungarian name of the town of Gols, Austria

== People with the surname ==
- Adam Galos (1924–2013), Polish historian
- Giselle Galos, 19c. musician and composer

== See also ==
- Galo (disambiguation)
- Gallo (disambiguation)
