= Gallong =

Gallong, or more commonly Galo, may refer to:

- Galo people of Arunachal Pradesh, Northeast India
- Galo language or Adi language, the Tibeto-Burman language spoken by them

Galong may refer to:

- Galong, New South Wales, a town in New South Wales, Australia
- Galong railway station, a closed railway station once serving the town

== See also ==
- Galo (disambiguation)
