= Gaul (disambiguation) =

Gaul was an ancient region of Western Europe inhabited by Celts.

== Gaul ==
Gaul may also refer to:

- Gaul (surname), a surname
- FV Gaul, a British trawler lost at sea in 1974
- Gauls, the native Celtic population of Gaul
- Roman Gaul, the region as part of the Roman Empire
- Diocese of Gaul of the Roman Empire in the 4th–5th centuries A.D.

== GAUL ==
The acronym GAUL may refer to:

- Global Administrative Unit Layers, a project by the FAO to map all administrative units in the world.

== See also ==
- Point au Gaul
- Gallo (disambiguation)
- Galle (disambiguation)
- Gall (disambiguation)
