= Rocky Ponds railway station =

Former railway station in New South Wales, Australia

Rocky Ponds

General information
- Location: Linden Road, Galong; New South Wales; Australia
- Coordinates: 34°34′52″S 148°30′09″E
- Operator: Department of Railways
- Line: Main Southern
- Distance: 371.70 km (230.96 mi) from Central
- Platforms: 2 (2 side)
- Tracks: 2

Construction
- Structure type: Ground

Other information
- Status: Demolished

History
- Opened: 12 March 1877 (149 years ago)
- Closed: 9 March 1975 (51 years ago)
- Rebuilt: 16 April 1916 (110 years ago)

Services
Preceding station	Former services	Following station
Cunningar towards Albury	Main Southern Line	Galong towards Sydney
Location

Rocky Ponds railway station was a regional railway station located on the Main Southern line, serving the Southern Tablelands town of Galong. The station was moved from its first location when the railway line was duplicated in the 1910s.

== History ==
The first Rocky Ponds station was opened in March 1877 when the Main Southern railway line was extended from Binalong to Harden, though a platform for passengers was not provided until 1 September 1880. The station was named for the nearby Rocky Ponds Creek.

On 23 May 1887, a railway guard named Thomas Moloney was thrown from a train and over a railway bridge located near Rocky Ponds station, breaking his neck. His body was found three hours later, and an inquest into the event deemed his death an accident.

As part of duplication works from 1915 to 1916, a junction branching from the main line was constructed south of Galong railway station called Galong Temporary Junction, and another called Rocky Ponds Temporary Junction was constructed north of Cunningar. This deviation allowed a double track line to be constructed but meant that the original Rocky Ponds station would no longer be used. The original station was closed on 16 April 1916, and the new station built on the deviation was opened on the same day.

On 30 June 1948, the South-West Mail train derailed near Rocky Ponds station due to a break in the rail on the line. Four passengers were killed and twenty others were injured. The derailment recorded the first railway fatalities in New South Wales since the Murulla rail accident in 1926.

Rocky Ponds was closed to passenger services in March 1975, and the station was subsequently demolished. No trace of the station remains extant.

== Description ==
Before the construction of the passenger platform, the first station only consisted of a watertank and siding where trains could pass each other along the single-track line.

The second station consisted of two brick side platforms with small wooden station shelters located on each platform. Two tracks ran through the station, with no siding provided at the new location.
