= Galle (disambiguation) =

Galle is a town in southwestern Sri Lanka.

Galle may also refer to:

- Galle (surname)
- Galle District, in southern Sri Lanka
- Gallé, Mali, a small town in Southwestern Mali
- Galle (lunar crater)
- Galle (Martian crater), also known as the "happy face crater"
- 2097 Galle, an asteroid

== See also ==
- Galle Trilingual Inscription, a stone tablet erected in 1411 in Galle, Sri Lanka
- Gall (disambiguation)
- Galley (disambiguation)
- Galli (disambiguation)
- Gally (disambiguation)
- Gaul (disambiguation)
