= Galley (disambiguation) =

A galley is a type of ship optimised for propulsion by oars.

Galley may also refer to:

- Galley (kitchen), the compartment of a ship, train, or aircraft where food is cooked and prepared
- Galley (surname), including a list of people with the name
- Galley Museum, in Tasmania, Australia
- Lymphad, or galley, a charge used primarily in Scottish heraldry

== See also ==
- Galle (disambiguation)
- Galli (disambiguation)
- Gally (disambiguation)
- Galley division, a mathematical technique
- Galley proof, a preliminary version of a publication
  - NetGalley, a web site for distribution of digital galley proofs
- Galley slave, a slave rowing in a galley
- Galija ('Galley'), a Serbian rock band
- Birlinn, or West Highland galley, a wooden vessel propelled by sail and oar
