= Galo =

Galo may refer to:

== People ==
- Galo (footballer) (Armando de Almeida, 1893–1978), Brazilian footballer
- Galo Blanco (born 1976), Spanish tennis player
- Galo Canote (born 1970), American Artist
- Galo Chiriboga, Ecuadorian lawyer, politician and administrator
- Galo Galecio (1906–1993), Ecuadorian painter, sculptor, caricaturist and printmaker
- Galo Ocampo (1913–1985), Filipino artist
- Galo René Pérez (1923–2008), Ecuadorian writer, poet, literary critic, biographer and college instructor
- Galo Plaza (1906–1987), President of Ecuador and Secretary General of the Organization of American States
- Galo Vásquez (born 1957), Ecuadorian footballer
- Diego Galo (footballer, born 1984), Brazilian footballer
- Diego Galo (footballer, born 2005), Brazilian footballer
- Evelina Galo, Croatian handball player
- Igor Galo (born 1948), Serbian and Croatian actor
- João Galo (born 1961), Portuguese footballer
- Mandla Galo (born 1962), South African politician, president of the African Independent Congress
- Orlando Galo (born 2000), Costa Rican footballer
- Rodrigo Galo (born 1986), Brazilian footballer

== Other uses ==
- Galo people of Arunachal Pradesh, India
- Galo language, the Tibeto-Burman language spoken by the Galo people
- Galo, Central African Republic, a village
- Clube Atlético Mineiro, a Brazilian football club nicknamed Galo (Portuguese for "Rooster"), based in Belo Horizonte, Minas Gerais
- Galo Futebol Americano, an American football team based in Belo Horizonte, Minas Gerais, Brazil

== See also ==
- Gallo (disambiguation)
- Galos (disambiguation)
- Gallong (disambiguation)
