= Gall (disambiguation) =

Gall is a kind of swelling growth on plants.

Gall may also refer to:

== Culture and politics ==
- Gall v. United States, a United States Supreme Court case about criminal sentencing
- A term used by Gaels to describe foreigners, associated with Norse-Gaels

== People ==
- Gall (surname), list of people with the surname
- Gall (Native American leader) (c. 1840–1894), Hunkpapa Lakota war leader
- Saint Gall (c. 550–c. 646), Irish disciple

== Other uses ==
- Galling, a form of metal wear when two surfaces slide across one another
- Bile, a fluid that aids in digestion
- Colocynth, the bitter apple or vine of Sodom
- Boldness or chutzpah, a personal characteristic of fearlessness and effrontery

== See also ==
- Gallbladder
- Gaul (disambiguation)
- Galle (disambiguation)
- Gal (disambiguation)
