= Galong railway station =

Historic site in New South Wales, Australia

Galong
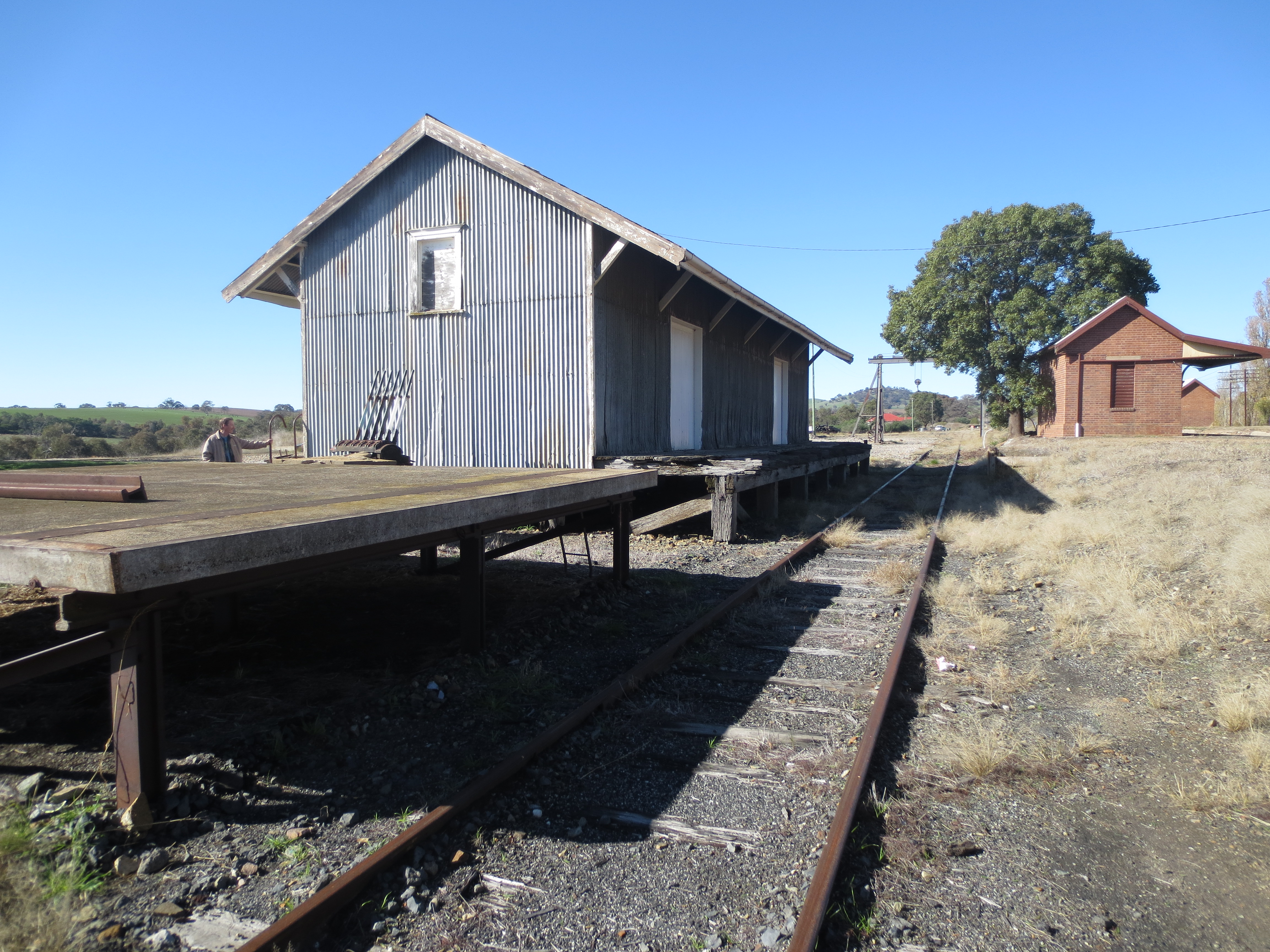
- Derelict loading platform and warehouse at the industrial sidings yard at Galong Railway Station (c. 2016).

General information
- Location: Crescent Street, Galong, New South Wales; Australia
- Coordinates: 34°36′14″S 148°33′30″E
- Operator: Public Transport Commission
- Line: Main South line
- Distance: 323.6 kilometres (201.1 mi) from Central
- Platforms: 2 (2 side)
- Tracks: 2

Construction
- Structure type: Ground

Other information
- Status: Closed

History
- Opened: 1916
- Closed: 1974

Services
| Preceding station | Former services | Following station |
|---|---|---|
| Rocky Ponds towards Albury | Main Southern Line | Binalong towards Sydney |
| St Michaels towards Boorowa | Boorowa Line | Terminus |
Location

Galong railway station is a heritage-listed closed railway station located on the Main South railway line in New South Wales, Australia. It served the village of Galong. It was added to the New South Wales State Heritage Register on 2 April 1999.

== History ==
The original station opened in 1877. However, it was replaced by a new station on a deviation which opened in 1916. Galong was the location of the junction of the branch railway to Boorowa, which closed to passenger services in 1974.

== Description ==
The station complex consists of two initial island side platform station buildings of a type 11 design with brick platforms, dating from 1915, a brick out of shed on the southbound platform, also dating from 1915, and a 61 by 16 feet (18.6 by 4.9 m) goods shed of a side shed sub-type 3 design. A T208 10 ton gantry crane also forms part of the heritage listing.

A 14062 Pooley 20 ton was formerly at the station but is no longer extant, possibly removed c. 1993 with transfer of part of the railway land to GrainCorp.

== Heritage listing ==
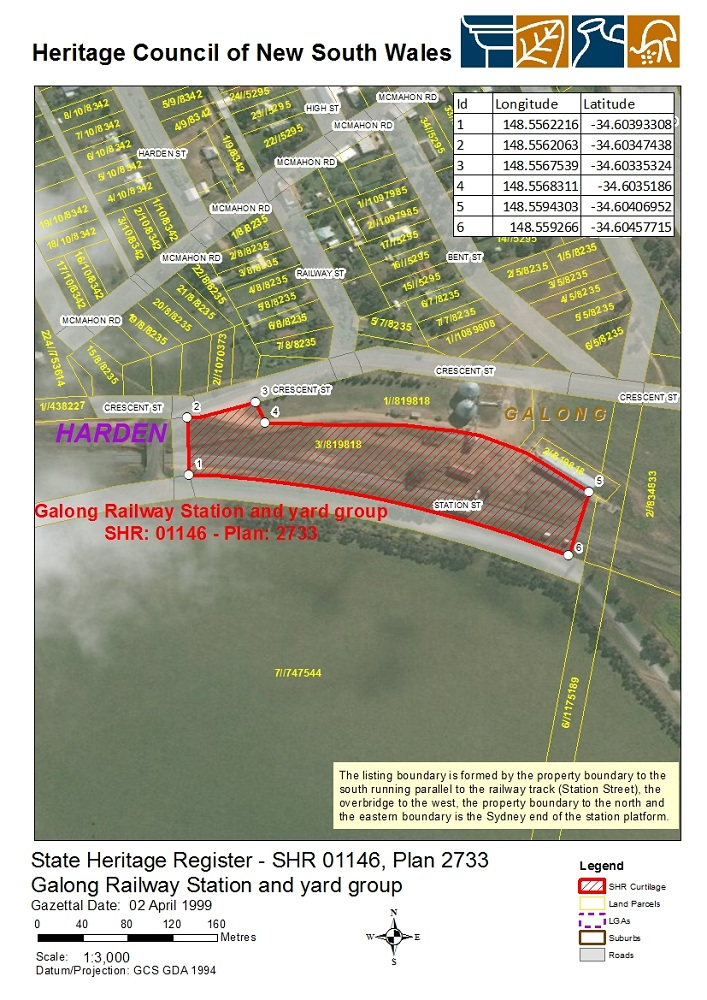
Heritage boundaries

Galong station and yard group is an excellent example of a location which was constructed largely at the same time and retains that form to the present day. It is a good example of deviation site where the former wayside platform was replaced with 2 platforms and 2 buildings when the line was duplicated and deviated in 1915. The station buildings are excellent examples of standard buildings constructed in a country location, only a few of which survive (e.g. Binalong). It is a good and rare surviving country example of a signal box constructed as part of the main station building, again a result of the common building time of the structures. As a junction station for the Boorowa branch (now closed) the site had an importance that is reflected in the quality of the structures, particularly for buildings built as late as 1915 when most locations were suffering from cutbacks and rationalised construction. It is one of the finest country examples of buildings from this period. The ancillary structures such as weighbridge, gantry crane and goods shed are significant to the whole and are good examples of their type, strengthening the significance of the group. The residence is a remnant of the original 1877 station and is significant because of this connection.

Galong railway station was listed on the New South Wales State Heritage Register on 2 April 1999 having satisfied the following criteria.

The place possesses uncommon, rare or endangered aspects of the cultural or natural history of New South Wales.

This item is assessed as historically rare. This item is assessed as arch rare. This item is assessed as socially rare.
