= Frank Rusconi =

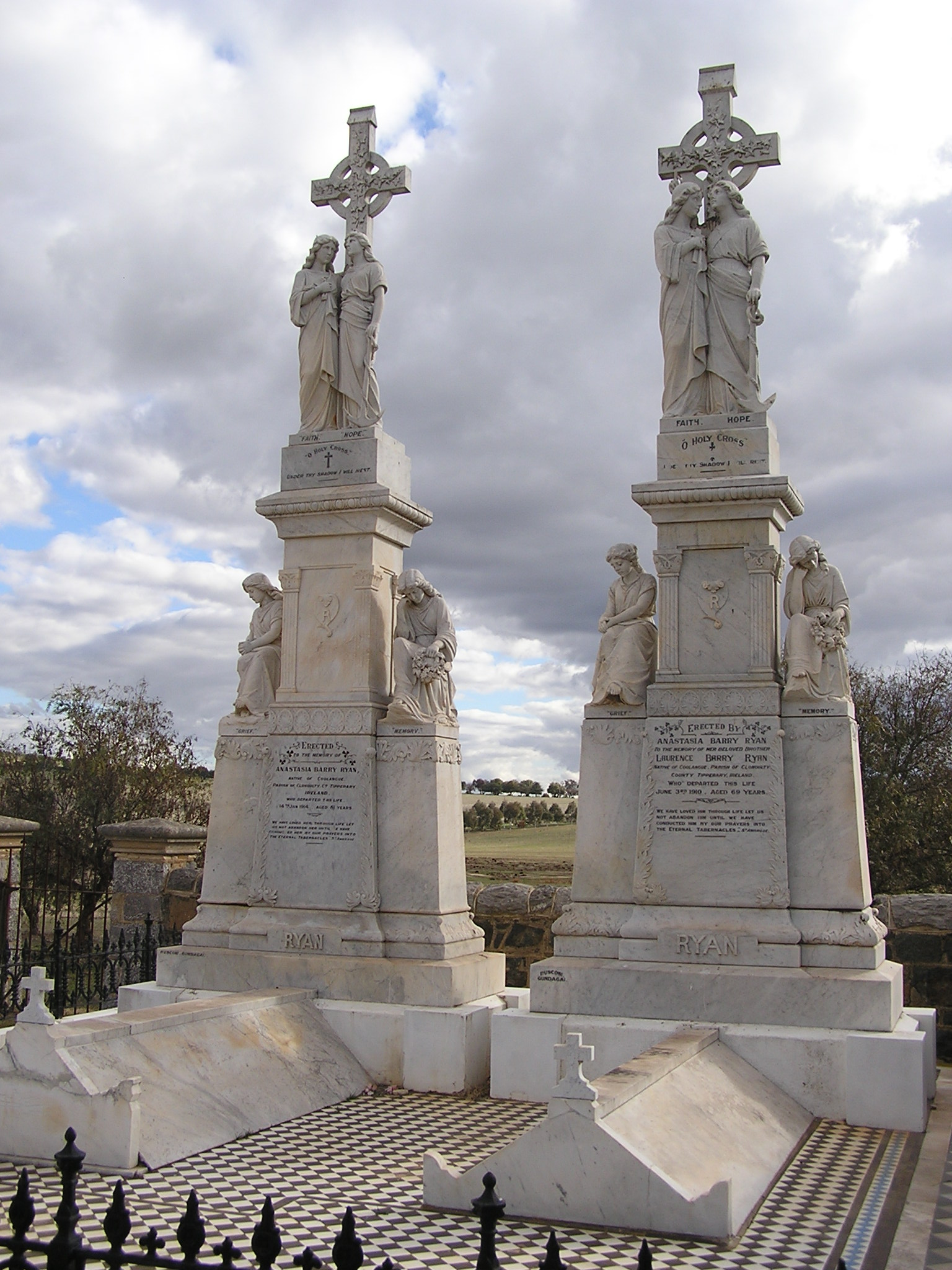
A pair of white marble monuments to the Ryan family at Galong, New South Wales

Frank Rusconi (20 August 1874 – 21 May 1964) was, together with his brother, Joseph, quarry owner and monumental mason of Gundagai, New South Wales, Australia.

He was born at Araluen near Braidwood, New South Wales, the son of a Swiss goldminer and monumental mason, Peter Rusconi and his Australian-born wife Mary (née McCarthy). Peter Rusconi was responsible for the stonework of the bridge over Majors Creek and the Anglican church in the mining village of the same name.

After his mother's death, the family returned to Switzerland while Frank was a child. At age 15, he was apprenticed first in Italy and then Switzerland in the marble trade.

Rusconi returned to New South Wales in 1901. He worked with his brother and father near Orange, New South Wales in a marble quarry they had discovered and developed.

He settled at Gundagai in 1905. He died nearly 60 years later in nearby Cootamundra having been an active member of the Gundagai community since settling there.

Notable works are:

- the Dog on the Tuckerbox – Rusconi made the base of the monument and the (full size) model of the dog, from which the bronze was cast at 'Oliver's Foundry', Sydney.
- the Marble Masterpiece, a miniature building constructed of 20,948 individual pieces of marble. Work commenced in 1910 and was completed 28 years later. The work is on display in the Gundagai tourist office.
- tombstones are at Gundagai, Orange, Cudal and Galong cemeteries; the largest and most dramatic is a pair of white marble monuments to the Ryan family at Galong,
- two war memorials at Gundagai
- the marble altar in Tumut Catholic church
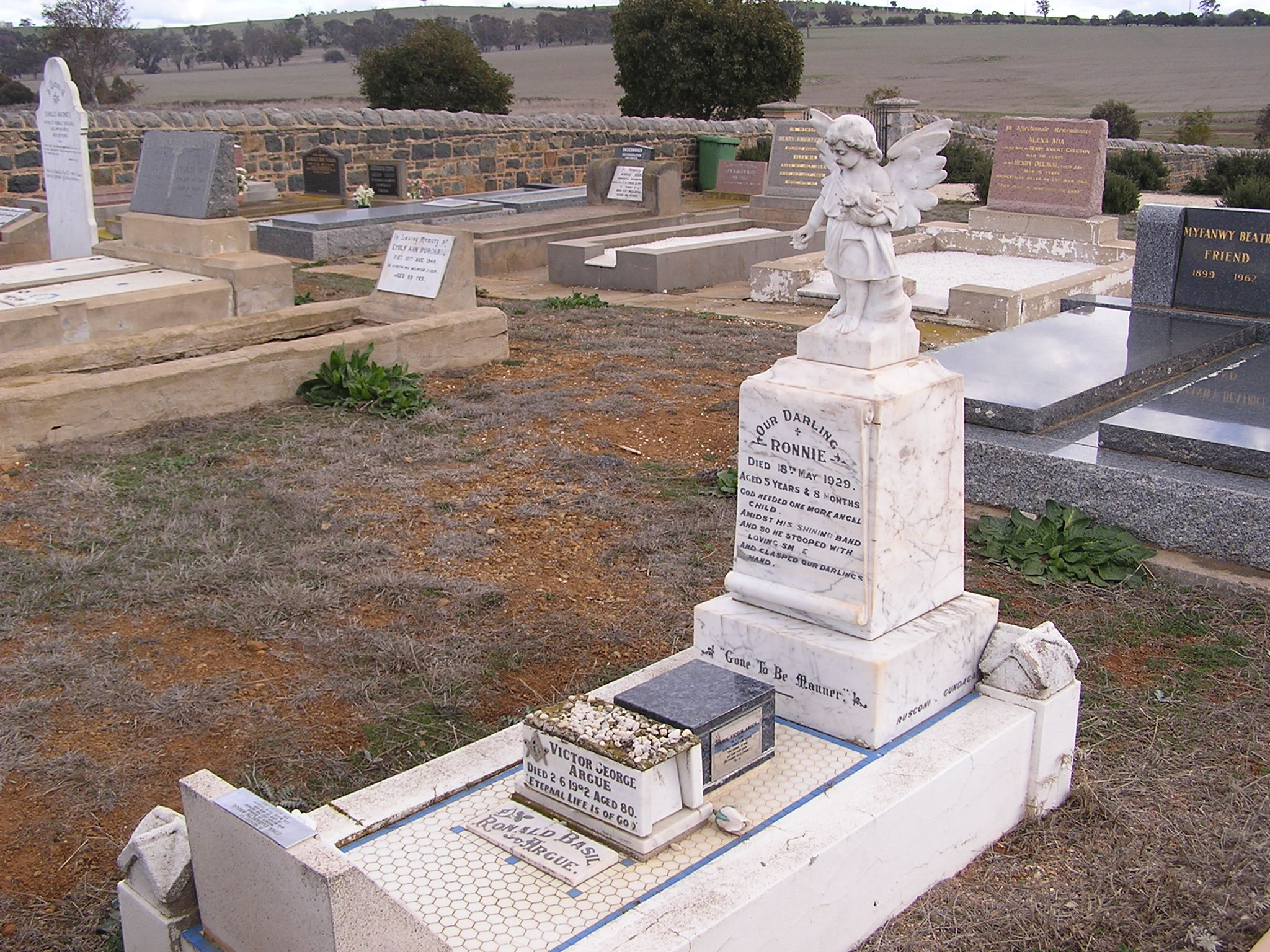
A monument for a child at Galong

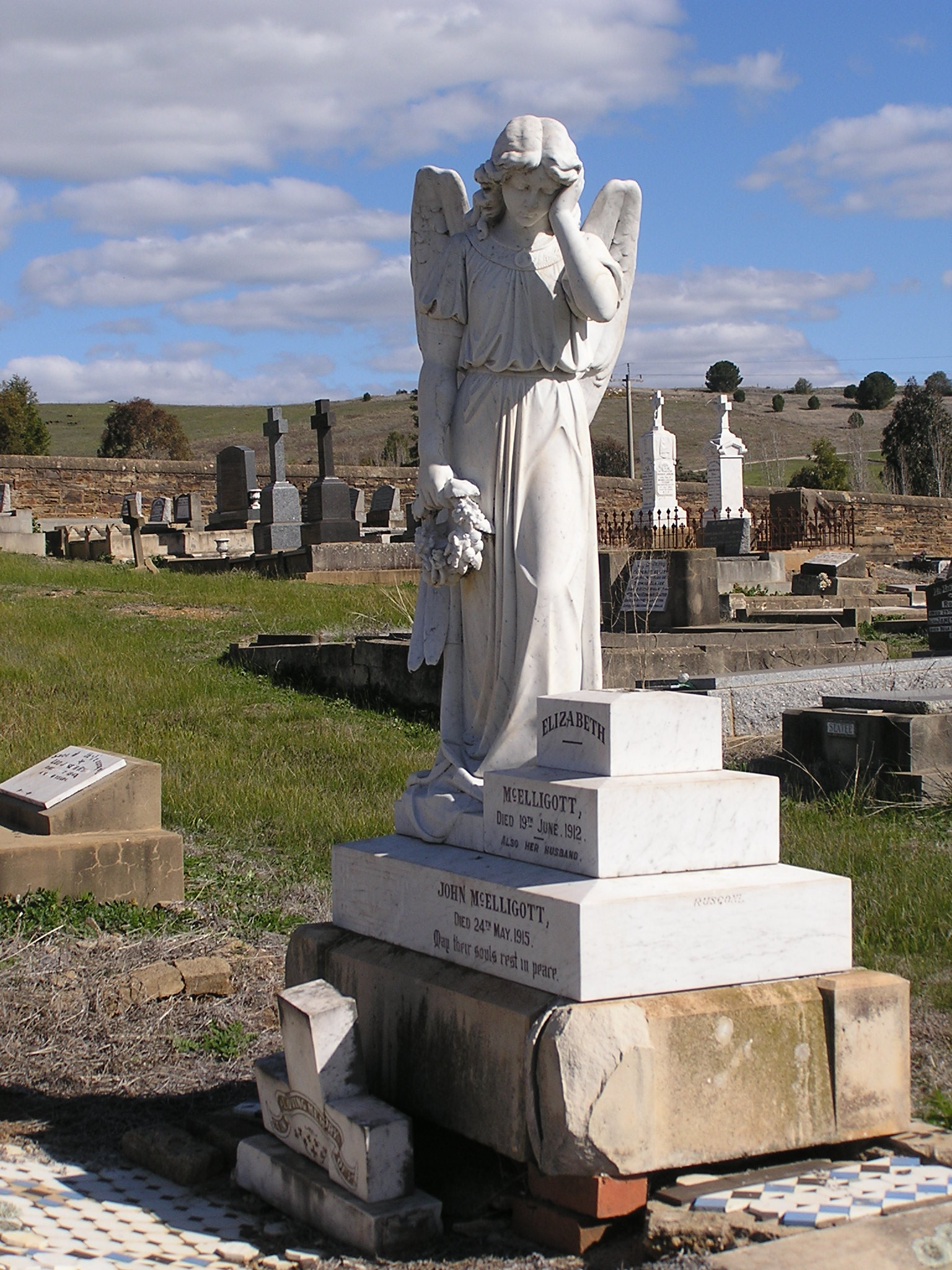
Monument at Gundagai

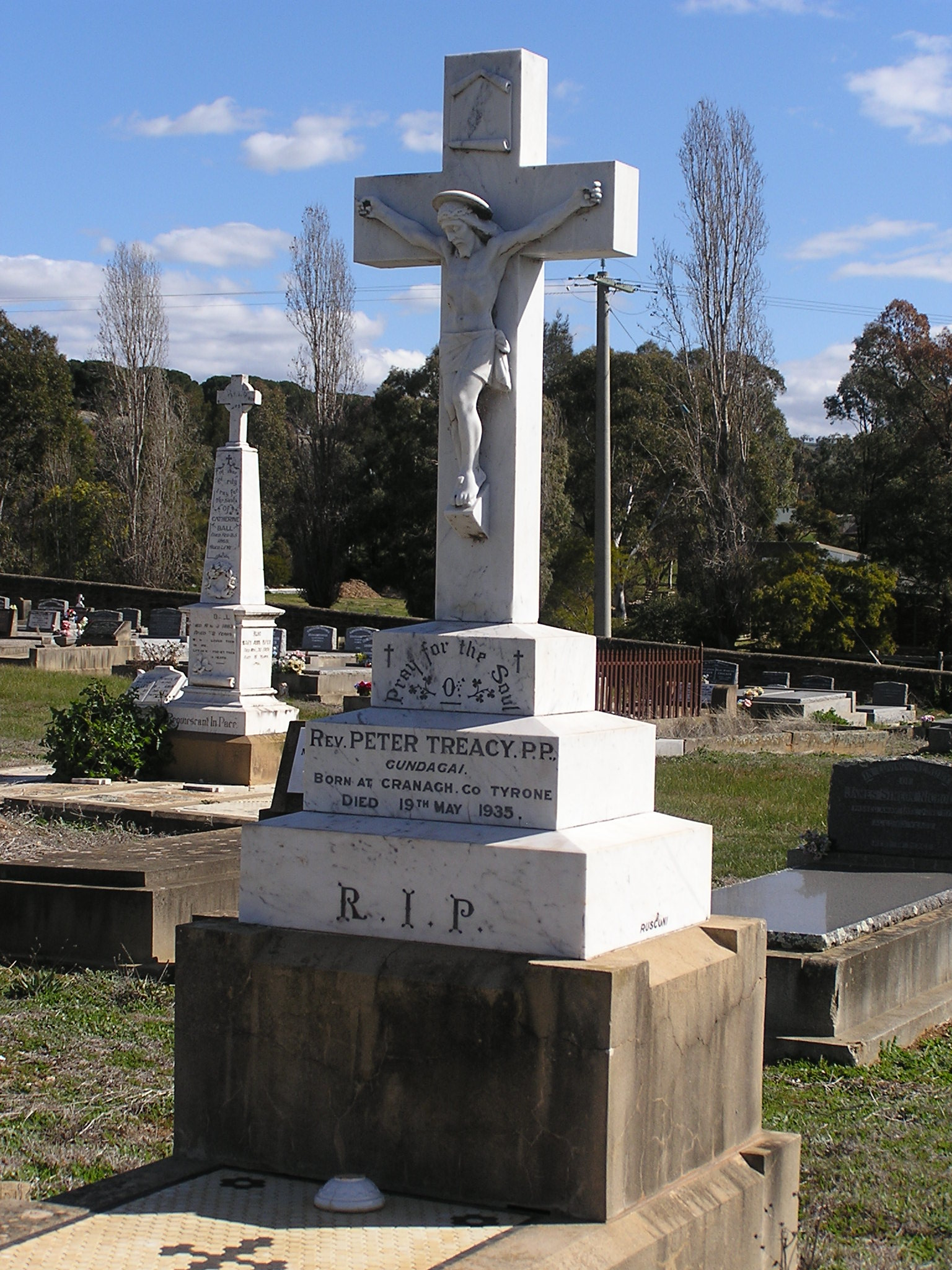
Monument at Gundagai

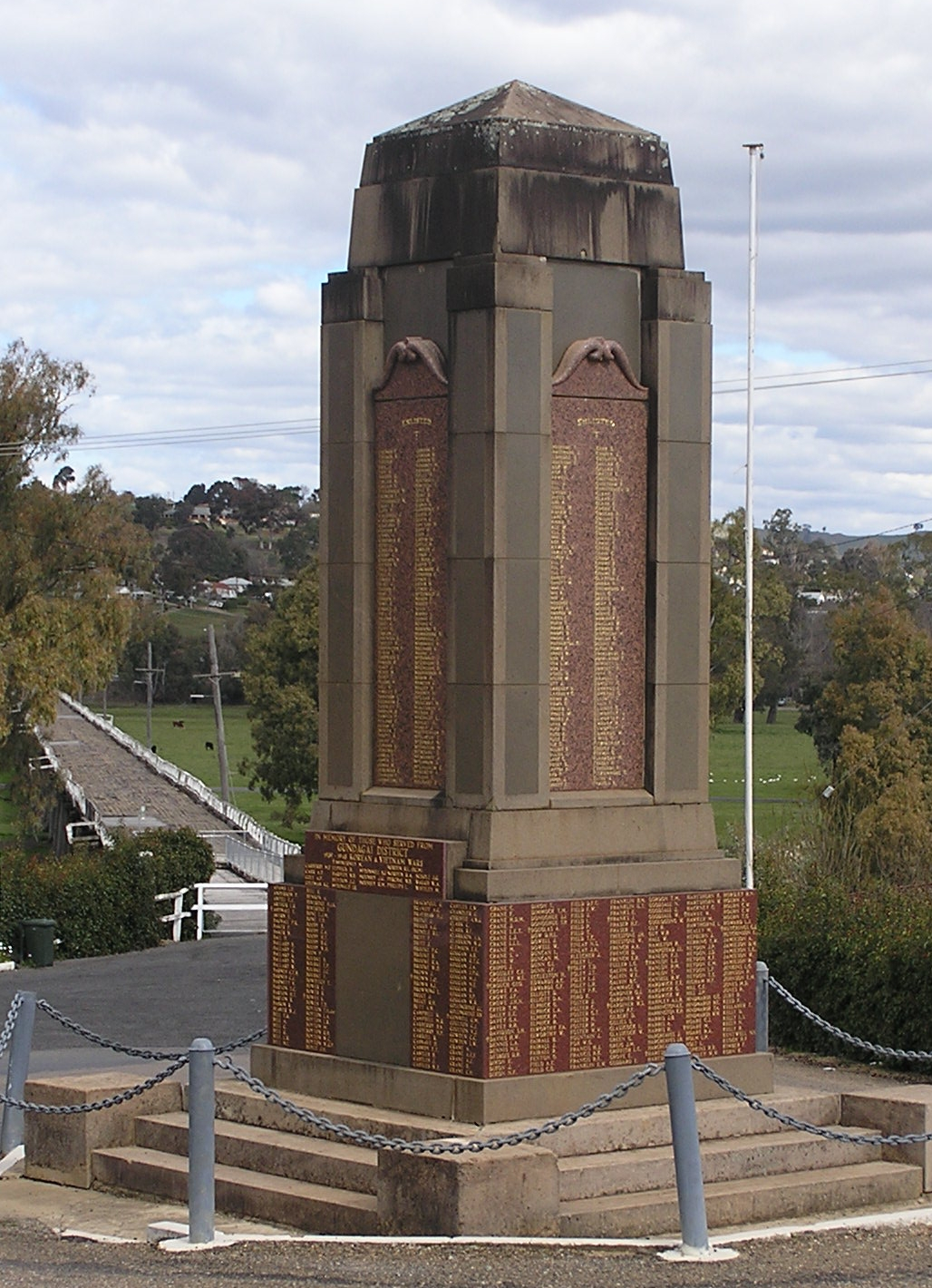
Cenotaph at Gundagai, designed and built by Rusconi

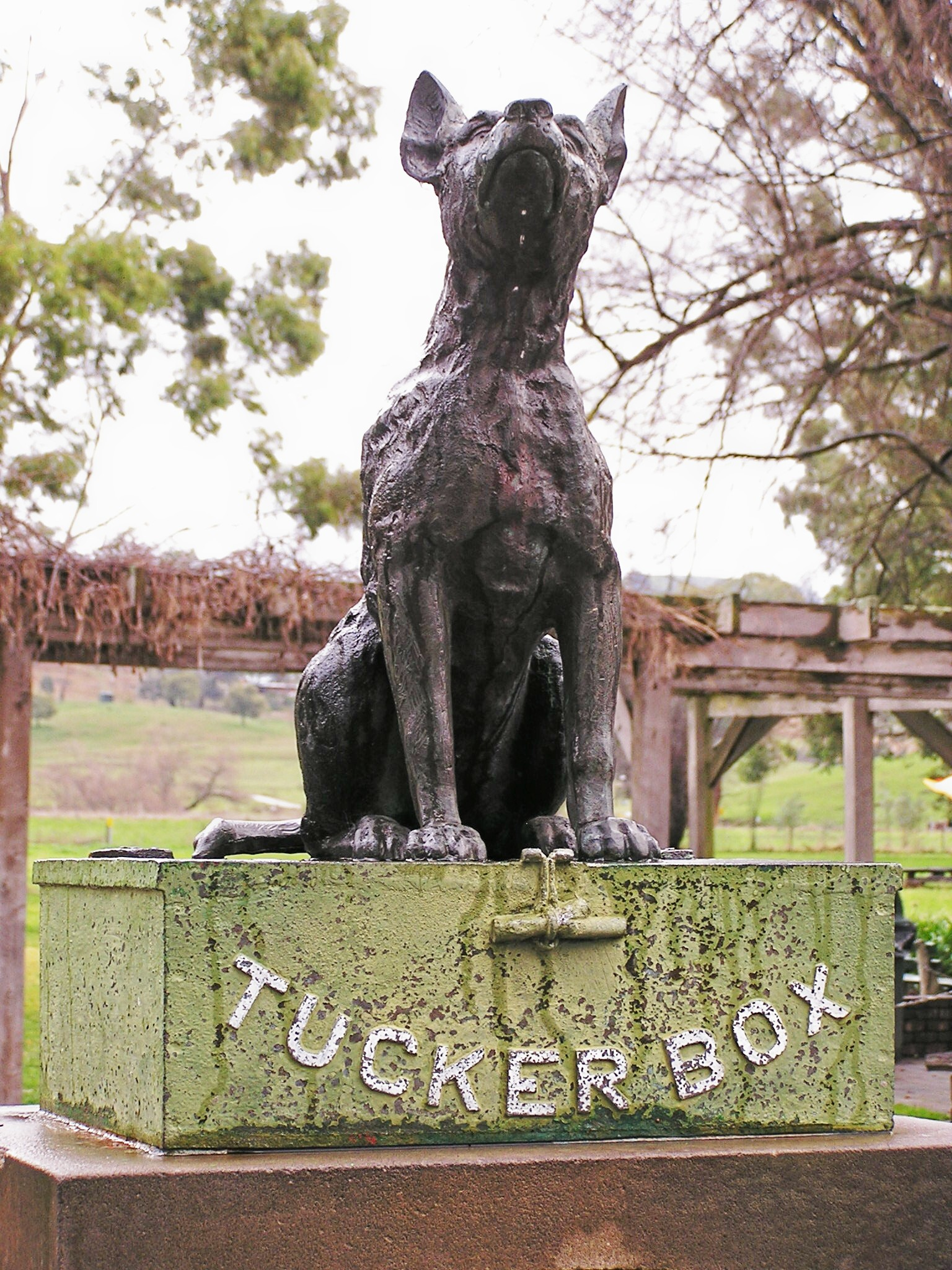
The Dog on the Tuckerbox

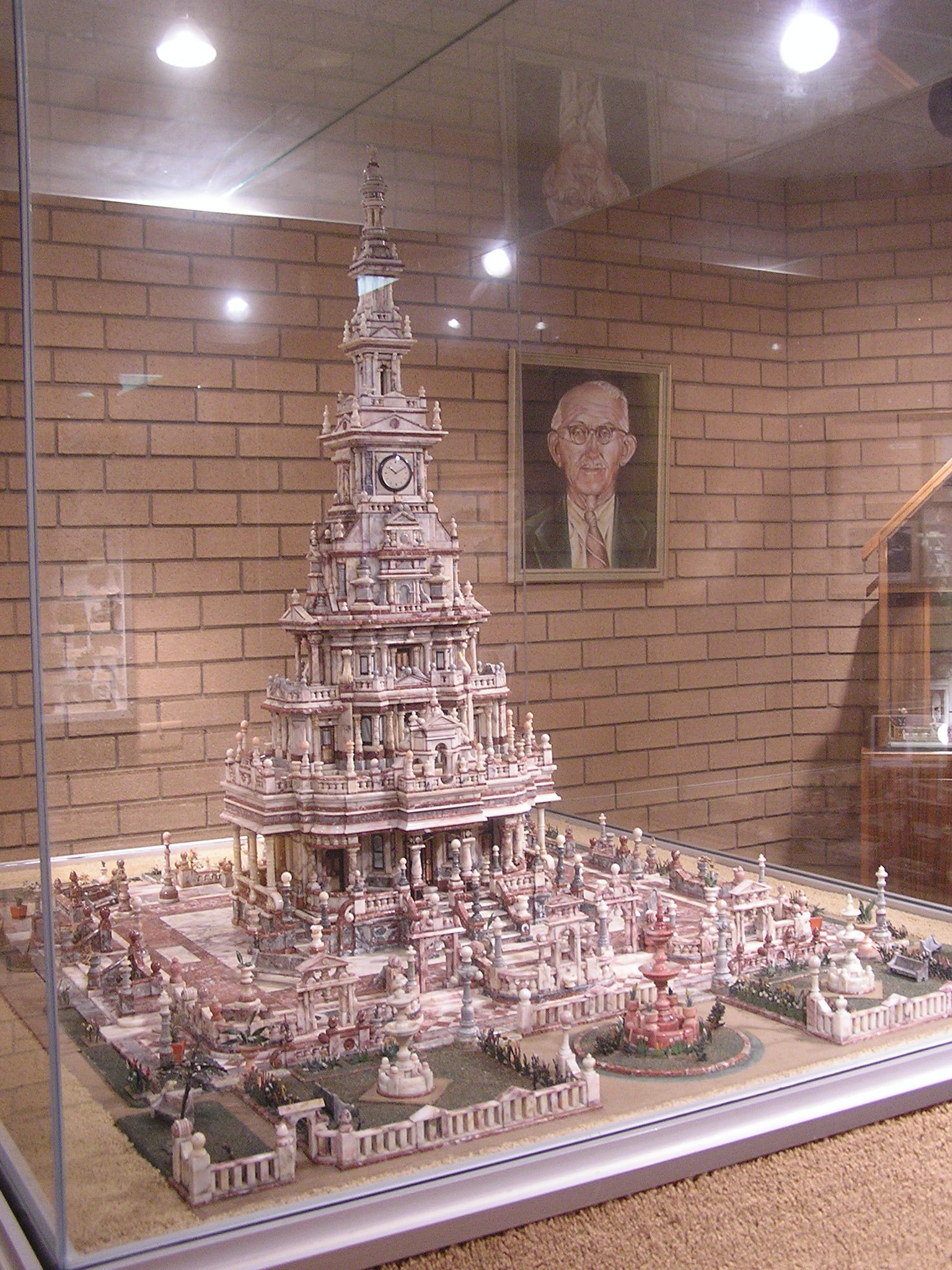
Rusconi's "Marble masterpiece"

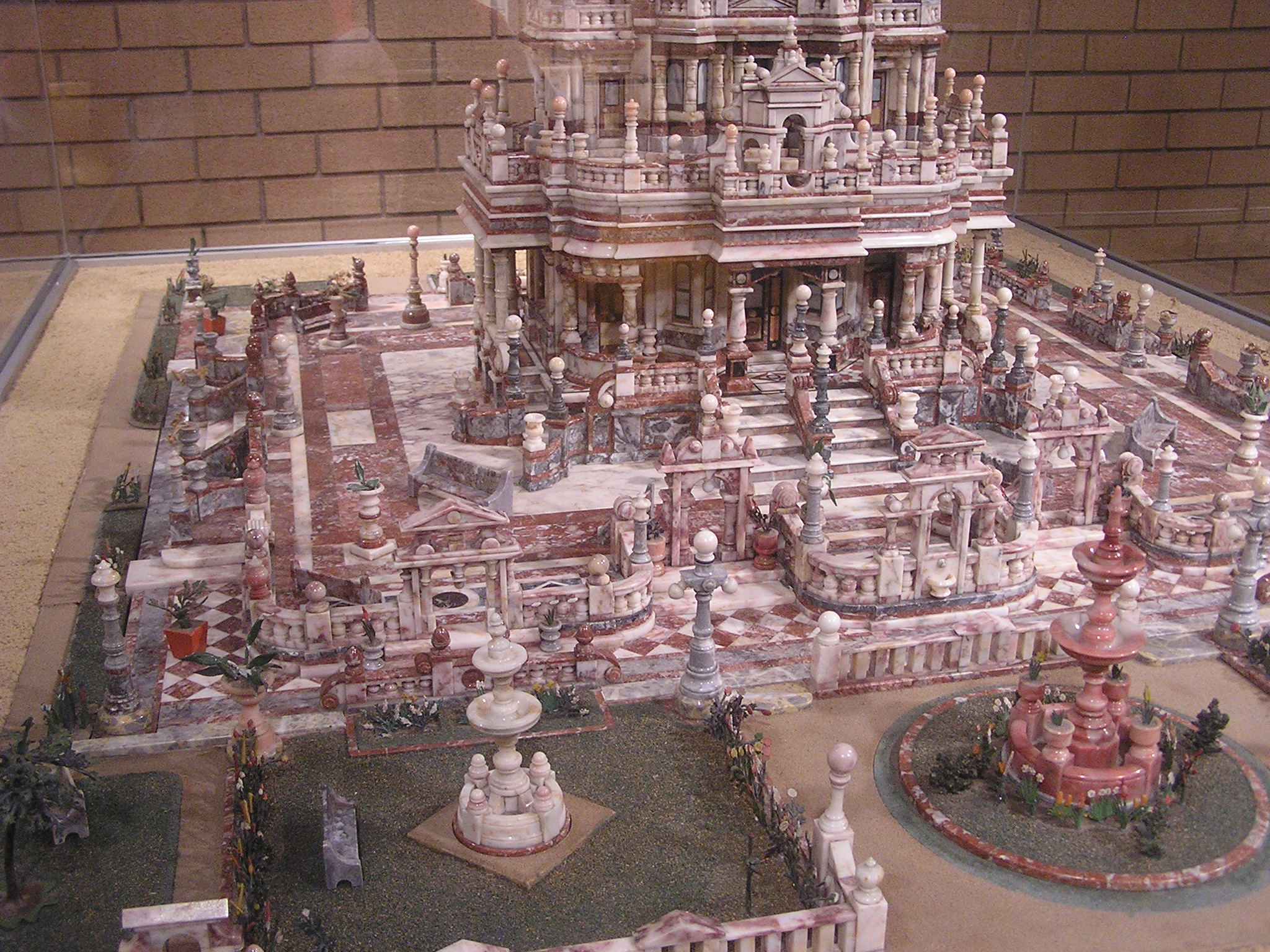
Detail of masterpiece

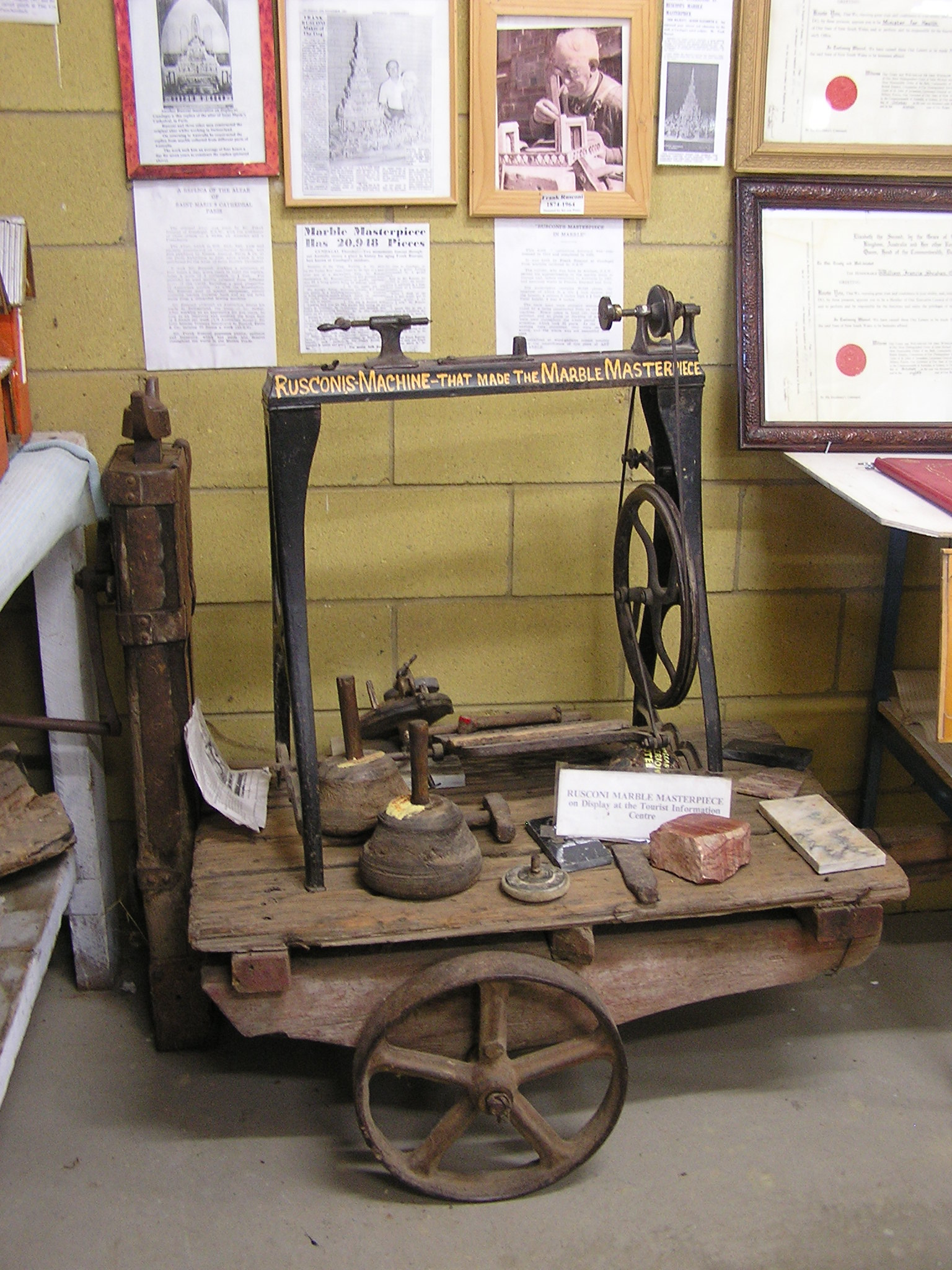
Tools used by Rusconi to carve his masterpiece, now in Gundagai Historical Museum

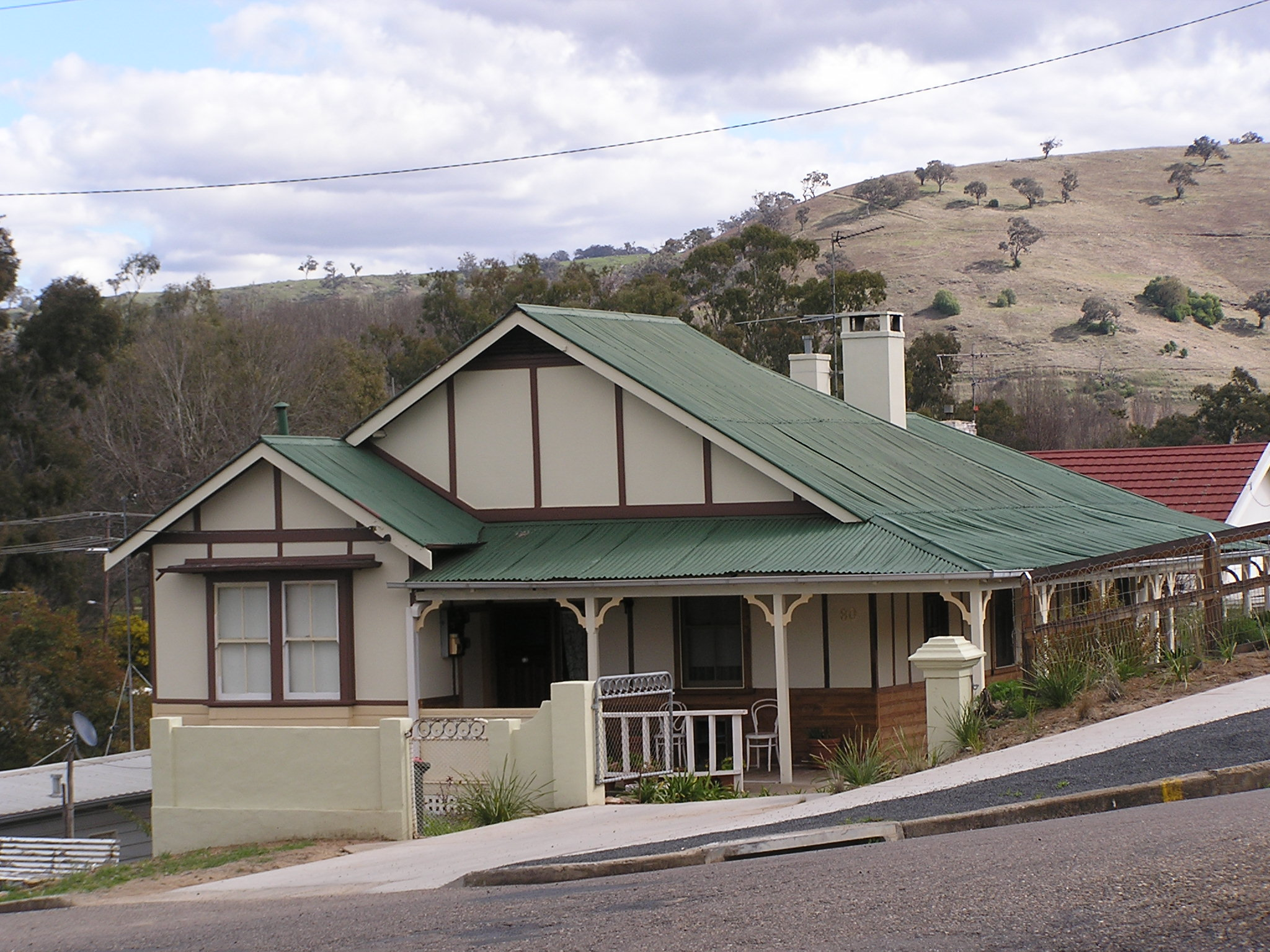
Rusconi's house in Gundagai, 'Araluen' on Sheridan Street near the cenotaph

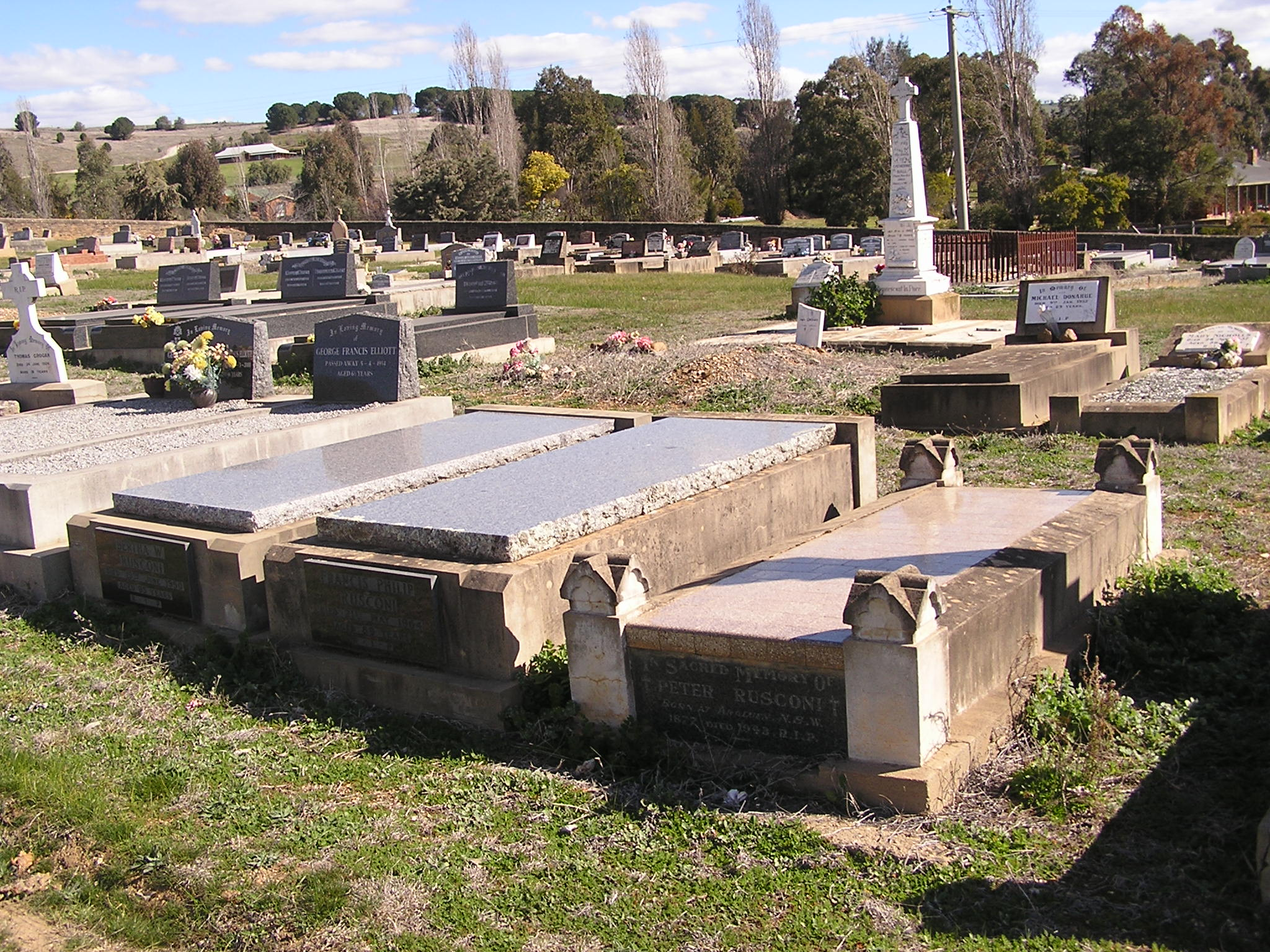
Rusconi's own grave at Gundagai cemetery
