= Galle (surname) =

Galle is a surname. Notable people with the surname include:

- Amanda Galle (born 1989), Canadian professional boxer
- Carl Galle, German athlete
- Cornelis Galle (disambiguation), multiple people
- Émile Gallé, French artist
- Johann Gottfried Galle, German astronomer
- Philip Galle, Dutch publisher
- Pierre Galle, French basketball player
