= Boorowa railway line =

Former railway line in New South Wales, Australia

Boorowa line
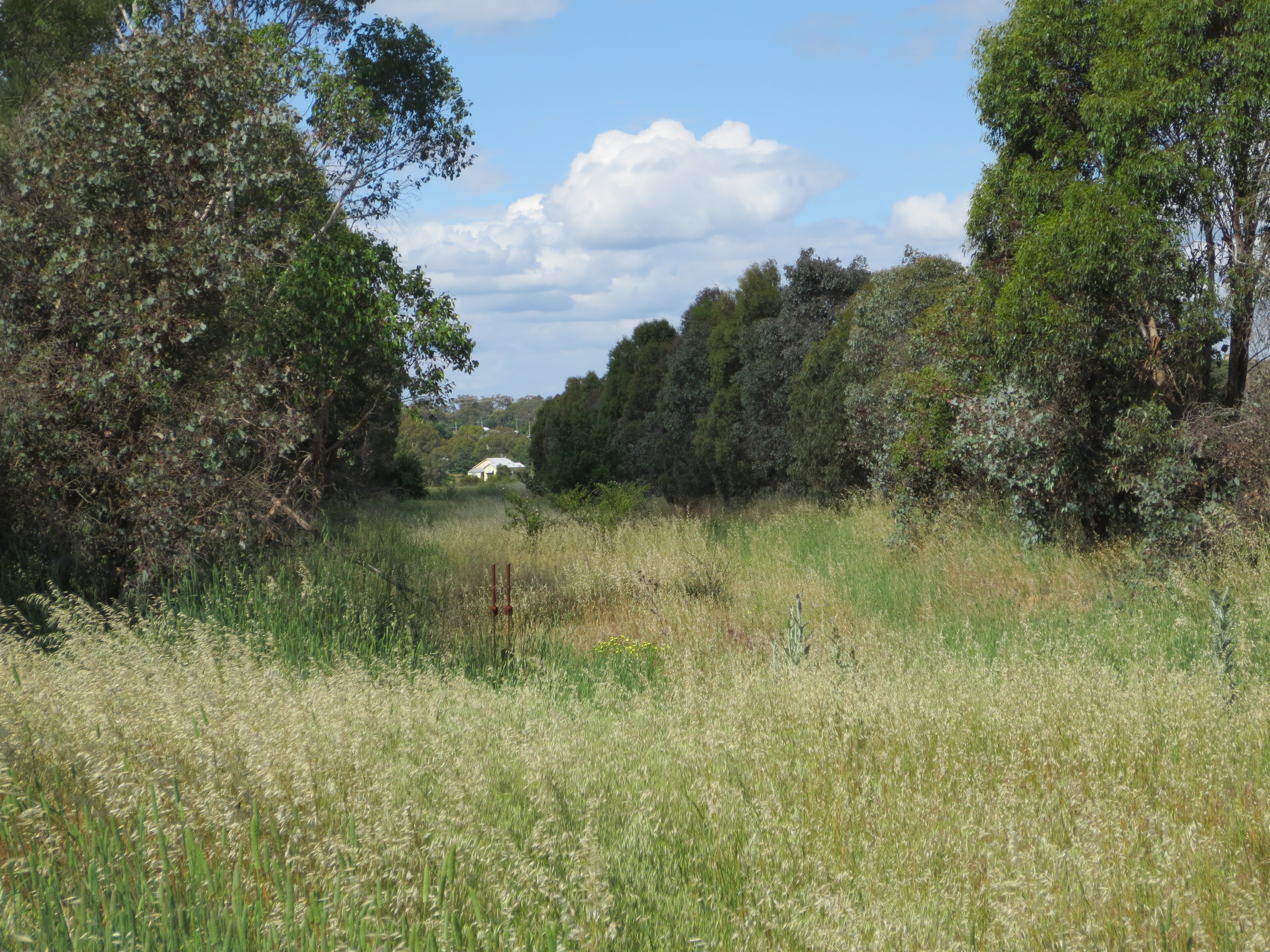
- Section of the abandoned line, now habitat for the Superb parrot

Overview
- Status: Disused
- Termini: Galong; Boorowa
- Stations: 7

Service
- Operator: State Rail Authority

History
- Opened: 10 October 1914
- Closed: December 1987

Technical
- Line length: 29 km (18 mi)
- Number of tracks: 1
- Track gauge: 1,435 mm (4 ft 8 1/2 in)

The Boorowa railway line was a branch railway line in the Hilltops Council of the South Western Slopes, located in New South Wales, Australia. The line branched off from the Main Southern railway line at Galong, running 29 km (18 mi) north to Boorowa.

== History ==
=== Construction ===
The Main Southern railway line was extended through Galong in March 1877. Residents of Burrowa, also known as Burrowye, began agitation for their own branch line. Subsequently, in February 1884 a public meeting was held in Burrowa and it was resolved to send a deputation to the Minister for Public Works to voice their feelings. By the following August, the Galong to Burrowa branch line was included in a list of branch railways under consideration. On 28 October 1884, parliament confirmed the line as part of list of lines to be constructed in the near future.

Following further inquiries, it was not until 27 February 1912, that the Galong to Burrowa Authorisation Bill came before parliament and it passed through all stages on 28 March 1912. The first sod was turned on 15 June that year, and the laying of timber sleepers commenced in August 1913. The line was built as a pioneer railway in order to lower the cost associated with construction, meaning that cheaper lower-quality materials were used, including ash ballast which was less sturdy than the gravel used on the Main Southern line.

Following two years of construction, the line was officially opened on 10 October 1914. The spelling of the town's name was altered to Boorowa on this date, to match that of the station. The opening ceremony was described by the Sydney Morning Herald:

Perfect weather and a record gathering attended the official opening of the Burrowa railway on Saturday. The Chief Secretary, Mr. Cann, severed the ribbon. He said that the line, which was estimated at £81,000, had cost £114,000, the excess being due to the radical alteration in the cost of labour and materials since the making of the estimate some years ago.

=== Services ===
Passenger services did not run along the line until the early morning of 2 February 1915. Services originated from Harden on the Main Southern line and reversed at Galong to continue to Boorowa.

Three scheduled services ran weekly, on Tuesdays, Thursdays and Saturdays. As demand was not high enough to justify running a purely passenger service, all trains were mixed passenger and freight. An additional railmotor service was introduced in 1929, which ran on Mondays, Wednesdays and Fridays. Railbuses were briefly run on Wednesdays and Thursdays, from 1937 to 1942.

The railmotor services were discontinued by 1949, leaving the thrice weekly mixed train as the sole service once again. Steam services were replaced by diesel in October 1967.

Goods services mostly transported wool and wheat, the main industries within Boorowa, though superphosphate, cattle, sheep, dairy products and timber were also exported from the region.

=== Closure ===
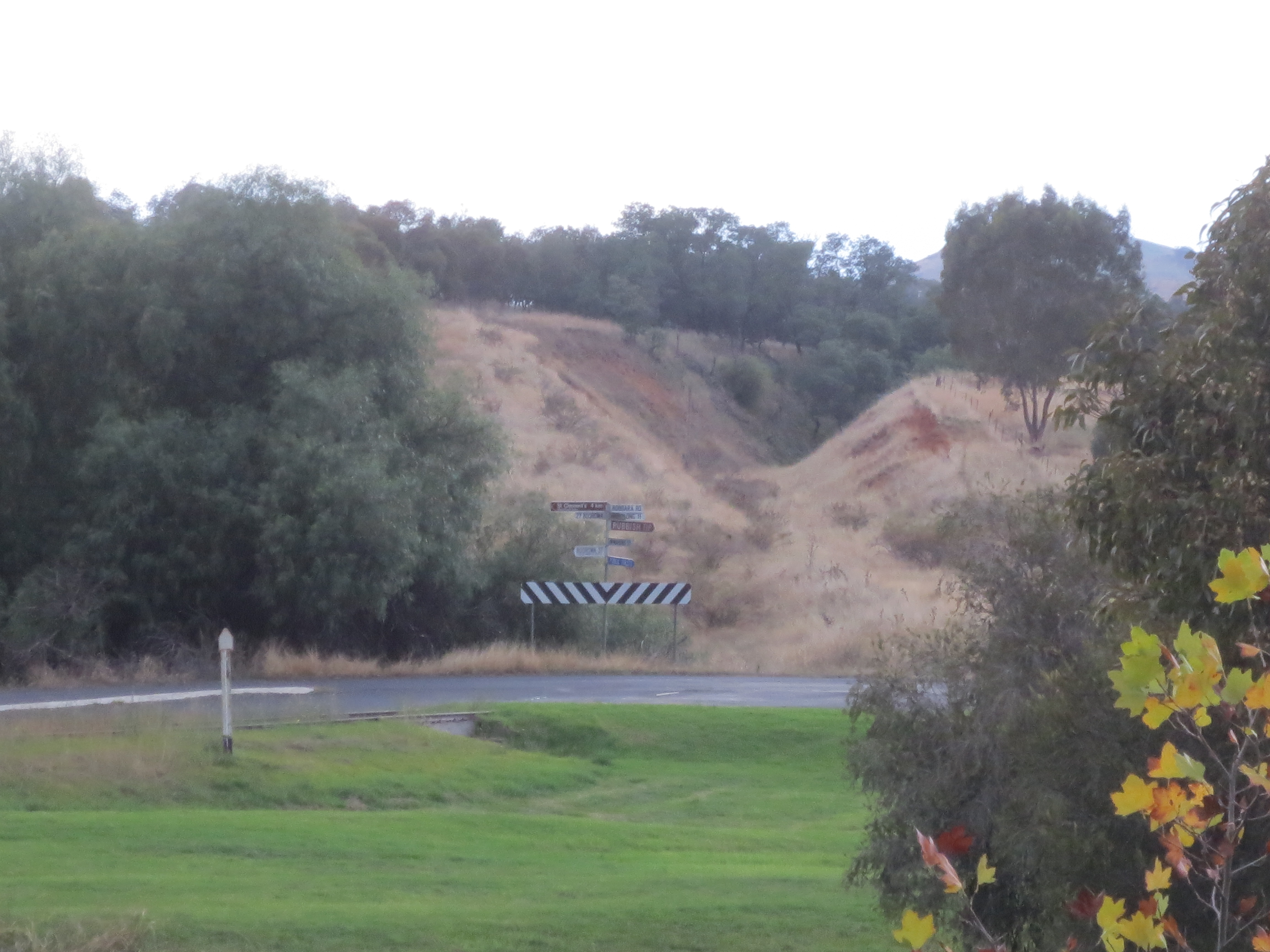
Boorowa railway line cutting at Galong, New South Wales (2015)

Passenger services were withdrawn on 11 August 1974, though the last recorded passenger train along the line was a tour organised by the Australian Railway Historical Society in early 1987. The final goods train to use the line ran on 23 October 1987. The line was officially suspended in December 1987.

A rail trail has been proposed to reuse the disused line. with a community consultation launched in November 2025.

== Rolling stock ==
Z24, Z25, C30T and C32 class steam locomotives hauled trains on the line. CPH railmotors were used for the supplementary railmotor services introduced in 1929, and FP paybuses were used for the brief railbus services.

Upon the replacement of steam locomotives with diesel locomotives, services were hauled by 48 class locomotives.
