= Gallos =

Gallos may refer to:

== People ==
- Geza Gallos (1948–2013), Austrian footballer
- Hermann Gallos (1886–1957), Austrian operatic tenor and academic teacher

== Sculpture ==
- Gallos (sculpture) by Rubin Eynon, at Tintagel Castle, Cornwall

== Sports ==
- Gallos Blancos de Hermosillo, former soccer team in Hermosillo, Sonora, Mexico
- Gallos de Caliente commonly known as Tijuana, or simply as Xolos, Mexican professional football club in Tijuana
- Gallos de Sancti Spíritus, baseball team in the Cuban National Series
- Gallos Hidrocálidos de Aguascalientes, former football club from Aguascalientes, Mexico

== See also ==
- Gallo (disambiguation)
