= Gally =

Gally is a surname. Notable people with the surname include:

== People ==
- Djovi Gally (1955–2023), Togolese lawyer and politician
- Francis Gally (Francis Jean Mazières, 1863–1918) French actor
- Henry Gally (1696–1769), English divine and classical scholar
- John Gally Knight (John Gally, c. 1741 – 1804), English barrister and MP

== Fictional characters ==
- Gally, or Alita, in Battle Angel Alita
- Gally, in The Maze Runner novel series

== See also ==
- Galley (disambiguation)
- Galle (disambiguation)
- Galli (disambiguation)
- Gal (disambiguation)
