= Boorowa =

- Suburb
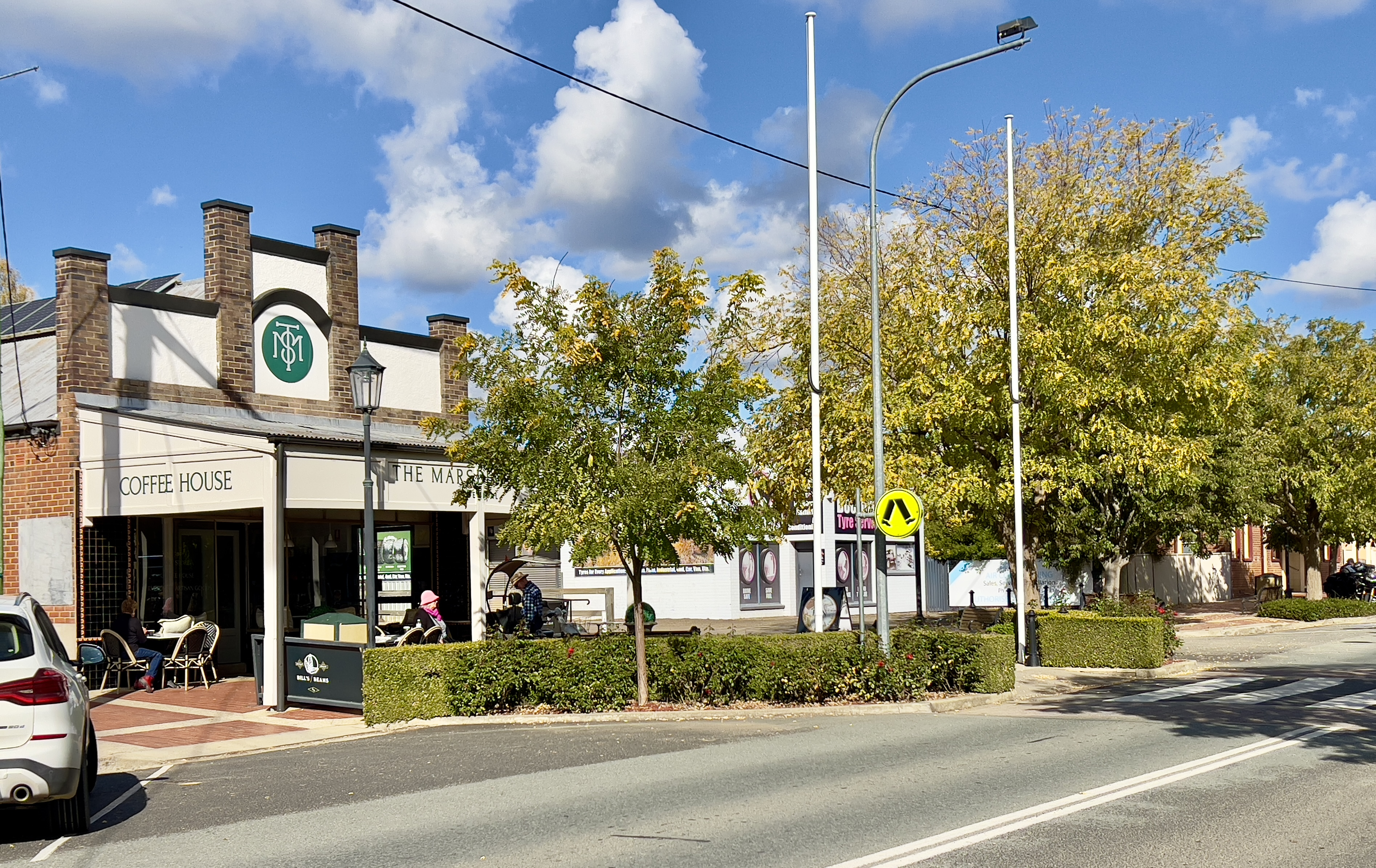
- Marsden Street

- Coordinates: 34°26′S 148°43′E
- Country: Australia
- State: New South Wales
- LGA: Hilltops Council
- Location: 40 km (25 mi) E of Young; 70 km (43 mi) ENE of Cootamundra; 78 km (48 mi) S of Cowra; 240 km (150 mi) W of Sydney
- Established: 1843

Government
  - State electorate: Goulburn
  - Federal division: Riverina
- Elevation: 490 m (1,610 ft)

Population
  - Total: 1,888 (SAL 2021)
- Postcode: 2586
- Mean max temp: 20.7 °C (69.3 °F)
- Mean min temp: 6.2 °C (43.2 °F)
- Annual rainfall: 608.8 mm (23.97 in)

Boorowa (/buːroʊwə/) is a farming village in the Hilltops Region in the South West Slopes of New South Wales, Australia.

It is located in a valley 340 kilometres (210 mi) southwest of Sydney around 490 metres (1,610 ft) above sea-level. The town is in Hilltops Council local government area.

== History ==
Before the arrival of Europeans, the area was part of the lands occupied by the Wiradjuri Nation with the Gandangara Aboriginal Australians. It is believed that the name 'Burrowa', the original spelling, derives from the local Aboriginal language and refers to a native bird, the plains turkey Australian bustard.

The first European to travel through what is now Boorowa Shire was surveyor George Evans in 1815. Unofficial occupation of the district began in 1821 with Irishmen Rodger Corcoran and Ned Ryan, both former convicts who had received their 'ticket of leave' from the Governor. The first land grant in the general area was issued to Thomas Icely in 1829. A mill was operating on the future town site of Boorowa by 1837, along with an inn and several houses.

Governor Gipps proposed the creation of a village named 'Burrowa' in 1842, to be located 9 km north-east of the present site at Kings Plains which had been surveyed in 1828. However, that spot proved unsuitable and the village was established on its present site in 1843. The early years in the district saw lawlessness and mayhem as a result of long running boundary disputes, theft of livestock and arson, even murders; the cause being remoteness and lack of law and order. Bushrangers roamed the surrounding unsettled wild mountainous land, making raids into the town and stations of the district.

Squatters took up large tracts of land in the Boorowa area but the introduction of the Robertson Land Acts in 1861 resulted in a new land grab where large numbers of settlers, particularly 'ticket of leave' men, applied for a 'selection' of land with low cost land parcels available.

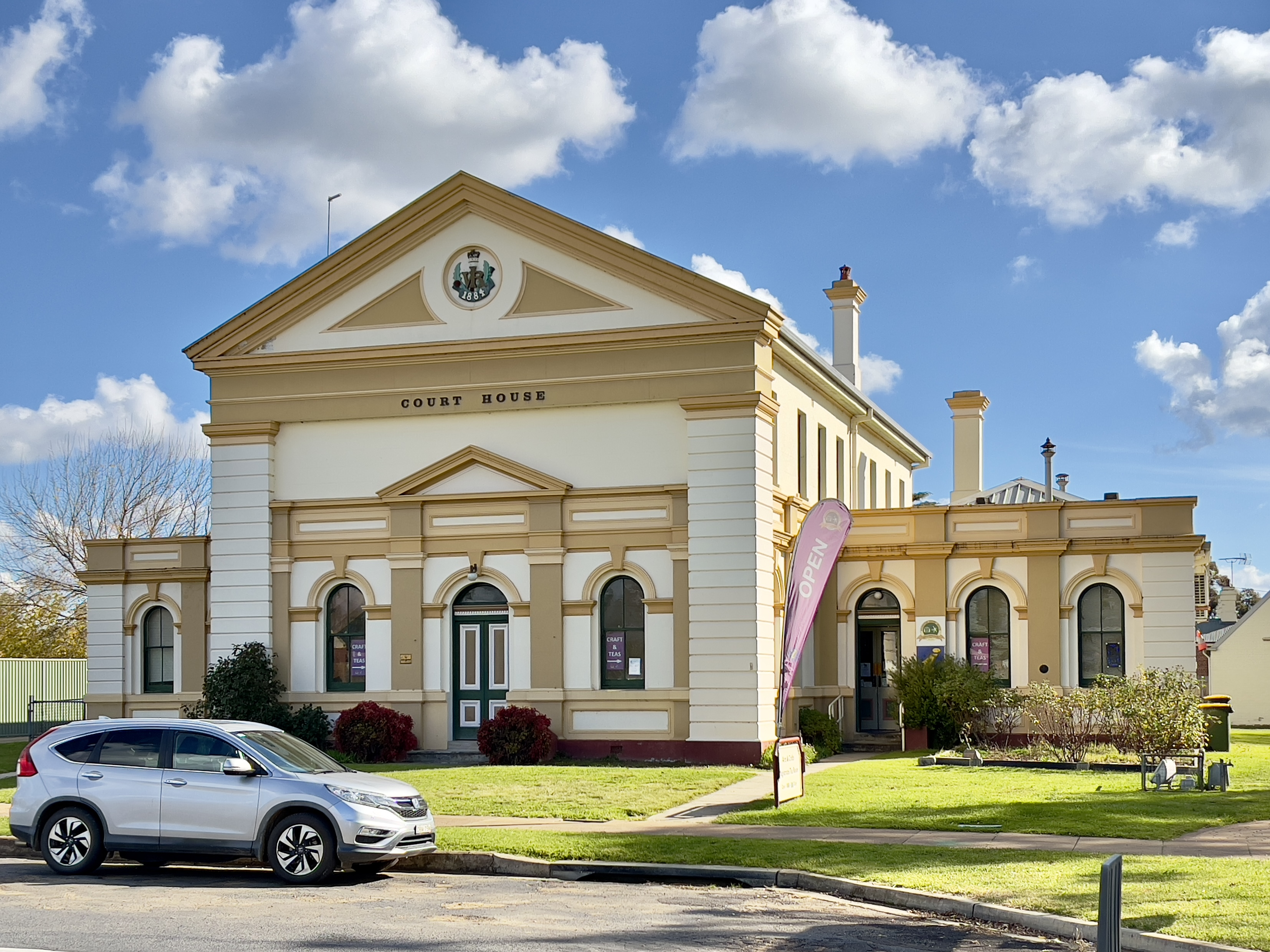
Boorowa Court House

The district surrounding the town was administered by the Murringal Shire. The town and shire were amalgamated to form the Boorowa Shire in 1944.

The district was given over to farming, although it received a push along when gold was found at Carcoar, Browns Creek and Kings Plains. Gold mines were established although copper and iron were also extracted. Samuel Marsden's copper mine operated until 1900.

The town's rugby league team competed for the Maher Cup during the 20th century.

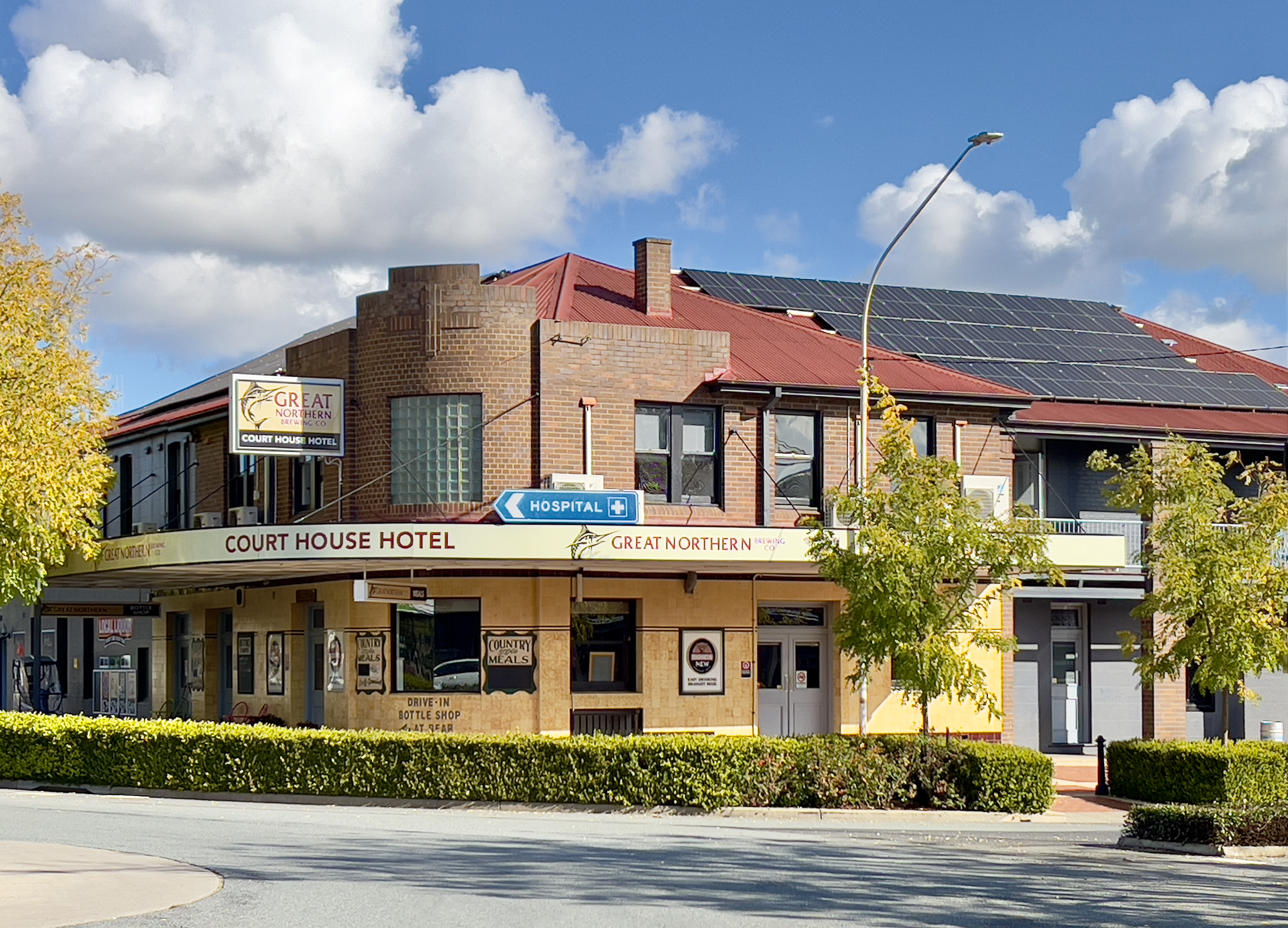
Court House Hotel

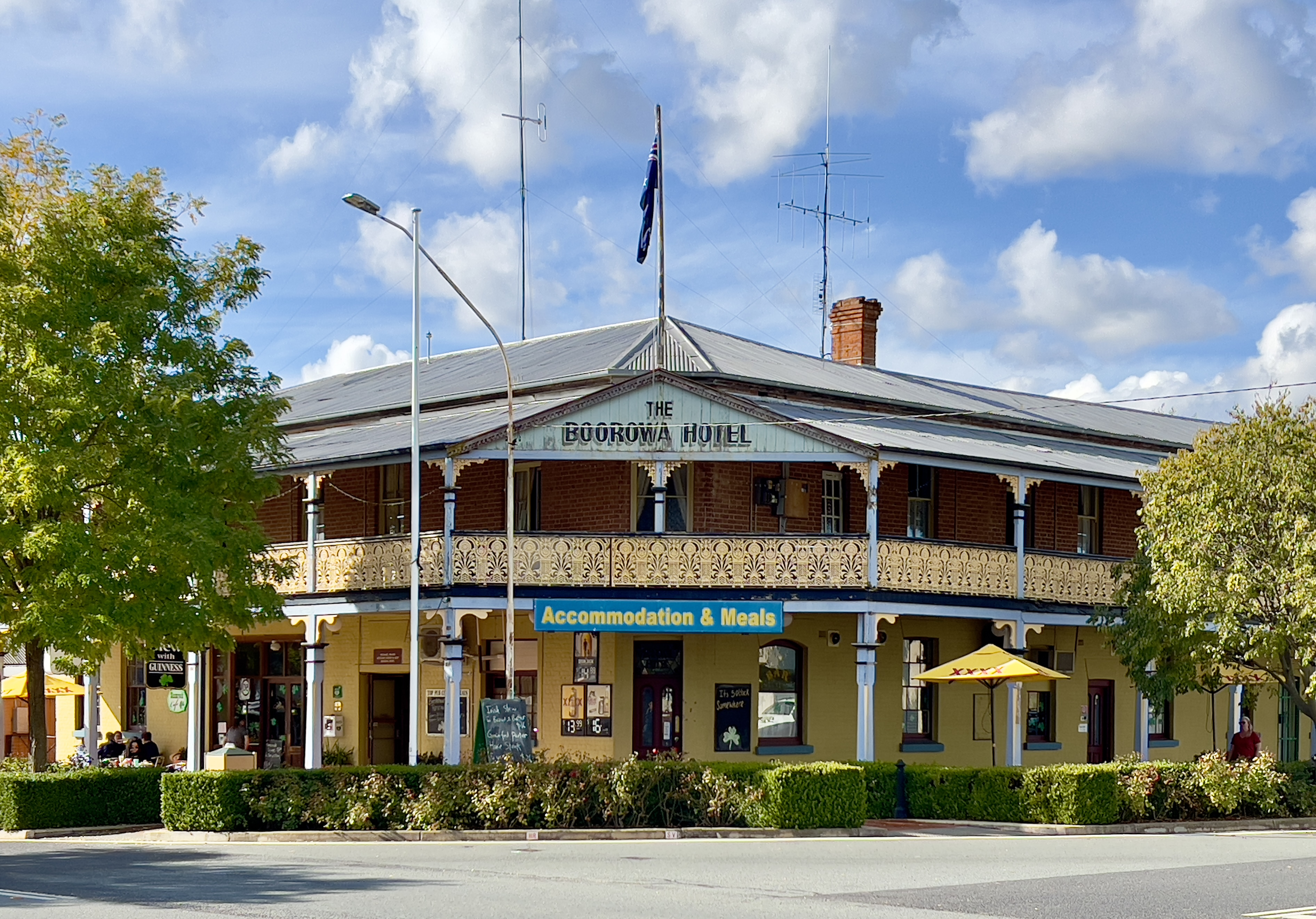
Boorowa Hotel

At the 2021 census, Boorowa had a population of 1,888, having grown from 1,641 at the 2016 census and 1,211 at the 2011 census.

=== Railway ===
Boorowa residents and the local member of parliament lobbied the Government to direct the new southern main line progressing towards Goulburn to pass through the town. However the towns of Yass and Murrumburrah won the debate. The next best option was a branch line to the town and this lobbying lasted 40 years before the line was eventually constructed, opening for traffic on 10 October 1914.

The arrival of the railway spurred development. Burrowa's name was then changed to "Boorowa". Boorowa replaced Carcoar as the major service centre to local farmlands. It became a municipality in 1888. By the turn of the century a butter factory and freezing works were major employers in the town. Passenger trains ceased in 1980 and the Boorowa railway line from Galong to Boorowa closed in 1987.

The post office was ordered to discontinue use of the name "Burrowa" in 1914, but the two spellings were used interchangeably throughout the area for many years and the town's newspaper stubbornly retained the old spelling on its masthead until January 1951.

=== Infrastructure ===
The main infrastructure achievements over the 180 years that connected Boorowa to the rest of the Colony included the first Post Office and mail service in 1835, the electric telegraph in 1866, voice telephone in 1906, electric street lighting in the 1920s by the towns own generator, later the town and consumers were connected to the Burrinjuck Hydro electricity system in 1938.

== Environment ==
The town is located on the Boorowa River, a tributary of the Lachlan River. The Murrumbidgee River drains the southern portion of the Boorowa district. The soil in the area is rich volcanic soil washed down over millennia from an extinct volcano known as Mount Canemumbola.

=== Climate ===
Boorowa experiences an oceanic climate (Köppen: Cfb), with warm to hot summers and cool to cold winters. Snow can fall on the rare occasion, with the last significant snowfall in August 2019.

Climate data for Boorowa Post Office (1947–1969, rainfall 1882–2019); 488 m AMSL; 34.44° S, 148.72° E
| Month | Jan | Feb | Mar | Apr | May | Jun | Jul | Aug | Sep | Oct | Nov | Dec | Year |
|---|---|---|---|---|---|---|---|---|---|---|---|---|---|
| Mean daily maximum °C (°F) | 29.5 (85.1) | 28.9 (84.0) | 26.6 (79.9) | 21.1 (70.0) | 15.9 (60.6) | 12.7 (54.9) | 11.9 (53.4) | 13.3 (55.9) | 17.4 (63.3) | 20.1 (68.2) | 23.0 (73.4) | 27.4 (81.3) | 20.7 (69.2) |
| Mean daily minimum °C (°F) | 12.7 (54.9) | 13.0 (55.4) | 10.3 (50.5) | 5.7 (42.3) | 2.9 (37.2) | 1.6 (34.9) | 0.0 (32.0) | 1.0 (33.8) | 3.0 (37.4) | 6.1 (43.0) | 7.4 (45.3) | 10.8 (51.4) | 6.2 (43.2) |
| Average rainfall mm (inches) | 50.7 (2.00) | 42.8 (1.69) | 47.7 (1.88) | 46.7 (1.84) | 46.7 (1.84) | 55.4 (2.18) | 52.7 (2.07) | 55.1 (2.17) | 50.6 (1.99) | 56.9 (2.24) | 50.5 (1.99) | 53.0 (2.09) | 608.8 (23.98) |
| Average rainy days (≥ 0.2 mm) | 5.2 | 4.8 | 5.1 | 5.4 | 7.2 | 9.1 | 10.4 | 10.0 | 8.2 | 7.9 | 6.6 | 5.6 | 85.5 |
Source: Australian Bureau of Meteorology

== Notable people ==
- Jelisa Apps (born 1990) – journalist and television presenter
- Frederick Ashton (1866−1941) – circus proprietor
- Eric Bryce AM (1932−2007) – music teacher and composer
- Dorothy Cumming (1894–1983) – silent film actress
- Marguerite Ludovia Dale (1883−1963) – feminist and playwright
- Richard Dowden, space physicist
- Thomas Jenkins (born 2001) – Professional Rugby League Player
- Francis McGrath (1866–1947) – jockey and racehorse-trainer
- James Morrison AM (born 1962) – jazz musician
- John Quinn (1862−1937) – sheepdog expert and veterinary surgeon
- Karen Webb APM – Commissioner of the New South Wales Police Force
- John Willcock (1879−1956) – engine driver and 15th Premier of Western Australia

== Events ==
- Boorowa's agricultural show is held in March.
- Picnic Race Meeting held in May
- October long weekend – The "Running of the Sheep" down the main street of Boorowa during the Irish Woolfest.

== Gallery ==
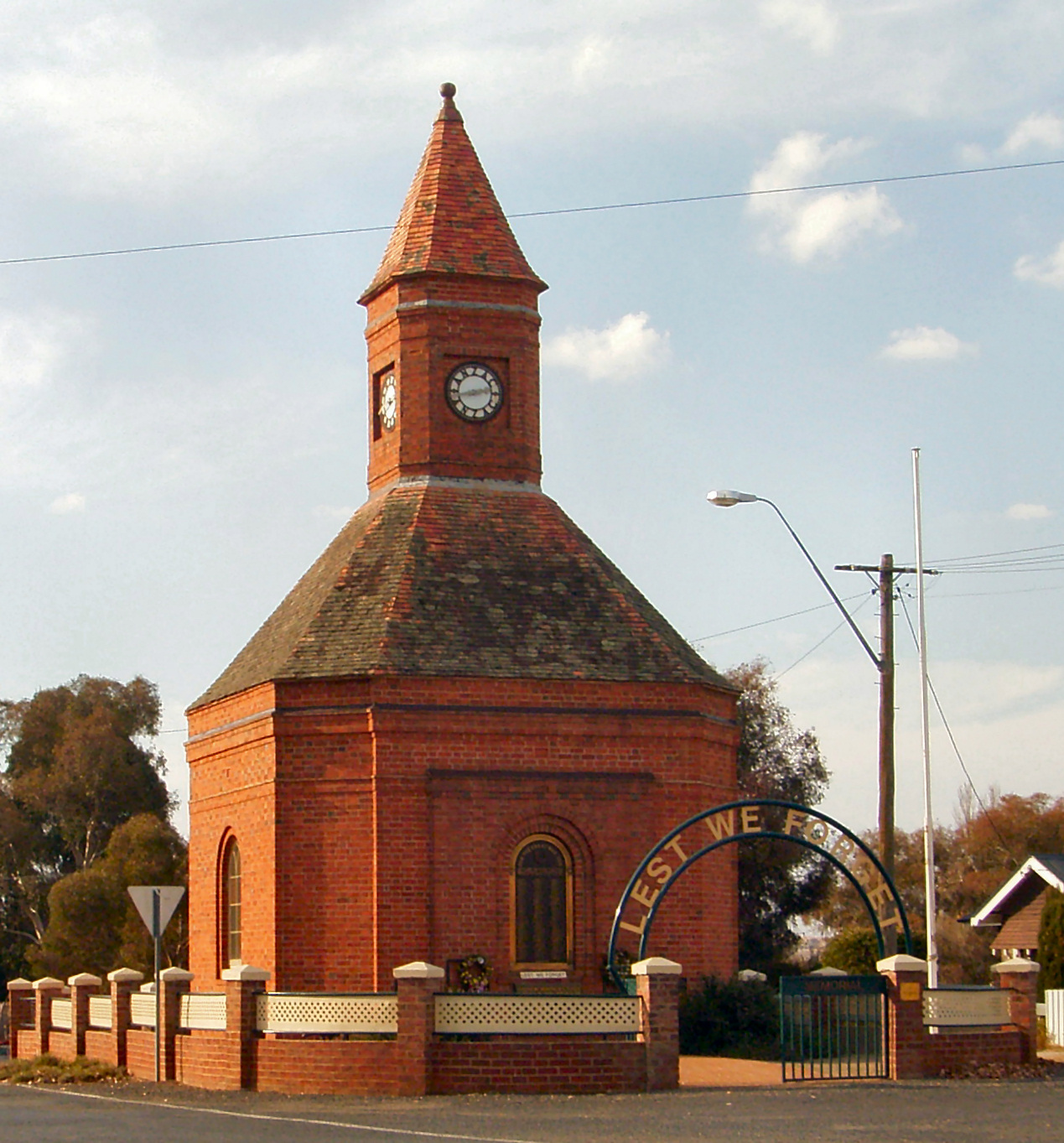
Anzac War Memorial, Marsden Street Boorowa, constructed in 1933

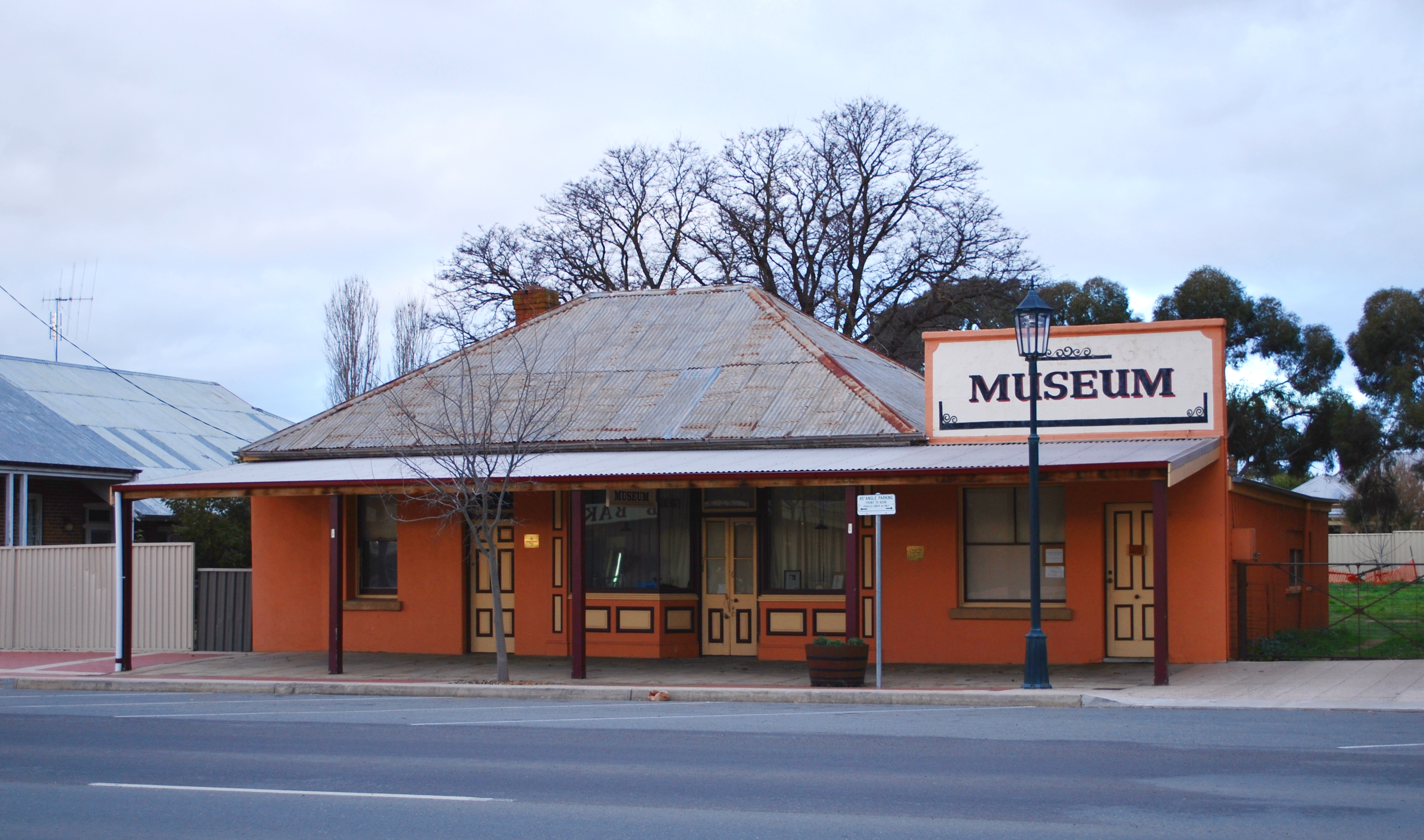
Boorowa Museum

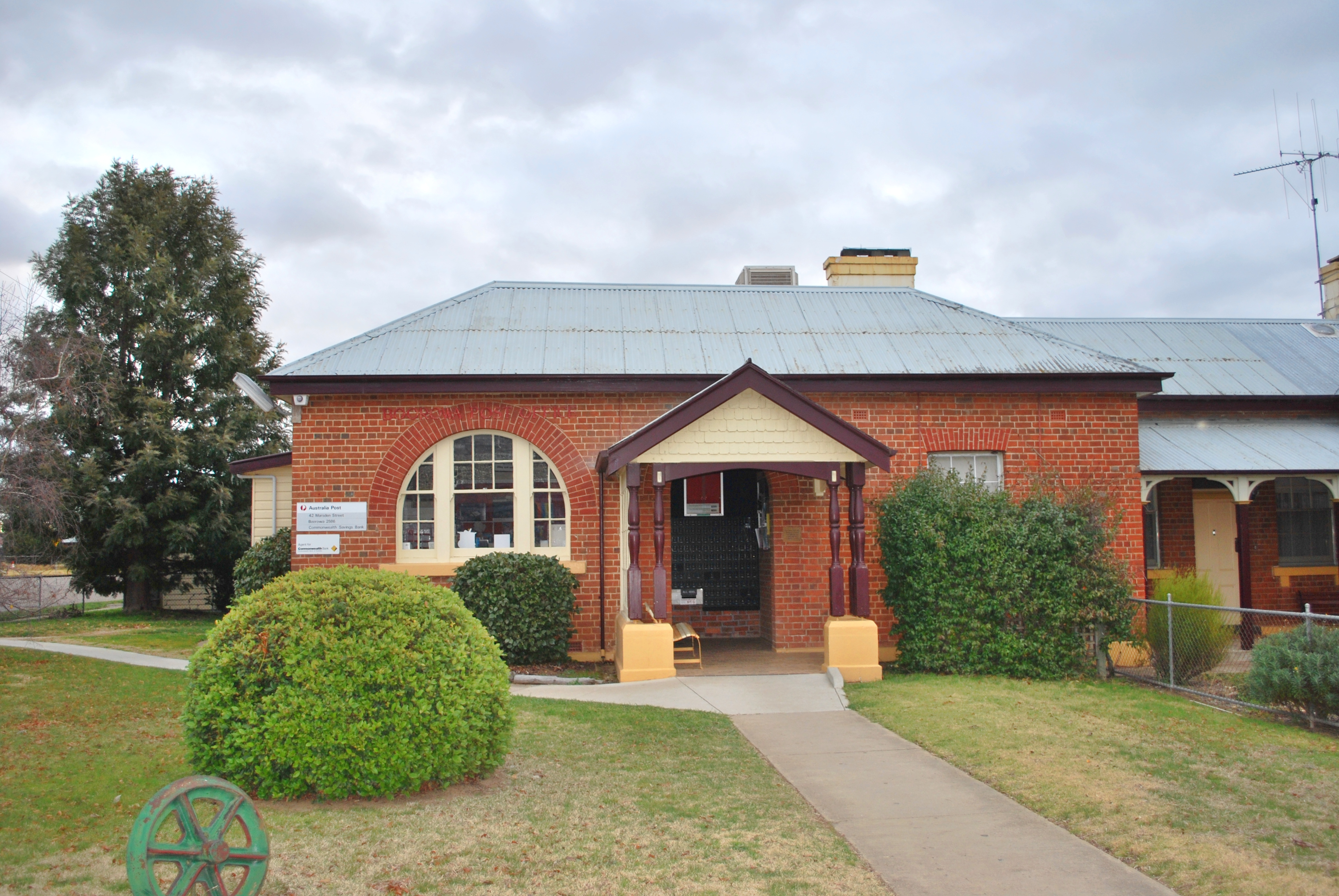
Old Boorowa Post Office, constructed in 1876

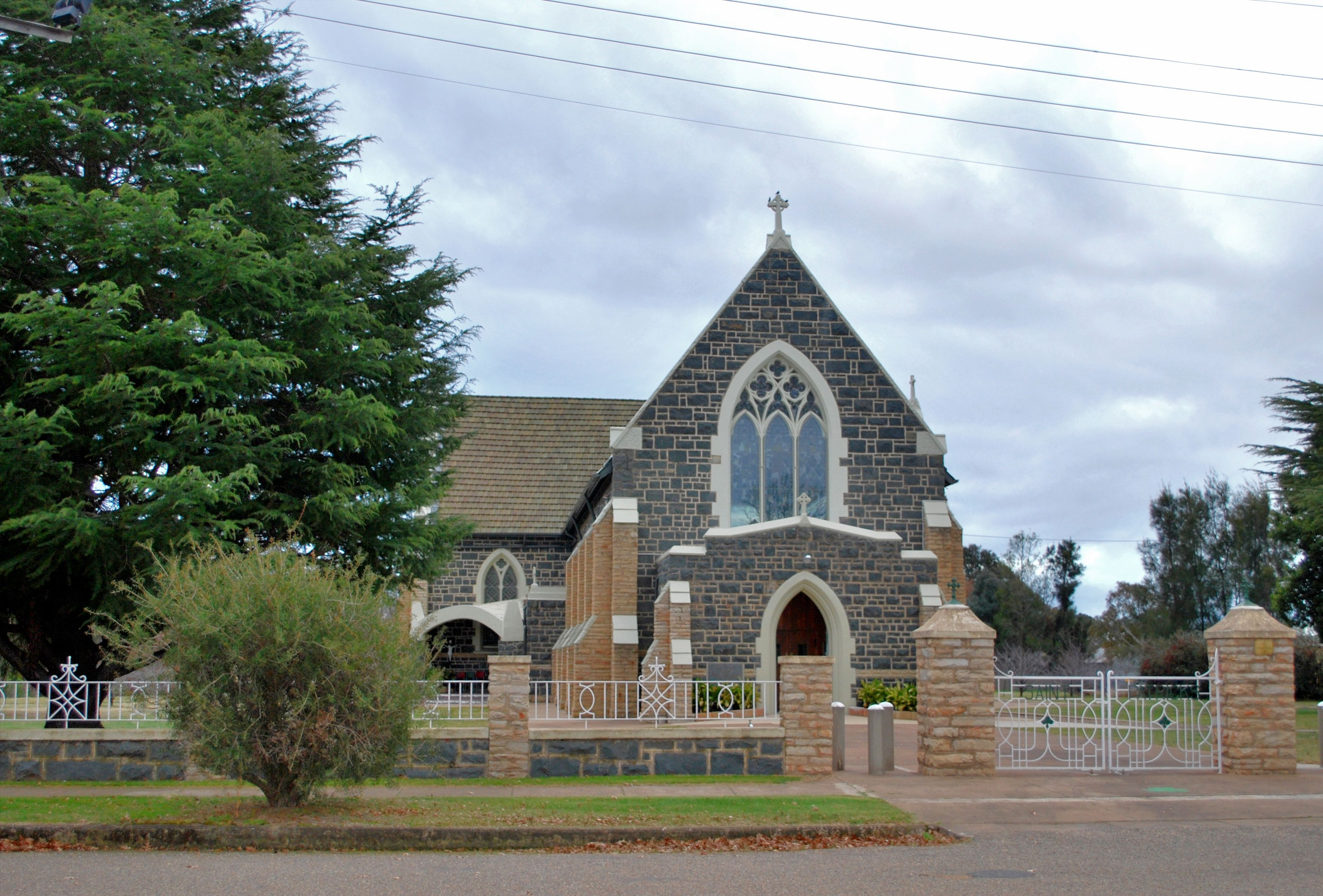
Roman Catholic Church, constructed in 1877
