= Giselle Galos =

Italian composer

Giselle Galos, commonly known as C. Galos, (sometimes misspelled Galas), was an obscure 19th century Italian or French musician and composer who is responsible for composing two popular pieces of salon music, Le Chant du Berger (Nocturne, Op. 17) and Le Lac de Come (Nocturne, Op. 24). Both pieces are in the form of nocturnes.

Galos' pieces often appear in collections of famous piano pieces.

Galos did not perform in public and her music was typically published under the pseudonym C. Galos. For many years there was debate regarding whether Galos was male or female. Music historians disagreed over what the composer's first name was, with suggestions from Celestino to Charles, based on the "C. Galos" pseudonym. Early publications of Galos' Le Lac de Como have subsequently been discovered under the names "Giselle Galos" and "Madmoiselle Giselle Galos", finally confirming the composer's full name.
