= Gallo =

Gallo may refer to:

== Related to Gaul ==
- related to Gaul
- Gallo language, the regional language of Upper Brittany, France

== Business and brands ==
- Gallo (beer), a brand of Cervecería Centro Americana in Guatemala
- Gallo Record Company, a South African record label
- Gallo (winery), previously E. & J. Gallo Winery, an American wine producer and distributor

== People ==
- Gallo (surname), including a list of people with the name

== Places ==
- Gallo Matese, Caserta, Italy
- Gällö, Bräcke Municipality, Jämtland County, Sweden
- Gallo (river), in Spain
- San Gallo, Italian name for St. Gallen

== See also ==
- Gallos (disambiguation)
- Galo (disambiguation)
  - Galo (footballer)
- Gaul (disambiguation)
- Gallo-Roman culture
- Gallo-Romance languages
- Gallo-Italic languages
  - Gallo-Italic of Sicily
- Gallo-Brittonic languages
- Gallo-Roman religion
