= Gaul (surname) =

Gaul is a surname. Notable people with the surname include:

- Alfred R. Gaul (1837–1913), English composer and conductor
- Arrah Lee Gaul (1888-1980), American painter
- August Gaul (1869–1922), German sculptor
- Charly Gaul (1932–2005), Luxembourgish cyclist
- David Gaul (1886–1962), American swimmer and 1904 Olympian
- Frank Gaul (born 1924), American politician
- Gilbert Gaul (artist) (1855–1919), American war artist
- Gilbert M. Gaul (born 1951), American journalist
- Harvey Bartlett Gaul (1881–1945), American composer
- Horace Gaul (1883–1939), ice hockey player
- Karl Gaul (1889–1972), German politician
- Michael Gaul (born 1973), former professional ice hockey defenceman
- William Gaul (1850–1927), Bishop of Mashonaland
