= William Galley =

English footballer

Personal information
- Full name: William Thomas Galley
- Date of birth: 2 March 1881
- Place of birth: Nantwich, England
- Date of death: 31 October 1941 (aged 60)
- Place of death: Nantwich, England
- Position: Left half

Senior career*
Years	Team	Apps	(Gls)
1897	Nantwich		(0)
1898	Crewe Alexandra		
1901	Nantwich		(1)
1902–1903	Shrewsbury Town		
1903	Glossop	11	(0)
1904	Bolton Wanderers		
1905–1907	Chester	43	(3)
1907	Crewe Alexandra		
- * Club domestic league appearances and goals

William Galley (2 March 1881 – 31 October 1941) was an English professional footballer who played in the Football League for Glossop as a left half.

== Personal life ==
Galley was married with two children and worked as a draper's assistant and buyer. Towards the end of the First World War, he enlisted as an Air Mechanic 3rd Class in the Royal Air Force and served with the Egyptian Expeditionary Force. Galley was discharged in April 1920. He was later employed as head of the furnishing department at Stretch & Harlock department store in Nantwich.
