= FV Gaul =

British deep sea factory ship

Coordinates: 72°04.1′N 25°05.3′E

History
- Name: Gaul (1973); Ranger Castor (1971)
- Owner: British United Trawlers (Hull) Ltd (1973–74); Ranger Fishing Company Ltd, North Shields (1971–73)
- Operator: British United Trawlers (Hull) Ltd
- Port of registry: Hull (Gaul); North Shields (Ranger Castor)
- Route: Arctic Ocean
- Builder: Brooke Marine Ltd, Lowestoft.
- Way number: 375
- Launched: 6 December 1971
- Completed: 1972
- Out of service: 1974
- Identification: H243 (Gaul); SN18 (Ranger Castor)
- Fate: Lost with all hands

General characteristics
- Class & type: Stern trawler/factory ship
- Tonnage: 1106
- Length: 66 m (216.9 ft)
- Beam: 12.3 m (40.2 ft)
- Ice class: III
- Propulsion: 1939 kW (2600 hp) 16 R.K.3M by Ruston Paxman

The fishing vessel Gaul was a deep sea factory ship based at Hull, United Kingdom. She was launched in December 1971 by Brooke Marine of Lowestoft, entering service during 1972 with the Ranger Fishing company, where she was registered at North Shields as Ranger Castor, SN18. She was renamed when Ranger Fishing was bought by British United Trawlers and re-registered at Hull as Gaul, H243.

She sank some time on the night of 8–9 February 1974 in storm conditions in the Barents Sea, north of Norway. No distress signal was received and her loss was not realised until 10 February after she twice failed to report in. An extensive search operation was launched but no trace of the ship was found, apart from a lifebuoy recovered three months later. All thirty-six crew were lost. The president of the British Trawler Federation described the loss of the Gaul as "the worst ever single-trawler tragedy". The wreck was finally located in 1997.

== Background ==
Gaul was one of four ships in her class, the others were Kurd, Kelt and Arab (later Kappin). She was a stern trawler, meaning that the nets were cast off of the back of the ship (rather than the side, as with a sidewinder trawler), and was also a filleter-freezer factory ship and processed fish, as well as catching it. This means she effectively had two crews, the 'sailing' crew and the factory crew. The Reopened Formal Investigation noted this as a potential risk factor if the factory crew were not fully conversant with the safe operation of Gaul.

== Final voyage ==
Gaul sailed from Hull on the morning of 22 January 1974. Mate George Petty became ill and was put ashore at Lødingen on the 26th. Maurice Spurgeon joined the crew on the 28th at Tromsø and Gaul arrived at the fishing grounds off the north coast of Norway the following day. On 8 February the sea state became severe. Reports from the skippers of other trawlers in the area give the wave height at between 6.5 and 9m, wind between 7 and 10 on the Beaufort scale.

At 09:30 Gaul reported to British United Trawlers that she was "laid and dodging" (Note: To lay and dodge means to keep the boat as stationary as possible, facing into the weather) off the North Cape Bank". At 10:30, as was company policy, she reported to the Orsino on the "Skipper's Freezer Schedule" – a summary of position, weather conditions, catch etcetera. A further report was due at 16:30 but Gaul, alone of the 17 British United Trawlers ships in the area at the time, failed to report.

By the afternoon of 10 February British United Trawlers had alerted their insurance company, UK Trawlers Mutual that Gaul had failed to report for two days. On the following morning the insurance company sent out a message to all the trawlers they insured reading

To all vessels fishing North Bank, Norway – all vessels please report any contact with the GAUL last reported fishing North Bank. Nil reports not required.

The aircraft carrier HMS Hermes was in the area and was ordered to commence searching. The search involved four other British ships, three Norwegian ships and 19 trawlers, coordinated by the Hermes. No evidence of the missing Gaul was found and the search was called off on the afternoon of 15 February.

== The 1970s Formal Investigation ==
The original Formal Investigation in 1974 concluded that the most likely reason for her loss was that she was overwhelmed by a succession of very large waves in heavy seas and capsized. The preliminary investigation had also found deficiencies in the maintenance of chutes, doors and hatches on Gaul's sister ship Kurd, but the relevance of this fact was downplayed by the 1974 formal inquiry.

Gaul was one of the most modern ships in the UK fishing fleet — she was only 18 months old — and relatives of the crew were reluctant to accept the investigation findings.

In 1975 a TV programme claimed she had been sunk while engaging in espionage and over the years other theories, including conspiracy theories, have been advanced:

- She was captured and interned by the Soviet Union because she was engaged in espionage.
- She was sunk by a Soviet submarine for the same reason.
- She collided with a submarine engaged in clandestine operations.
- She was dragged under after snagging her trawling gear in secret undersea cables (SOSUS).

== The wreck is found ==
In 1975 the Norwegian trawler Rairo reported snagging her nets on an undersea obstruction in the area where the Gaul was lost. In 1977, however, the UK government decided against launching a search based on this (and other similar) information, despite being confident that this was indeed Gaul. It was argued that such an investigation would add little new information in aid of safety at sea to justify the cost.

In 1997 a TV crew, with help from Norwegian experts located the wreck exactly where Rairo had reported the snagging of her nets. She was discovered to be located some 70 nautical miles (130 km; 81 mi) off the northern coast of Norway and lying in 919 feet (280 m) of water.

This prompted UK Deputy Prime Minister (and Hull MP) John Prescott to ask the Marine Accident Investigation Branch of the Department for Transport to carry out extensive surveys of the wreck, which it did in 1998 and 2002. During the latter part of the underwater survey in 2002, samples of bones and other human remains were recovered from the wreck, DNA tests conducted by the Forensic Science Service established that the remains came from four of the Gaul's crew. This finding quelled suspicions that the crew had been taken from the vessel by the Russians during cold war hostilities. After reviewing the factual evidence gained from the underwater surveys, the MAIB concluded that there was enough new evidence to warrant a new formal inquiry. The surveys revealed that some of Gaul's hatches and doors were open and, specifically, the outer non-return flaps and the inner covers to the duff and offal waste chutes were open. Additionally, the inner cover to the duff chute appeared to be secured open and the ship's steering gear (a steerable kort nozzle) was found to show between 10° and 15° of port helm. John Prescott concurred with the MAIB and a new investigation was launched (the 2004 Re-opened Formal Investigation (RFI)).

== 2004 inquiry ==
On 17 December 2004 the RFI concluded that these open chutes, doors and hatches had compromised the ship's watertight integrity and, combined with a following (and as already noted) heavy sea led to flooding on the factory deck. The chutes at the centre of the RFI's conclusions were the duff and offal chutes, used to dispose of unwanted marine organisms and fish processing waste respectively; the Wreck Commissioner, Mr Justice Steel, said of the poor condition of these chutes: "This reflects poorly on the maintenance and repair work performed by the owners and their staff."

The RFI also postulated that an attempted emergency manoeuvre by the Gaul's officer of the watch (a perfectly logical move to try to turn 'into the sea') (Note: The report claimed that the skipper and Mate, although experienced mariners, had never sailed in a ship of Gaul's class, specifically ships with separate factory crew.) caused 100 tonnes of floodwater to surge across to the starboard side of the ship leading to capsize and a catastrophic loss of stability. Further flooding then took place through open doors, chutes and hatches until the Gaul lost her reserves of buoyancy, she then sank very rapidly, stern first.

The report of the RFI dismissed the notion that Gaul was involved in espionage or that she was in a collision. It found that she was not fishing at the time of her loss, which indicated that no snagging (of the nets) could have occurred. Regarding espionage, Commander Clark RN told the inquiry that: "Skippers, radio officers and Mates of trawlers were involved in the low level observation and photography of Soviet vessels and aircraft and passive listening. This was on both a voluntary and an opportunity basis. General records and press cuttings on file indicate that some 30 to 40 Skippers were involved in the 1960s when this activity was at its peak. No records of trawler personnel involved in this activity exist in MOD files....However this type of intelligence gathering declined in the early 1970s. I have seen nothing to indicate that the crew of the FV GAUL were involved in this type of activity." (Note: The inquiry secured for the first time official confirmation that the UK government used trawlers for espionage during the Cold War, but found no evidence that Gaul was – or had ever been – so used.)

After reviewing this and other evidence relating to claims of espionage, the Commissioner for Wrecks Mr Justice Steel stated: "Whilst we can understand the belief that GAUL or some members of her crew might have been engaged in spying and the scepticism exhibited to all assurances to the contrary, we are convinced that the suspicions are misplaced".

However, in the immediate aftermath of the report, families of the dead crewmen said that they fear they will never find out the truth behind what caused the sinking.

In 2010 an independent and critical investigation was carried out into the Gaul's reserves of operational stability, the results of which revealed that she did not meet the IMCO (now IMO) minimum stability standards in all of her anticipated seagoing conditions.

== Memorial service ==
In February 2014, a memorial service was held on St. Andrew's Quay, Hull, to mark the 40th anniversary of the loss of the Gaul.

In 2024 there will be a multitude of different events held in Hull, from 8 to 15 February, in commemoration of the 50th Anniversary of The Gaul.

== Bibliography ==
- "Accident Investigation Report: Gaul". GOV.UK. Marine Accident Investigation Branch. 23 January 2015.
- Nicklin, John (1998). The Loss of the Motor Trawler GAUL. Hutton Press, Beverley. ISBN 1872167942.
- Steel, David (2004). Report of the re-opened formal investigation into the loss of the FV Gaul (PDF). HMSO. ISBN 0117034444.
