= John Galley =

English footballer (born 1944)

Personal information
- Full name: John Edward Galley
- Date of birth: 7 May 1944 (age 82)
- Place of birth: Clowne, England
- Height: 6 ft 1 in (1.85 m)
- Position: Centre forward

Youth career
- 1959–1961: Wolverhampton Wanderers

Senior career*
| Years | Team | Apps | (Gls) |
| 1961–1964 | Wolverhampton Wanderers | 5 | (2) |
| 1964–1967 | Rotherham United | 108 | (46) |
| 1967–1972 | Bristol City | 172 | (84) |
| 1972–1974 | Nottingham Forest | 37 | (6) |
| 1974 | → Peterborough United (loan) | 7 | (1) |
| 1974–1977 | Hereford United | 80 | (10) |
- Telford United
- * Club domestic league appearances and goals

John Edward Galley (born 7 May 1944) is an English former professional footballer who scored 149 goals from 409 games in the Football League playing as a centre forward for Wolverhampton Wanderers, Rotherham United, Bristol City, Nottingham Forest, Peterborough United and Hereford United during the 1960s and 1970s. He was part of the Hereford United side that won the Third Division title in 1976. After 14 seasons in the Football League, he dropped down into non-league football to play for Telford United.

Galley's older brothers Gordon and Maurice Galley also played in the Football League.
