= Gordon Galley =

English footballer (1930–2021)

Personal information
- Full name: Gordon Walter Galley
- Date of birth: 4 February 1930
- Place of birth: Worksop, England
- Date of death: 19 January 2021 (aged 90)
- Position: Outside left

Youth career
- 1945–1947: Sheffield Wednesday

Senior career*
Years	Team	Apps	(Gls)
1947–1948	Sheffield Wednesday	0	(0)
1948–1952	Darlington	60	(12)
- * Club domestic league appearances and goals

Gordon Walter Galley (4 February 1930 – 19 January 2021) was an English professional footballer who scored 12 goals from 60 appearances in the Football League playing as an outside left for Darlington in the years following the Second World War. He was also on the books of Sheffield Wednesday, but never played for them in the League. Teammate Baden Powell described him as "a lanky, tricky sort of player": After a transfer request produced no offers, Galley joined the police, from which he retired in 1982 after 30 years' service. He died on 19 January 2021 at the age of 90.

Galley's younger brothers Maurice and John Galley also played in the Football League.
