= Cornelis Galle =

Cornelis Galle or Cornelius Galle is the name of three engravers, father, son and grandson:

- Cornelis Galle the Elder or Cornelis Galle I, 1576–1650
- Cornelis Galle the Younger or Cornelis Galle II, 1615–1678
- Cornelis Galle III, born 1642
