= Maurice Galley =

English footballer (1934–2017)

Personal information
- Full name: Maurice Galley
- Date of birth: 10 August 1934
- Place of birth: Clowne, England
- Date of death: February 2017 (aged 82)
- Place of death: Nottinghamshire, England
- Height: 5 ft 10 in (1.78 m)
- Position: Wing half

Youth career
- 19??–1954: Chesterfield

Senior career*
Years	Team	Apps	(Gls)
1954–1959	Chesterfield	55	(5)
1959–1961	Boston United	72	(0)
1961–1962	Worksop Town		
1962–196?	Loughborough United		
- * Club domestic league appearances and goals

Maurice Galley (10 August 1934 – February 2017) is an English former footballer who scored 5 goals from 55 appearances in the Football League playing as a wing half for Chesterfield in the 1950s. He also played non-league football for teams including Boston United, Worksop Town, and Loughborough United, with whom he won the Midland League in 1962–63.

After his football career finished, Galley joined the police. He was a member of the Nottinghamshire Police football team that won the Police Athletic Association (PAA) Cup in 1969. Galley died in Nottinghamshire in February 2017 at the age of 82.

Galley's brothers Gordon and John Galley also played in the Football League.
