= Galong, New South Wales =

Galong
- Town
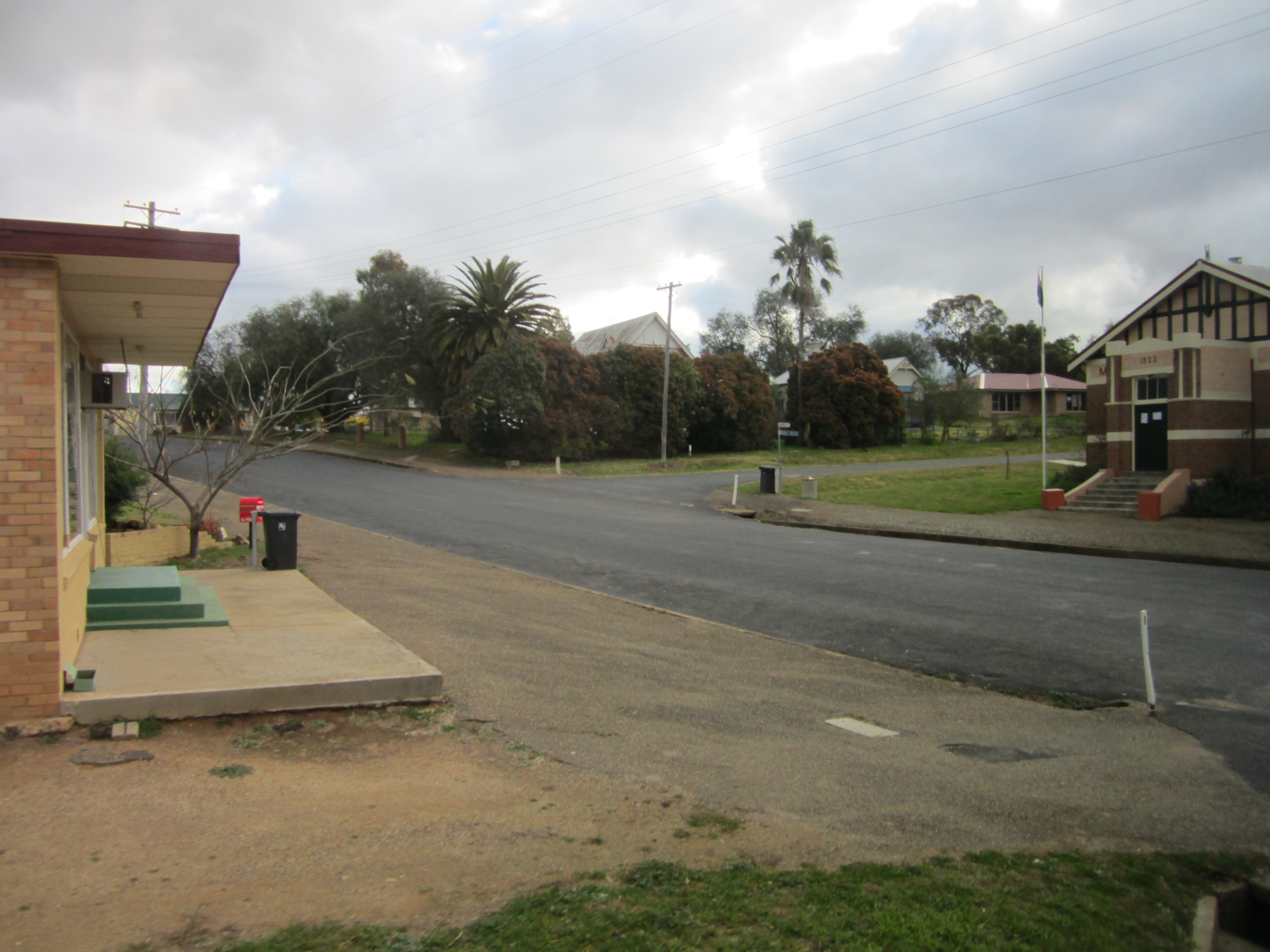
- McMahon Street in Galong

- Coordinates: 34°36′S 148°33′E
- Country: Australia
- State: New South Wales
- LGA: Hilltops Council

Government
  - State electorate: Cootamundra
  - Federal division: Riverina

Population
  - Total: 235 (SAL 2021)
- Postcode: 2585
- County: Harden

Galong is a village in New South Wales, Australia, in Hilltops Council. It is a typical Australian village located one hour's drive from the Australian Capital Territory (ACT).

== Mining ==
The major industry in the town is the limestone open-cut mine. The Galong deposit was first mined in 1885 with significant mining activity in the 1920s producing burnt lime or quicklime, which is used in the production of cement. The mine re-opened in the 1960s and again in 1994. In 2001, the lease was altered to extend the mineable area of land from 16 to 160 hectares (40 to 395 acres); resources of 20 million tonnes of limestone have been defined within the proposed limit of mining. In 2003, the mine was acquired by Boral. It now produces lime for agricultural lime used for farming canola and grains; agricultural lime is used for remediating soil acidity, a major problem threatening the productivity and sustainability of agriculture in many parts of the state. It produces approximately 300,000 tons per year, about one quarter of the requirements for the state of New South Wales. Apart from agricultural purposes, a major consumer of lime from Galong is the Port Kembla steel works. A kiln was built at the mine in 2003/04 to allow the production of quicklime for use in cement. The mine employs about 19 people.

== History ==
Squatter and former Irish convict 'Ned' Ryan took up land in the area around 1830 and built Galong House.

Galong Post Office opened on 15 April 1888.

St Clement's monastery was opened by the Redemptorists order of priests in 1918 and major additions opened in 1954. It educated some 2000 men before it closed in 1975. One student was commentator Greg Sheridan. It is now a retreat centre run by the Redemptorists and the Sisters of St Joseph, Goulburn.

The population of Galong increased from 122 in the 2006 census to 224 in the 2016 census and 235 in 2021.

Galong Uniting Church is a prominent building dating to 1922. It was designed by the architects Tate & Young. Previously it was a Methodist church until 1977 when it became a Uniting Church.

Many recollections of the town are available in the Galong Oral History Project

== Cemetery ==
The town is well known for its cemetery, which has among other monuments, some angels erected by Frank Rusconi, the monumental mason from Gundagai.

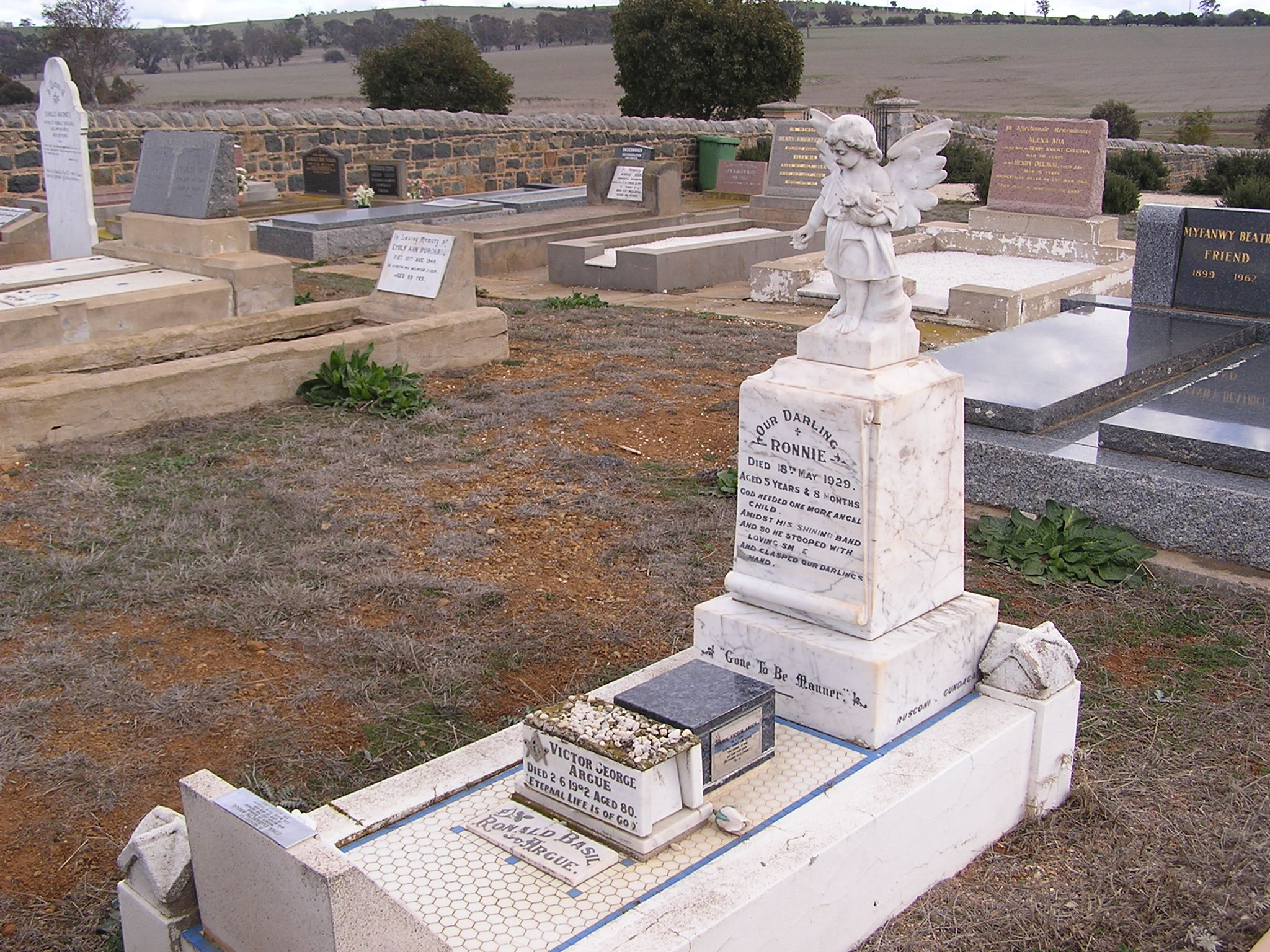
Child's grave

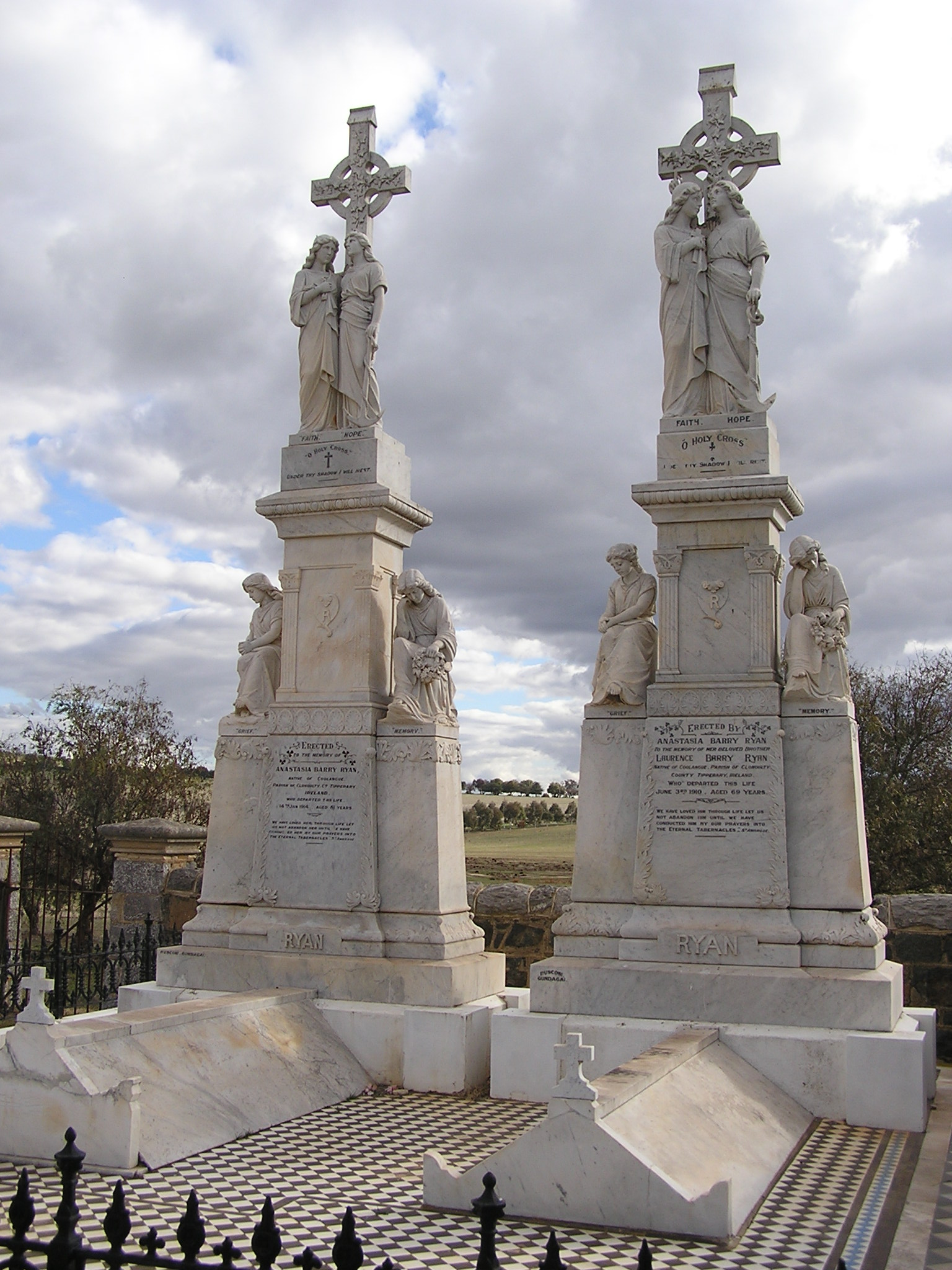
Ryan family white marble monuments

== Heritage listings ==
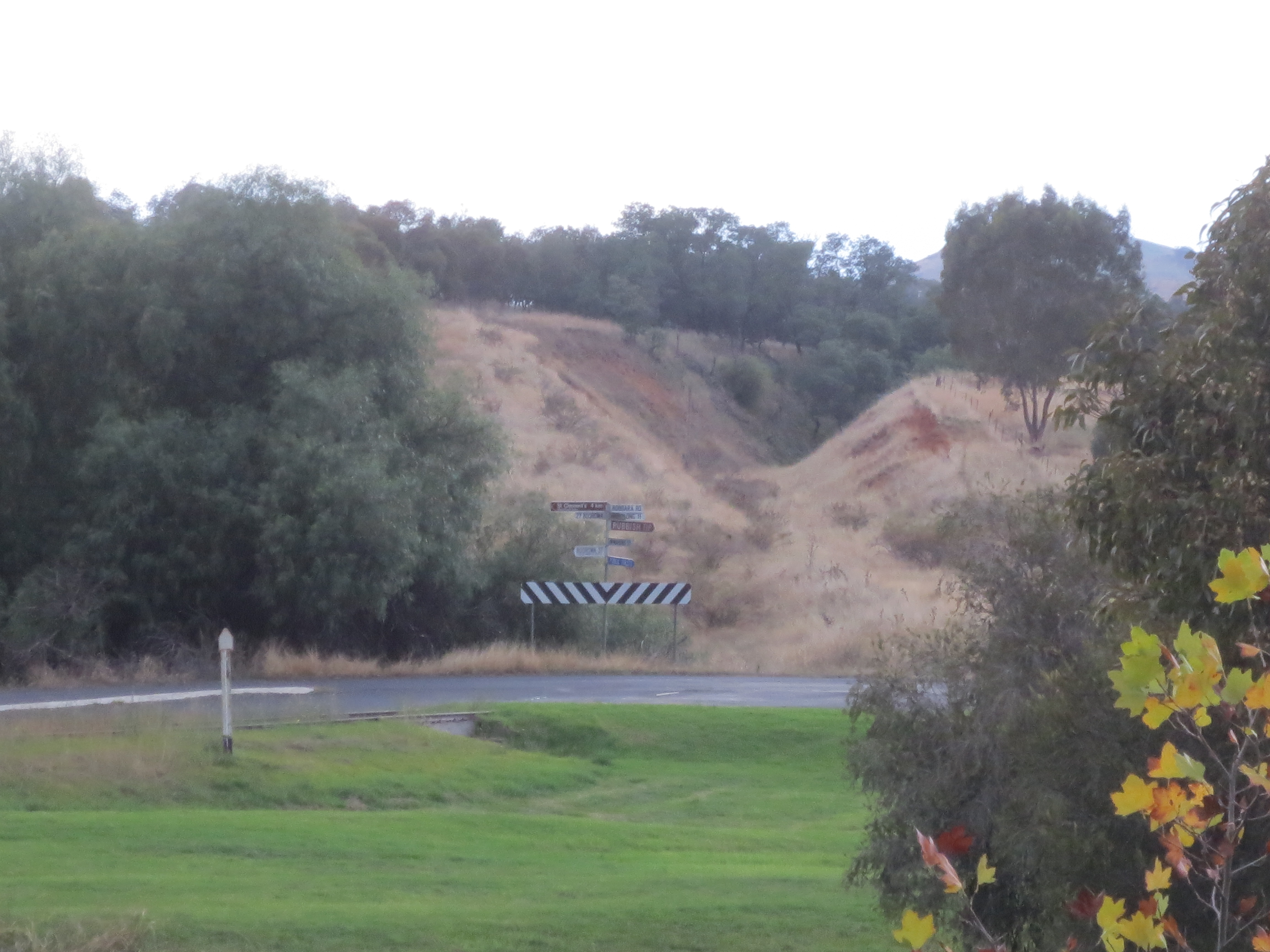
Abandoned Boorowa railway line cutting in Galong

Galong has a number of heritage-listed sites, including:

- Main Southern railway: Galong railway station

== See also ==
- Galong railway station
