= Galli (disambiguation) =

Galli were priests of the Phrygian goddess Cybele.

Galli may also refer to:

== Botany ==
- Crista-galli (disambiguation)
- Erythrina crista-galli, a flowering tree sometimes called cockspur coral tree
- Echinochloa crus-galli, a type of wild grass commonly known as cockspur (or cockspur grass), common barnyard grass, or simply barnyard grass
- Polylepis crista-galli, a species of plant in the family Rosaceae
- Crataegus crus-galli, a species of hawthorn

== People ==
- Gauls (Latin: Galli), the ancient people perceived by the Greeks and Romans as culturally or linguistically Celtic

=== Arts ===
- Galli da Bibiena family, a family of Italian artists of the 17th and 18th centuries, especially:
  - Ferdinando Galli-Bibiena or Ferdinando Galli Bibiena (1656–1743), also known as Ferdinando Galli da Bibiena or Bibbiena, Italian architect, designer, and painter
- Amelita Galli-Curci (1882–1963), Italian opera singer
- Amintore Galli (1845–1919), Italian music publisher, academic, and composer
- Caterina Galli, (c. 1723–1804), Italian opera singer
- Célestine Galli-Marié (1840–1905), French singer
- Daniela Galli (born 1972), Italian singer-songwriter known as Dhany
- Federica Galli (1932–2009), Italian artist
- Filippo Galli (bass) (1783–1853), Italian opera singer
- Giuseppe Galli (fl. 1598), Italian composer of the Baroque period
- Giuseppe Galli Bibiena (1696–1757), Italian designer
- Ida Galli (born 1939), Italian film actress
- Lina Galli (1899–1993), Italian writer
- Malu Galli (born 1971), Brazilian actress, playwright and stage director
- María Galli (1872–1960), Swiss-Uruguayan pianist, composer and music teacher
- Rosalinda Galli (born 1949), Italian voice actress
- Ruggero Galli, Italian opera singer active in the 19th and 20th centuries

=== Sports ===
- Agustín Galli (born 2004), Argentine footballer
- Aurora Galli (born 1996), Italian footballer
- B. J. Gallis (born 1975), Canadian football player
- Filippo Galli, (born 1963), Italian football player
- Francesca Galli (born 1960), Italian racing cyclist
- Carlo Galli (footballer) (1931–2022), Italian footballer
- Ernesto Galli (1945–2020), Italian professional football player and coach
- Giovanni Galli (born 1958), Italian football player and politician
- Gigi Galli or Gianluigi Galli (born 1973), Italian rally driver
- Jessica Galli (born 1983), American wheelchair athlete
- Jole Galli (born 1995), Italian freestyle skier
- Leonardo Galli (born 1997), Italian professional footballer
- Lorenzo Galli (born 1979), retired Italian alpine skier
- Nanni Galli (1940–2019), Italian sports-car racer
- Niccolò Galli (footballer, born 1983) (1983–2001), Italian footballer
- Niccolò Galli (footballer, born 1988), Italian footballer
- Nikos Galis (born 1957), Greek professional basketball player
- Remo Galli (1912–1993), Italian professional football player and coach.
- Sandro Galli (born 1987), Swiss footballer

=== Science and technology ===
- Franz San Galli, Russian: Франц Карлович Сан Галли, Franz Karlovich San Galli (1824–1908), Russian businessman who invented the radiator
- Giuseppe Galli (1933-2016), Italian Gestalt psychologist
- Nadiashda Galli-Shohat (died 1948), Russian physicist
- Ricardo Galli or Ricardo Adolfo Galli Granada, computer scientist
- Stephen J. Galli (born 1947), American pathologist

=== Other people ===
- Adam Blue Galli, armed robber arrested in 1992
- Carlo Galli (diplomat) (1878–1966), Italian diplomat
- Carlo Galli (political scientist) (born 1950), Italian political scientist and politician
- G. Fred Galli (1902–1967), American cheesemaker and legislator
- Giorgio Galli (historian) (1928–2020), Italian political scientist, historian, and academic
- Giorgio Galli (watchmaker), Italian watch designer
- Olivia Galli (born 1998), American social media influencer
- Philippe Galli (born 1956), French prefect

== Places ==
- Amintore Galli Theatre, a theatre and opera house in Rimini, Italy

== Other uses ==
- The Funeral of the Anarchist Galli (Italian, Il Funerale dell’anarchico Galli), a 1911 painting by Italian painter Carlo Carrà of Angelo Galli (died 1904)

== See also ==
- Crista galli, a bone
- Galli–Galli disease
- Galli-Curci Theatre
- Ascaridia galli (A. galli), a parasitic roundworm
- Galli Galli Sim Sim, the Indian Hindi-language adaptation of the children's television program Sesame Street
- Li Galli (the Gallos), an archipelago of islands off the Amalfi Coast, Italy
- Pieter Gallis (1633–1697), a Dutch Golden Age painter
- Gala, priests of the goddess Inanna
- "Galliyan", a song by Ankit Tiwari from the 2014 Indian film Ek Villain
- Gali (disambiguation)
- Galle (disambiguation)
- Galley (disambiguation)
- Gallus (disambiguation)
- Gally (disambiguation)
- Gully (disambiguation)
