= James Gulley =

James Gulley may refer to:

- James Gulley (basketball) (born 1965), American basketball player
- James L. Gulley, American cancer researcher and the Director of the Medical Oncology Service at National Cancer Institute

== See also ==
- Gulley surname
- James Manby Gully (1808-1883), Victorian medical doctor
- Gully (disambiguation)
