= 1788 in Connecticut =

- Decades: 1760s; 1770s; 1780s; 1790s; 1800s
- See also: History of Connecticut; Historical outline of Connecticut; List of years in Connecticut; 1788 in the United States

The following is a list of events of the year 1788 in Connecticut.

== Incumbents ==
- Governor: Samuel Huntington

== Events ==
- January 9 - Connecticut ratified the US Constitution with a 128 to 40 vote

== Births ==
- May 20 – Henry H. Gurley, Representative from Louisiana (d. 1833)
- June 17 – Josiah Holbrook, educator (d. 1854)
- September 11 – Samuel Nott, pioneer (d. 1869)
- September 26 – Charles Robert Sherman, Ohio Supreme Court judge (d. 1829)
- November 7 – Isaac Jennings, medical doctor (d. 1874)
- November – Titus Bronson, founder of Kalamazoo, Michigan (d. 1853)

== See also ==
- 1788 in the United States
