= 1848 in Connecticut =

- Decades: 1820s; 1830s; 1840s; 1850s; 1860s
- See also: History of Connecticut; Historical outline of Connecticut; List of years in Connecticut; 1848 in the United States

The following is a list of events of the year 1848 in Connecticut.

== Incumbents ==
Governor: Clark Bissell

== Events ==
- June 12 – "An Act to Prevent Slavery" became law, which abolished slavery in Connecticut

== Births ==
- January 23 – Lewis Sperry, member of the Connecticut House of Representatives (d. 1922)
- May 24 – Horatio J. Homer, first African-American police officer in Boston (d. 1923)
- August 24 – George Bartholomew (inventor), inventor of concrete pavement (d. 1933)

== Deaths ==
- August 16 – Alfred Gurdon Gulley, American horticulturist and educator
- October 12 – Arthur C. Butts, lawyer, judge, and politician from New York
