= 2025 in Connecticut =

- Decades: 2000s; 2010s; 2020s
- See also: History of Connecticut; Historical outline of Connecticut; List of years in Connecticut; 2025 in the United States

The following is a list of events of the year 2025 in Connecticut.

== Incumbents ==
=== State government ===
- Governor: Ned Lamont (D)

== Events ==
- March 22 – Trinity College beats New York University 64–60 to win the NCAA Division III men's basketball tournament.
- April 6 – The UConn Huskies women's basketball team win the NCAA Division I women's basketball championship, beating the South Carolina Gamecocks 82–59 to win their first championship since 2016. UConn's Azzi Fudd is named the Most Outstanding Player.
- April 15 – Paier College, which lost its accreditation in March, notifies the state of Connecticut that it will be shutting down.
- May 28 – President Donald Trump pardons former Connecticut Governor John G. Rowland, who was convicted in connection to a campaign finance fraud case.
- June 28 – The inaugural NASCAR Craftsman Truck Series at Lime Rock race takes place at Lime Rock Park.
- August 5 – A 56-year-old man kills his mother Suzanne Adams and himself in a murder-suicide in Greenwich. An investigation finds the man had extensive interactions with the ChatGPT chatbot and believed Adams was trying to poison him.
- August 18 – Four people, including two children, are killed in a house fire in Hartford.
- August 22 – The U.S. Court of Appeals for the Second Circuit rules that a state law banning assault weapons does not violate the second amendment. The law was signed in 2013 following the Sandy Hook Elementary School shooting.
- September 18 – Connecticut and nine other Northeastern states announce the formation of the Northeast Public Health Collaborative, a coalition of local health leaders.
- October 4 – The Hartford Athletic beat the Sacramento Republic FC 1–0 to win the 2025 USL Cup.
- November 4 – 2025 Stamford mayoral election: Incumbent Mayor Caroline Simmons wins reelection.

=== Sports ===
- 2024–25 UConn Huskies men's ice hockey season
- 2024–25 Yale Bulldogs men's ice hockey season

== See also ==
- 2025 in the United States
