= 1875 in Connecticut =

- Decades: 1850s; 1860s; 1870s; 1880s; 1890s
- See also: History of Connecticut; Historical outline of Connecticut; List of years in Connecticut; 1875 in the United States

The following is a list of events of the year 1875 in Connecticut.

== Incumbents ==
Governor: Charles Roberts Ingersoll

Lieutenant Governor: George G. Sill

== Events ==
- April 5-
  - 1875 United States House of Representatives elections in Connecticut
  - 1875 Connecticut gubernatorial election
  - 1875 Connecticut lieutenant gubernatorial election
- July 22 - Statue of Horace Wells is unveiled and dedicated

=== Date unknown ===
- Yale Rugby is founded

== Births ==
- March 29 - Treat Baldwin Johnson, chemist

== Deaths ==
- February 5 - William A. Buckingham, former Governor of Connecticut and US Senator
- November 21 - Orris S. Ferry, former US Senator
- September 15 - William Oliver Stone, painter
