= Civeta Investment =

Spanish company

Civeta Investment, S.A. is a Madrid-based company that invests in Internet startups.

Civeta was created in March 2013 by a few Spanish business angels from several sectors. By the publication of a 2015 review, the company had experienced "intense activity in 2014" (Note: The original Spanish-language article used the phrase "una actividad intensa en 2014".) and noted the company among six of "the most active in venture capital" in Spain. (Note: The full quote was "Los más activos en venture capital fueron, entre otros, Conector Startup, Civeta Investments, SeedRocket, Business Booster, Wayra o Plug and Play, todos ellos orientados a potenciar proyectos tecnológicos.")

== Context ==
Startups are big business in Spain. Between 2013 and 2014, investment in Spanish investment technologies rose by nearly 30% – a total of 320 million euros. As of 2015, startups accounted for half of the venture capital investment in Spain.

A report by the consulting firm Venture Watch found that Spanish technology start-ups drew more than 227 million euros in financing in 2014, and about 29% more – more than 320 million euros – in 2014.

== Investments ==
According to its official website, Civeta has made 39 investments since March 2013, and has a unicorn in its portfolio despite the fact that Civeta Investment only invests in seed and pre-seed stage startups.

Civita's startups offer a wide variety of services, from ride-sharing apps to educational sites, sites linking jobseekers with potential employers, smart thermostat systems, and tools for tracking car keys.

According to a 2014 year-end review of SeedRocket's startups, "special attention is required for Sitka Capital and Civeta Investment which have had an amazing year." According to figures from Venture Watch Research, between December 2013 and December 2014, Civeta ranked as SeedRocket's six most successful startups by number of IT operations. Civeta completed eight IT operations during this timeframe – an 800% increase from the previous year's total of one.

== Fintech ==
In 2016, the first Civeta Fintech Meetings were held in Madrid. Civeta invited "fintech market players, such as associations, investors, and startups, [to] analyz[e] the trends of the sector and the opportunities it offers to entrepreneurs." A review of the summit reported that "the fintech market wanted to dedicate the first of its thematic days [to] Civeta Investments, a venture capital company founded by Daniel Seijo, Menéame CEO, and Gonzalo Ruiz Utrilla, who invests in internet startups." (Note: The original Spanish text reads: "Precisamente al mercado fintech ha querido dedicarle la primera de sus jornadas temáticas [a] Civeta Insvestments [sic], empresa de capital riesgo fundada por Daniel Seijo, CEO de Menéame, y Gonzalo Ruiz Utrilla, que invierte en startups de internet.")

== See also ==
- Startup investing
- Internet startup
- Fintech
