= 2023 in Connecticut =

- Decades: 2000s; 2010s; 2020s
- See also: History of Connecticut; Historical outline of Connecticut; List of years in Connecticut; 2023 in the United States

The following is a list of events of the year 2023 in Connecticut.

== Incumbents ==
=== State government ===
- Governor: Ned Lamont (D)

== Events ==
- June 12 – The city of New Haven reaches a settlement of $45 million with Richard "Randy" Cox. Cox was paralyzed in June 2022 after he was placed in a New Haven Police van without a seatbelt, causing paralysis when the van came to an abrupt stop and slammed Cox against the door. At $45 million, the settlement is the largest in U.S. history, surpassing the $27 million settlement the city of Minneapolis reached with the family of George Floyd in 2021.
- June 29 – Smoke from the Canadian wildfires is reported to have entered several U.S. states, including Connecticut.
- July 1 – Connecticut State Community College is established.
- July 9 – July 20: July 2023 Northeastern United States floods

== See also ==
- 2023 in the United States
