= 2022 in Connecticut =

- Decades: 2000s; 2010s; 2020s
- See also: History of Connecticut; Historical outline of Connecticut; List of years in Connecticut; 2022 in the United States

The following is a list of events of the year 2022 in Connecticut.

== Incumbents ==
=== State government ===
- Governor: Ned Lamont (D)

== Events ==
- October 12 – Two police officers are killed and another is wounded during an ambush in Bristol. The perpetrator is killed after the shooting.
- November 8 – 2022 Connecticut gubernatorial election

== See also ==
- 2022 in the United States
