= Gali =

Gali may refer to:

- Francisco Gali, a 16th-century Spanish sailor and cartographer
- Gali (character), a character in Marvel Comics and Marvel Rivals
- Gali (town), a town in Abkhazia, Georgia
- Gali District, Abkhazia
- Gali Municipality, Autonomous Republic of Abkhazia
- Gali, Kermanshah, a village in Kermanshah Province, Iran
- Gali, Zanjan, a village in Zanjan Province, Iran
- Gali, a fictional character in the Bionicle franchise produced by Lego
- Boutros Boutros-Ghali, due to a different transliteration
- Ghali (disambiguation), due to a different transliteration
- Galli
- Galli (disambiguation), due to a different transliteration
- Gully (disambiguation)
- "Galliyan" (lit. 'Alleys'), a song by Ankit Tiwari from the 2014 Indian film Ek Villain

== Pakistan ==
Gali (Urdu: گلی) refers to an alley or alleyway which is a narrow pedestrian lane in a city or a mountain path or a mountain valley. Galyat is plural of Gali. The following are some Galayat in Pakistan:

- Dunga Gali
- Ghora Gali
- Nathia Gali
- Khaira Gali
- Bara Gali
- Darya Gali
- Chehr Gali
- Galyat, plural of Gali in Urdu
- Jhika Gali
- Changla Gali
- Berin Gali
