= 1965 in Connecticut =

- Decades: 1940s; 1950s; 1960s; 1970s; 1980s
- See also: History of Connecticut; Historical outline of Connecticut; List of years in Connecticut; 1965 in the United States

The following is a list of events of the year 1956 in Connecticut.

== Events ==
- March 29 to March 30 - Griswold v. Connecticut was argued in front of the Supreme Court
- June 7 - the Supreme Court ruled on Griswold v. Connecticut
- August - Subway is founded in Bridgeport, Connecticut
- December 14 - the new Connecticut constitution is approved by the voters
- December 30 - the new Connecticut constitution is adopted

== Births ==
- May 27 - Henry U. Harder, Adjutant general of Vermont

=== Undated ===
- Elizabeth Peyton, artist

== Deaths ==
- September 16 - Harold Bloomer, fencer and Olympian
- November 18 - Henry A. Wallace, 33rd vice-president of the United States
