= 2024 in Connecticut =

- Decades: 2000s; 2010s; 2020s
- See also: History of Connecticut; Historical outline of Connecticut; List of years in Connecticut; 2024 in the United States

The following is a list of events of the year 2024 in Connecticut.

== Incumbents ==
=== State government ===
- Governor: Ned Lamont (D)

== Events ==
- January 9 – Connecticut United FC is established in the MLS Next Pro.
- April 2 –
  - 2024 Connecticut Democratic presidential primary
  - 2024 Connecticut Republican presidential primary
- April 8 – In college basketball, Connecticut repeats as national champions, becoming the first program to do so since the Florida Gators did so in 2006 and 2007.
- April 22 – Police arrest 48 pro-Palestinian protesters at Yale University following a multi-day encampment protest.
- April 30 – Police arrest 25 pro-Palestinian protesters at the University of Connecticut and clear an encampment students had set up.
- August 19 – Two people are killed by flooding in Oxford.
- November 5 – 2024 Connecticut House of Representatives election

== See also ==
- 2024 in the United States
