= 2026 in Connecticut =

- Decades: 2000s; 2010s; 2020s
- See also: History of Connecticut; Historical outline of Connecticut; List of years in Connecticut; 2026 in the United States

The following is a list of events of the year 2026 in Connecticut.

== Incumbents ==
=== State Government ===
- Governor: Ned Lamont (D)

== Events ==
- January 6 – The Department of Justice sues the state of Connecticut for failing to produce full voter registration lists upon request.
- January 27
  - Yale University announces free tuition to families with incomes below $200,000.
  - Hartford Mayor Arunan Arulampalam sends a request to terminate an agreement allowing Immigration and Customs Enforcement to use a city-owned parking lot.
- February 27 – Defense Secretary Pete Hegseth announces the DoD will no longer allow military members to attend Yale University, among other schools.
- March 19 – The New York Islanders announces they are relocating their American Hockey League affiliate, the Bridgeport Islanders, to Hamilton, Ontario, Canada.
- March 27 – ESPN reports that the Connecticut Sun of the WNBA will be sold to the Fertitta family and relocated to Houston, Texas, where the Fertitta-owned Houston Rockets play.
- April 6 – ICE agents detain a 19-year-old high school student in Cheshire. The student is the son of an Afghan interpreter who was previously detained by ICE in 2025. On April 20, an immigration judge orders his release.
- April 13 – The Department of Justice sues the city of New Haven and the state of Connecticut, arguing their sanctuary laws interfere with the government's enforcement of immigration laws.
- July 17 – The Connecticut Department of Energy and Environmental Protection sends a firefighting crew to Canada to assist fighting ongoing wildfires.
- August 25 – A surge in ICE detainments is reported in southwestern Connecticut, including in the cities of Danbury, Stamford, and Bridgeport.
- September 17 – Deputy Budget Director and former State Representative Kosta Diamantis flees the country for Greece, where he also holds citizenship, ahead of his federal sentencing for corruption charges.
- September 24 – The Connecticut Sun plays their last game in Connecticut at Mohegan Sun Arena, where they defeat the Toronto Tempo 95–81.
- October 21 – The University of Connecticut announces M&T Bank has acquired the naming rights to Harry A. Gampel Pavilion.
- October 31 – Senator Chris Murphy suffers a stroke and is hospitalized.
- November 3 – 2026 Connecticut gubernatorial election: Incumbent Governor Ned Lamont wins reelection, beating State Representative Ryan Fazio.

== See also ==
- 2026 in the United States
