= Galli–Galli disease =

- This condition is inherited in an autosomal dominant manner.
- Specialty: Dermatology

Galli–Galli disease is a rare inherited condition that has close resemblance clinically to Dowling-Degos' disease, but is histologically distinct, characterized by skin lesions that are 1- to 2-mm slightly keratotic red to dark brown papules which are focally confluent in a reticulate pattern. The disease is also characterized by slowly progressive and disfiguring reticulate hyperpigmentation of the flexures, clinically and histopathologically diagnostic for Dowling-Degos disease but also associated with suprabasal, nondyskeratotic acantholysis.

== See also ==
- List of cutaneous conditions
- Skin lesion
