= Gully (disambiguation) =

A gully is a small valley.

Gully or The Gully may also refer to:

== Arts and entertainment ==
- Gully (album), a 2003 album by Indian band Euphoria
- Gully (film), a 2019 film
- Gully Foyle, protagonist of the novel The Stars My Destination by Alfred Bester
- A character in the Battle Chasers comic book series

== Places ==
- Gully, Minnesota, a small city in the United States
- Gully Township, Polk County, Minnesota, United States
- The Gully (Atlantic), an undersea canyon off the eastern coast of North America

== People ==
- Gully (surname)

== Other uses ==
- A storm drain
- Overflow relief gully, a plumbing fitting used to prevent sewage from overflowing inside buildings
- Gully, a fielding position in the sport of cricket; see slip
- Gully, the mascot of Brighton & Hove Albion F.C.
- "The Gully", nickname of a key ravine in the Moro River Campaign in Italy in World War II
- The Gully, an internet magazine co-founded by Kelly Cogswell and Ana Simo

== See also ==
- Gali (disambiguation)
- Galli (disambiguation)
- Gully cricket, an informal form of cricket, played in South Asia
- Gulley, a surname
