= Gallus =

Gallus may refer to:

== People ==
- Saint Gall or Gallus (c. 550 – c. 646), Irish monk
- Gallus Anonymus, 12th-century Polish historian
- Agnes Gallus, (1930–2010), Hungarian Canadian artist
- Gallus (bishop of Transylvania), 13th-century Hungarian prelate
- Gallus Mag, 19th-century female bouncer at a New York bar
- Georg Gallus (1927–2021), German politician
- Chris Gallus (born 1943), Australian politician
- Thomas Gallus (c. 1200–1246), French theologian
- Jacobus Gallus (1550–1591), Slovene composer
- Nicolaus Gallus (c. 1516–1570), German Lutheran Reformer
- Sandor Gallus (1907–1996), Australian archaeologist

=== Romans ===
- Aelius Gallus, Roman prefect of Egypt
- Constantius Gallus (326–354), junior Roman emperor from 351 to 354
- Cornelius Gallus (c. 70–26 BC), Roman poet, orator and politician
- Quintus Roscius Gallus (c. 126–62 BC), Roman actor
- Trebonianus Gallus (206–253), Roman emperor

== Animal-related ==
- Gallus (bird), a genus of birds including junglefowl and domestic chickens
- Gallus Lacepède, 1802, a synonym for the fish genus Alectis
- Gallus (constellation), the cockerel, an obsolete constellation

== Other ==
- Gallus, the singular form of Galli, the eunuch priests of the Phrygian goddess Cybele
- Gallus (album), 1992 album by Scottish rock band Gun
- Gallus (Frankfurt am Main), a district of Frankfurt, Germany
- Gallus (professional wrestling), a Scottish professional wrestling stable

== See also ==
- Galli (disambiguation)
