= Gully (surname) =

Gully is a surname. Notable people with the surname include:

- James Manby Gully (1808–1883), English medical doctor known for practising hydrotherapy
- John Gully (1783–1863), English prize-fighter, horse racer and politician
- John Gully (artist) (1819–1888), New Zealand landscape painter
- William Gully, 1st Viscount Selby (1835–1909), British lawyer and politician, son of James Gully

== See also ==
- Gulley, another surname
