= Adam Blue Galli =

American robber

Adam Blue Gallis was one of a group of criminals known as the "Preppie Bandits" (due to their clean cut appearance, a propensity for dressing like "preppies", and their habit of hanging out in Salt Lake City's coffeeshops). They operated in and around Salt Lake City, Utah, in 1992. The other members were his brother Aaron Galli and his cousins Nathan and Christopher. He fled the state after being charged with murder and robbery, and was recaptured after being featured on America's Most Wanted. Patrons and employees at the restaurant where the murder occurred were watching the program, and alerted police to the presence of another person featured on the same episode, who was currently working at the same restaurant.

== Armed robberies ==
In 1992, Galli, along with his brother Aaron, and two cousins, Nathan and Christopher Galli, committed a string of armed robberies in Salt Lake City. On April 29, 1992, Galli, Nathan and Christopher robbed the King's English Bookstore in Salt Lake City. Galli and Christopher went inside the bookstore while Nathan waited outside for the purpose of running interference if the police were called. Galli pointed a gun at the store clerk and took approximately $250 in cash from the two cash registers at the store.

On May 5, 1992, Galli and Christopher, armed with handguns, robbed the Trolley Corners Theaters. While Galli and Christopher were inside the theater, Aaron and Nathan waited outside in a separate car to keep lookout. After stealing approximately $900 in cash from the theater, Galli and Christopher fled, pursued by a witness. Nathan pulled up in the car and told the witness to call the police while he chased the robbers to obtain their license plate number.

On June 6, 1992, Galli, wearing a black wig, entered the Tool Shed and pointed a gun at store clerk Sylvia Nordhoff. He told her, "This is a stickup, give me all of your money or I'll kill you." When Ms. Nordhoff refused to hand over the money, Galli grabbed nearly $180 in cash from the cash register and fled. Ms. Nordoff tackled him just outside the store, where her son Michael helped her hold Galli down. Christopher Galli, who was waiting outside, threatened Ms. Nordhoff and her son with a weapon and told them to let Adam go. Galli and Christopher then ran to their car and drove off. When witnesses attempted to pursue the two men, Nathan drove up and told them to call the police while he chased the robbers. Nathan later returned to the scene and gave false information to the police.

== Charges ==
In June and July 1992, Galli was charged with all three armed robberies and warrants for his arrest were issued. On July 10, 1992, he was arrested in King County, Washington. While being held in the King County Jail in Seattle, he was advised of his Miranda rights by two detectives from the Salt Lake City Police Department. Galli voluntarily waived his Miranda rights, and during questioning, confessed to all three robberies. Galli later moved to suppress his statements to the police, contending that during questioning he had reinvoked both his right to counsel and his right to remain silent. His claim that his confession was therefore obtained in violation of Miranda v. Arizona was later denied.

Prior to his trial, Galli was released from custody after his family posted $40,000 bond. However, in November, Galli, facing a total of five charges for armed robbery, fled the state in anticipation of being charged with the May 17, 1992, murder of Green Parrot Restaurant employee Merritt Riordan, murdered during a botched robbery attempt. Galli's family forfeited nearly $40,000 in cash and real estate as a result of his flight from justice. The murder charge against Galli was eventually dropped due to lack of evidence.

== Arrest ==
In August 1995, Galli, then living under the alias "August Cedergren", was arrested at his job at a Northfield, Minnesota, cabinetmaking shop following an anonymous tip to the FBI. It is believed the tip came from a Northfield resident who recognized him from a photograph on a Wanted poster in the local Post Office. Upon his return to Utah, Galli pleaded guilty to three of five aggravated robbery counts—the other two charges were dismissed in a plea-bargain deal.

== Sentence ==
Judge Pat B. Brian sentenced him to an indeterminate term of five years to life in prison and ordered him to pay $40,000 in restitution to his family for the money they forfeited when he absconded. Judge Glenn K. Iwasaki sentenced him to an indeterminate term of five years to life in prison with his sentence to run consecutively to Judge Brian's sentence. Judge Kenneth Rigtrup also sentenced him to five years to life in prison with his sentence to run consecutively to the sentences imposed by Judge Brian and Judge Iwasaki. The order of restitution was later erased.

== Parole ==
A parole board later granted Galli an early release.
