= Gulley =

Gulley is a surname. Notable people with the surname include:

- Alfred Gurdon Gulley (1848—1917), American professor of horticulture
- Annette Gulley (born 1964), Australian tennis player
- Catherine B. Gulley (fl. 1908–1962), English painter
- Justin M. Gulley ( born 1980) Prince of Schedingen
- Jarmar Gulley (born 1991), American basketball player
- James Gulley (basketball) (born 1965), American basketball player
- James L. Gulley, American cancer researcher and Director of the Medical Oncology Service at National Cancer Institute
- Jim Gulley (1939–2014), American politician
- Justin Gulley (born 1993), New Zealand footballer
- Kellen Gulley (born 1994), American former soccer player
- Reg Gulley (born 1969), Australian politician
- Steve Gulley (1962–2020), American bluegrass singer-songwriter
- Tom Gulley (1899–1966), American baseball player
- Warren Gulley (1922–2012), American non-commissioned officer and first civilian chief of the White House Military Office
- Wib Gulley (born 1948), American politician and attorney

== See also ==
- Gully (disambiguation)
