= Agustín Galli =

Argentine footballer

Personal information
- Date of birth: 17 November 2004 (age 21)
- Place of birth
- Position: Forward

Team information
- Current team: Belgrano

Youth career
- Belgrano

Senior career*
Years	Team	Apps	(Gls)
2021–	Belgrano	1	(0)
- * Club domestic league appearances and goals as of 23:04, 10 August 2021 (UTC)

Agustín Galli (born 17 November 2004) is an Argentine footballer currently playing as a midfielder for Belgrano.

== Career statistics ==
=== Club ===
As of 10 August 2021.

Club	Season	League			Cup		Continental		Other		Total	
Club	Season	Division	Apps	Goals	Apps	Goals	Apps	Goals	Apps	Goals	Apps	Goals
Belgrano	2021	Primera Nacional	1	0	0	0	–		0	0	1	0
Career total			1	0	0	0	0	0	0	0	1	0
