= Ricardo Galli =

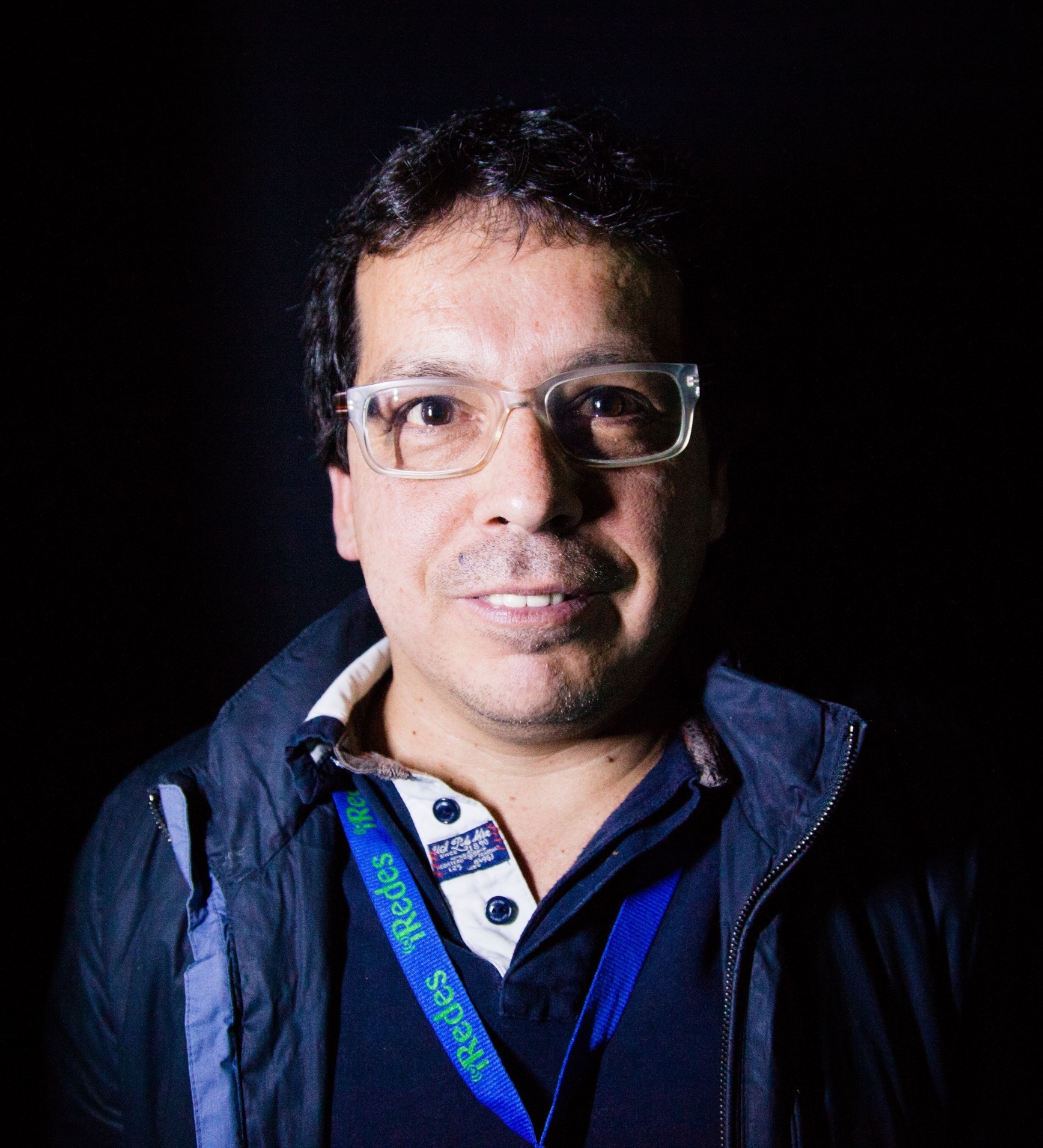
- Ricardo Galli in 2015
- Born: Ricardo Adolfo Galli Granada
- Other name: Gallir
- Occupations: informatic, teacher
- Website: Ricardo Galli

Dr. Ricardo Adolfo Galli Granada, also known as gallir, is a doctor of computer science at the University of the Balearic Islands, where he teaches operating system design. He is a speaker for the Free Software Foundation and a free software activist.

== Projects ==
As a university project, he created a system that allows controlling of the airship parking at the Son Sant Joan Airport in Palma de Mallorca, Balearic Islands, Spain.

In December 2005, he programmed Menéame, a clone of the well-known Digg Web site, which serves to promote stories published on blogs. He then released the source code of Meneame, which the source code of the open source Digg clone Pligg CMS is based on.

He programmed cpudyn, a daemon that can be used to underclock portable computers to reduce their power consumption.

He programmed wp-cache, a WordPress plugin for the purpose of caching pages to make one's blog "faster and more responsive".

In 2001, he was nominated for a Hispalinux prize. He has published over 200 technical articles in BULMA, a local Linux user Web site.
