= Chehr Gali =

- Location within Pakistan
- Coordinates: 34.1°N 73.16°E
- Country: Pakistan
- Province: Khyber Pakhtunkhwa
- District: Abbottabad District
- Elevation: 1,535 m (5,036 ft)
- Time zone: UTC+5 (PST)

Chehr is a village of Abbottabad District in the Khyber Pakhtunkhwa province of Pakistan. It is a forty minutes away from Havelian City of Abbottabad District by road and is located at 34°1'30N 73°16'10E with an altitude of 1535 metres (5039 feet). In the east of Chehr gali has Nathia Gali, on the North has Jabbri, on the South has Abbottabad City & on the Southern West has Havelian city. Hindko and the Potohari are the predominant languages of this area. Most of the local population is Karlal tribes known as Sardars, but the area also includes many other peoples, including Abbasi, Awan, & some other castes in minority. The climate in the area is warm in summers and very cold in winters. Due to the diversity of local topography and climate, particularly of rainfall, the flora varies from place to place. Tree species are well represented by the deciduous and evergreen types. The commonest broad leaved trees are walnut, asanthus, traikun, eucalyptus, acacia, chestnut, birth-cherry, yew, barmi, peshor, wild olive, ash, plane tree, alder, Persian lilac, elm, mulberry, and many species of willow, with poplar Birch and occasionally juniper found in the higher parts. Among the conifers there are pine, deodar, blue pine spruce, and silver fir. Fruit trees of the area include apple, apricot, plum, fig, pear, wild pear, mango, orange, damson, litchi, and persimmon. Low and bare hills provide a panoramic view of prairie-like widespread plains while higher ends are covered with pine trees and snow in the winter. The lack of irrigation facilities in the district has affected the productivity of the soil in spite of its fertility. Cultivation mainly depends on seasonal rainfall.
