= Rosalinda Galli =

Italian voice actress

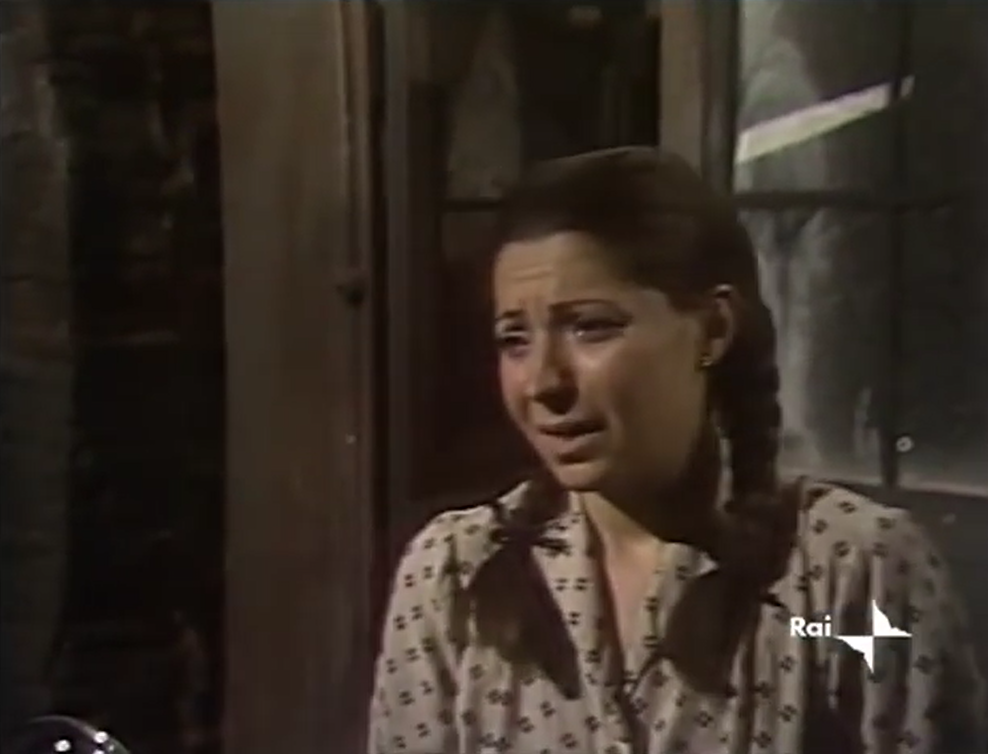
- Born: February 27, 1949 (age 76); Rome, Italy
- Occupation: voice actress

Rosalinda Galli (born February 27, 1949) is an Italian voice actress, who is part of the ADAP (Associazione Doppiatori Attori Pubblicitari - Association of cast actors advertising).

She is particularly known for being the Italian voice of Lum in the anime and manga series Urusei Yatsura, Beauty Tachibana in Invincible Steel Man Daitarn 3, and Hikaru Makiba in Grendizer.

Her other voice-over roles include the original voice of Marina in the first Italian dub of Hans Christian Andersen's The Little Mermaid, as well as other characters in Attack No. 1, Attacker You!, Candy Candy, Hana no Ko Lunlun, Ohayō! Spank, Oniisama e..., Scooby-Doo, Story of the Alps: My Annette, and The Rose of Versailles.
