= Reticular pigmented anomaly of the flexures =

- Other names: Kitamura reticulate acropigmentation
- Specialty: Dermatology

Reticular pigmented anomaly of the flexures (also known as dark dot disease and Dowling–Degos disease) is a fibrous anomaly of the flexures or bending parts of the axillae, neck and inframammary/sternal areas. It is an autosomal-dominant pigmentary disorder that may appear in adolescence or adulthood. This condition is due to mutations in structural/desmosomal proteins found within stratified squamous epithelium.

Dark dot disease is associated with KRT5.

== See also ==
- List of cutaneous conditions
- List of cutaneous conditions caused by mutations in keratins
- Skin lesion
