= Titus Bronson =

Founder of Kalamazoo, Michigan (1788–1853)

Titus Bronson (November 27, 1788 – January 6, 1853) is regarded as the founder of the city of Kalamazoo, Michigan.

He was married to Sally Bronson with whom he had issue. He did business for a time selling seed potatoes.

In 1829, Titus Bronson, originally from Connecticut, was the first settler to build a cabin within the present city limits. He obtained a U. S. land patent along with his brother-in-law Stephen R. Richardson for a portion of land near a salient bend of the Kalamazoo River within survey township 2 south, range 11 west of Kalamazoo County in Michigan Territory. From this land, he platted the village in 1831 and named it the 'Town of Bronson' (not to be confused with the much smaller Bronson, Michigan about 50 miles (80 km) to the south-southeast), although the plat recorded in the County office misspelled it 'Brunson'.

One contemporary witness described Bronson as morally upright and generous. However, Bronson was frequently described as "eccentric" and argumentative and was later run out of town. The Village of Bronson was renamed the "Village of Kalamazoo" in 1836, due in part to an incident resulting in Bronson's being fined for stealing a cherry tree. Today, a hospital and a park, among other things, are named for him. The City Hall building has an inscription honoring him.

After leaving Kalamazoo, Bronson found his way to Davenport, Iowa, where, in 1842, he lost most of his money in a land swindle. His wife also died in that same year. Bronson lived in Illinois for a short while, and then returned to Connecticut where he died a broken man. His headstone reads: "A Western Pioneer, Returned to Sleep with his Fathers."

== Sources ==
- "Titus Bronson: Founder of Kalamazoo". Kalamazoo Public Library: Local history.
- "The History of Kalamazoo MI". Living in Kalamazoo.
- "Etching 1867 Corporation Hall and a Community's Growth" (PDF). Kalamazoo Public Library.
