= Glenn Iwasaki =

Utah State Court judge

Glenn K. Iwasaki

Judge of the Third Judicial District Court, Utah
- In office July 1992 – September 30, 2011
- Appointed by: Governor Norman H. Bangerter

Personal details
- Education: J.D., University of Utah College of Law (1971)
- Profession: Attorney; Judge
- Known for: Judge in Utah; presiding in notable cases such as the Trolley Square shooting; work on court reform, racial and ethnic fairness in judiciary

Glenn K. Iwasaki is a Utah attorney. He served as State Court Judge for the Third Judicial District Court, which serves Salt Lake, Summit, and Tooele counties of Utah. He was appointed to the bench in July 1992 by Governor Norman H. Bangerter, and has served there since. He retired on September 30, 2011.

== Early life ==
Iwasaki received his JD from University of Utah College of Law in 1971. Iwasaki, whose family was held in an Idaho internment camp for people of Japanese ancestry during World War II. He was the 13th ethnic minority admitted to the Utah State Bar. He stated that he decided to become a lawyer at age 14 because he saw it as a way to help people. He was guided by his family's strong work ethic and the high expectations that his parents held for him and his siblings. Iwasaki became a lawyer and then a judge; his brother became an engineer and his sister became a nurse. “We all went to college,” Iwasaki said. “We never sat down and talked about it, but that was something that was expected of us.”

== Career ==
=== Attorney ===
During Iwasaki's legal career, he worked as both a prosecutor and criminal defense attorney, serving as a Deputy Salt Lake County Attorney, as a trial attorney for the Salt Lake Legal Defenders Association and as a partner in the law firm of Collard, Pixton, Iwasaki & Downes. During his tenure as Deputy County Attorney he served as unit chief for the Special Victims Prosecution Unit.

Iwasaki is an adjunct professor of law at the University of Utah and served on the Board of Trustees of its S.J. Quinney College of Law Alumni Association.

=== Judge ===
Iwasaki was named 2008 “Judge of the Year” by the Utah State Bar. He is a Fellow of the American Bar Foundation and a recipient of the Raymond S. Uno Award from the Utah State Bar. Iwasaki served as chair of the Youth Parole Authority, along with the Utah Task Force on Racial and Ethnic Fairness in the Judicial System. Iwasaki was a member of the Utah Supreme Court Advisory Committee on the Rules of Criminal Procedure. He served on the Committee for Improving Jury Service, as well as the KUED board. Every 6 years Court Judges stand for retention election, and in 2008 Judge Iwasaki's compliance review was exceptional. He retained over 95% approval ratings on all retention survey questions answered by attorneys and was retained in office by the Utah voters. In an article published in the Utah Bar Journal titled "What Do I Know," Judge Iwasaki offered some insight into his personality, what was important to him, and what he expected from practitioners who appear in his courtroom. He stated that behavior such as honesty, courtesy, concision, professionalism, promptness, ethics and integrity all go without saying, but one key to a successful appearance was to get his name right. The Litigation section of the Utah State Bar published a Bench Book outlining Judge Iwasaki's courtroom practices and preferences.

== Notable cases ==
Judge Iwasaki presided over many notable cases. He heard the Trolley Square shooting case in 2007, where a shooting spree resulted in the deaths of five bystanders. In a wrongful death and personal injury civil action brought by a shooting victim, Judge Iwasaki ruled that a jury would decide whether the guns sold to the gunman by a local pawn shop were sold legally. At the heart of the issue is whether the Mossberg 88 pistol-grip, 12-gauge weapon qualifies as a “shotgun.” It is illegal to sell a firearm to a person under 21, with the exception of shotguns and rifles. The weapon purchased came with a pistol grip, and plaintiffs claimed that made the sale of the gun illegal.

== Personal life ==
Glenn Iwasaki's cousin, Paul Iwasaki, serves as a juvenile court judge in the 2nd District.
