= Menéame =

Spanish social news website

Menéame Comunicacions, SL
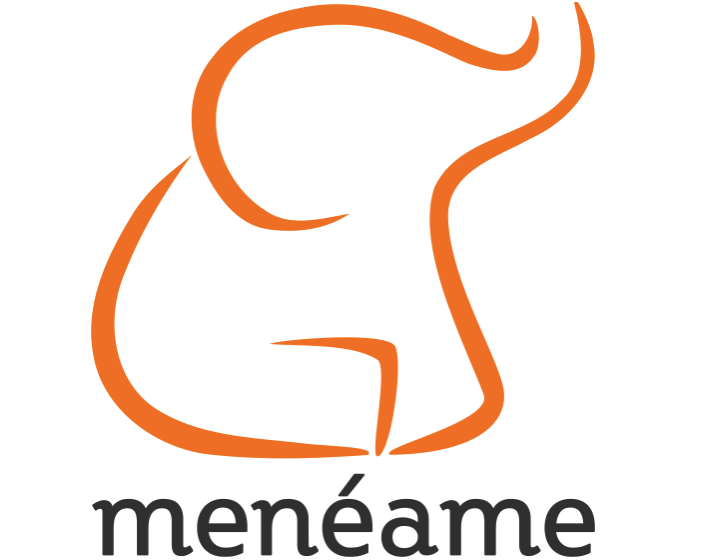
- Menéame
- Company type: Private
- Founded: Sineu, Majorca, Spain
- Founder: Ricardo Galli
- Headquarters: Sineu, Majorca, Spain
- Area served: Worldwide
- Key people: Ricardo Galli (Founder); Benjamí Villoslada
- Revenue: 87,817.4 (2024)
- Net income: −37,787.42 (2024)
- Website: meneame.net

Menéame
- License: GNU AGPL
- Repository: https://github.com/Meneame/meneame.net

Menéame is a Spanish social news website based on community participation, made for users to discover and share content on the Internet, by submitting links, which are voted and commented upon. Its model is based on Digg and it combines social bookmarking, blogging and Web syndication with a publication system without editors. In July 2019, the Alexa Internet ranking presented the site in position 6249 of the world list, and 129 of the Spanish list.

== Overview ==
Alexa internet ranked Menéame.net as Spain's 179th most popular site as of February 2016. Its name derives from the verb menear (Spanish for "to wiggle, shake or move") and means "shake me" or "move me".

In February, 2016, Ricardo Galli founder and CEO announced he was going to leave the company. In this moment, Meneame's management is taken by Remo Domingo, director of the consultant firm iAsesoría and former financial manager of Menéame in last years, and Daniel Seijo, founder of the startup investment company Civeta Investment SA. In this way, Martín Varsavsky continues being main shareholder.

The PHP software that runs menéame is FOSS under GNU Affero General Public License and is available through SVN and Git.
