= María Galli =

Swiss-Uruguayan pianist, composer and music teacher

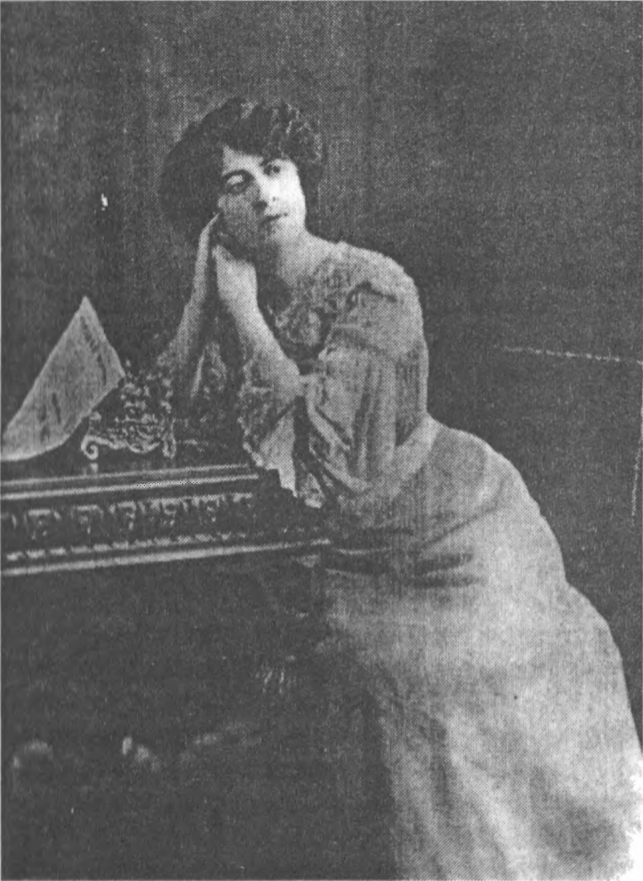
Maria Galli

María Felicia Antonia Galli Bagutti (13 June 1872 - 2 November 1960) was a Swiss-Uruguayan pianist, composer and music teacher. She was the first to approach the symphonic repertoire, the first to write an opera, a piano sonata and the first to venture into Latin American rhythms without forgetting the inclusion of tango (prohibitive for the females in her time).

== Early life and education ==
María Galli was born in Montevideo on 13 June 1872, the daughter of the Swiss Galli Agustoni and Aurora Bagutti, who were based in Uruguay. On 15 August 1872, she was baptized in the Montevideo Metropolitan Cathedral. Around 1875, her parents moved to Switzerland. There her brothers, Rafael in 1878, the twins Carlos and Luisa in 1881, and Félix in 1883 were born.

Her musical studies began in the Swiss capital at the conservatory directed by the composer, conductor and violinist Friedrich Hegar. Her composition teacher was Lothar Kempier, while on piano and organ she was instructed by Walter Lang and Lutz, respectively.

She moved to Italy, where she took an advanced course in Milan, where she was in charge of Luigi Nappelli in composition and Giuseppe Frugatta in piano. Some Italian influence can be distinguished in Galli’s romances and songs. Later, the Royal Bologna Philharmonic Academy awarded her the title of "honorary member", as well as the "magisterium of the pianist class". Besides important musical training, Galli also learned French, English, Italian and German languages. In this period prior to her return to Uruguay, she gave numerous concerts. In Lugano, her work Himno Triunfal earned her the first prize among a group of sixty composers.

== Return to Uruguay ==
Together with her family, María Galli returned to Uruguay around 1900, settling in a house located at Calle Juncal No. 135 (today No. 1395) in the Old City.

In 1902, a series of commemorations took place in honour of the Uruguayan independence hero Juan Antonio Lavalleja. In this context, a musical contest was carried out, in which María Galli was awarded for her work Marcha a Lavalleja.

== Pianist and composer ==
Conservatorio Musical de Montevideo was founded on 5 August 1904, based in the Victoria Hall Theatre. María Galli and Catalina Debernardis de Scarabelli were appointed responsible for the Piano Department.

Galli’s work for string orchestra entitled Gavota premiered in December 1904 and was conducted by Virgilio Scarabelli. Parallel to her work as a composer, she appeared on many occasions as a soloist on the piano or as a member of a trio with that instrument, along with Eduardo Fabini on violin and Avelino Baños on cello.

Her work for orchestra Lontananza premiered in 1907, and years later it was transcribed for piano. On 11 June 1912, the teacher and composer Luis Sambucetti, who conducted the National Orchestra, premiered in public Galli's compositions entitled Nórdica, Toccata and Chanson triste. The following year, Sambucetti, with the same orchestra, performed her work Marcha Nupcial at the first audition, in addition to rerunning, with great public and critical acceptance, the work Lontananza.

Galli toured several European cities from 1920, such as London, Milan, Paris and Geneva. In the latter, she received musical education at the piano school of Professor Glaubert. In Bern, within the framework of the Swiss national holiday, her works Lontanaza and Toccata were premiered on 1 August 1924, directed by Caligaris.

On 28 September 1929, the work Victoire was presented by the maestro Vicente Pablo, conducting the Uruguayan Orchestral Society. Some time later, Galli founded her own conservatory, called the "Modern Piano School", located at 1217 Colonia Street. There, the musician put into practice the education received in Europe and reflected her own teaching method for piano in a text entitled "The Piano Mentor", which remained unpublished.

== Last years ==
María Galli had no children and wrote her will on 21 May 1957, in which she left her possessions to her students María del Carmen and Luis Eduardo Garicoits, who looked after her until the day she died. María Galli died on 2 November 1960 in Montevideo.

== Works (selected) ==
- Himno Triunfal, 1899
- Marcha a Lavalleja, 1902
- Gavota, 1904
- Lontananza, 1907
- Toccata n°1, 1912
- Floreal
- Gloria
- Nórdica, 1912
- Chanson Triste, 1912
- Marcha Nupcial, 1913
- Victoire, 1929
