= James L. Gulley =

American cancer researcher

- Education: Loma Linda University, Emory University, National Cancer Institute
- Medical career
- Profession: Medical oncologist
- Institutions: National Cancer Institute
- Sub-specialties: genitourinary oncology, immunotherapy
- Research: cancer research
- Website: irp.nih.gov/pi/james-gulley

James L. Gulley is an American cancer researcher and the Director of the Medical Oncology Service at National Cancer Institute.

== Early life and education ==
He graduated from Loma Linda University, California and his M.D./Ph.D. Medical Scientist Training Program, at National Institutes of Health (NIH) and his dissertation on tumor immunology. Later, Gulley did his residency in internal medicine at Emory University in 1998, followed by a medical oncology fellowship at the NCI.

== Research and career ==
Gulley did his research in immunotherapy for prostate cancer. His studies involved the use of cancer vaccine and immune checkpoint inhibitors or other strategies to enhance vaccine-mediated killing. Since 1999, he ran clinical trials at the NCI, serving as Principal Investigator or an Associate Investigator on approximately 40 trials. He is also running studies on cancer patients.

== Publications ==
He published over 250 research papers & book chapters across leading journals. Some of his notable publications are listed below:

- Overall survival analysis of a phase II randomized controlled trial of a Poxviral-based PSA-targeted immunotherapy in metastatic castration-resistant prostate cancer
- Androgen deprivation therapy for prostate cancer
- Randomized phase II trial of docetaxel plus thalidomide in androgen-independent prostate cancer
- Combining a recombinant cancer vaccine with standard definitive radiotherapy in patients with localized prostate cancer
- Phase I study of sequential vaccinations with fowlpox-CEA (6D)-TRICOM alone and sequentially with vaccinia-CEA (6D)-TRICOM
- A randomized phase II study of concurrent docetaxel plus vaccine versus vaccine alone in metastatic androgen-independent prostate cancer.
- Immunologic and prognostic factors associated with overall survival employing a poxviral-based PSA vaccine in metastatic castrate-resistant prostate cancer
- Ipilimumab and a poxviral vaccine targeting prostate-specific antigen in metastatic castration-resistant prostate cancer: a phase 1 dose-escalation trial

== FDA approval ==
At the 2010 ASCO meeting Gulley and his group reported on the use of Ipilimumab with a vector-based vaccine for treating advanced prostate cancer. This phase I trial using PSA-TRICOM with Ipilimumab (Ipi) showed promise for Overall Survival (OS). Ipi is used in melanoma vaccine clinical trials. It was approved by the FDA in March 2011.

== Awards ==
- He received Presidential Early Career Award for Science and Engineering “For randomized, controlled studies using novel, recombinant vaccines to reduce the progression of prostate and other cancers and increase survival.”
- He received Federal Laboratory Consortium Excellence in Federal Technology Transfer Award, a national award for “Development of first immunotherapy to treat chordoma, a rare bone cancer.”
