= Alfred Gurdon Gulley =

American horticulturist and educator (1848-1917)

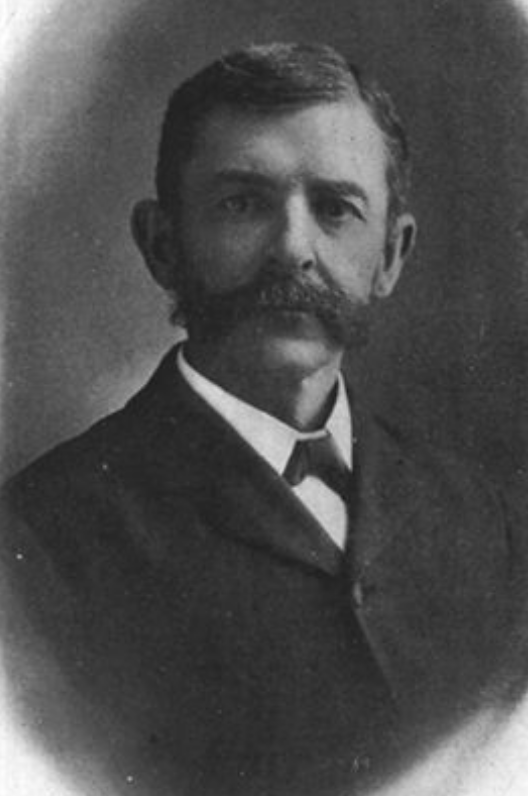
- Born: July 15, 1848; Dearborn, Michigan, US
- Died: August 16, 1917 (aged 69); South Windsor, Connecticut
- Education: Michigan State University (B.S., M.S.)
- Scientific career
- Fields: Horticulture
- Workplaces: University of Connecticut

Alfred Gurdon Gulley (July 15, 1848 — August 16, 1917) was an American professor of horticulture at the Connecticut Agricultural College (now the University of Connecticut) from 1894 to 1917. He oversaw the beautification of the grounds, planting many ornamental trees and gardens.

== Early life and education ==
Gulley was born into a farming family in Dearborn, Michigan, on July 15, 1848. He earned his Bachelor of Science degree from Michigan State Agricultural College (now Michigan State University) in 1868 and his Master of Science degree in 1873. He was one of the first graduates from one of the first agricultural colleges in the United States. Both his degrees were in horticulture. He specialized in fruit farming and ornamentals.

== Career ==
After graduation, Gulley worked in greenhouses and nurseries in Detroit, Rochester, and South Haven for the better part of two decades. He worked as assistant horticulturist at Michigan State from 1890 to 1893 and then taught at the University of Vermont for one year. In the summer of 1894, he began his 23 years of service at the University of Connecticut as professor of horticulture. He was a skilled practical horticulturist and respected teacher, but not a scholar. Gulley served for two years as president of the Connecticut Pomological Society. He was active in promoting Connecticut's fruit growing interests and frequently lectured at gatherings of state farmers. He was an active Freemason.

== Gulley Hall ==
First occupied in 1909, the Horticulture Hall on UConn's Storrs campus was renamed Alfred Gurdon Gulley Hall in Gulley's honor in February 1921. Originally used for storage and classroom and office space, Gulley eventually became an administrative office building. Since the presidency of Homer D. Babbidge Jr. in the 1960s, Gulley Hall has housed the offices of the university president and provost.

== Death ==
Gulley died suddenly at his son's fruit farm in South Windsor, Connecticut, which he and his wife were visiting. He died on August 16, 1917, at the age of 69. He was survived by his wife and son, Roy C. Gulley. Following a funeral in Storrs, his body was returned to Michigan for interment.
