= Pierre-Paul Yale =

Canadian psychiatrist and professor (born 1948)

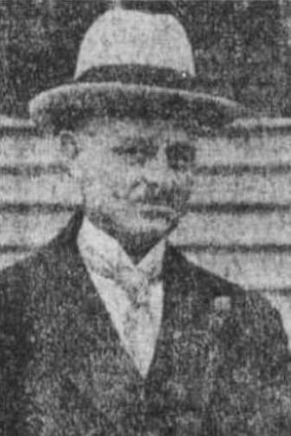
- Portrait of Dr. Pierre-Paul Yale's grandfather, August Yale
- Born: 10 March 1948; Town of Mount Royal, Quebec
- Education: Polytechnique Montreal; Sherbrooke University; McGill University
- Occupations: engineer, psychiatrist, researcher, professor
- Spouse: Carole Grenier
- Children: 2
- Family: Yale

Pierre-Paul Yale (born March 10, 1948) is a psychiatrist and ex-vice-president of the Association des médecins psychiatres du Québec. He was the expert member representing the association on a committee on mental health for the Premier of Quebec, Philippe Couillard, involving the Ministry of Health and Social Services. He was professor in psychiatry at Sherbrooke University, and published various works on psychiatry.

Notably, he was the Canadian deleguate of the American Psychiatric Association, and was made a Fellow of the association, receiving his fellowship in San Francisco, California.

== Early life ==
Pierre-Paul Yale was born on March 10, 1948, to Denise Goulet and Wilfrid Yale, son of August Yale, members of the Yale family. His grandfather August was the cousin of politician Arthur Yale, and fur merchant William Yale, a pioneer of Mont-Laurier, Quebec. Yale's father, Wilfrid Yale, resident of Mont-Royal, was a professor and director of special works at École d'arts et métiers of Montreal, and later, professor and director of the civil engineering department at Collège Ahuntsic, named Institut de Technologie Laval. He received awards from the Lt. Gov of Quebec, Esioff-Léon Patenaude, for his artistic works.

Members of his family included André Rousseau, Minister of Commerce and President of Quebec Liberal Party, Jacques Rousseau, cofounder of Montreal Botanical Garden and professor at Sorbonne University in Paris, and François Rousseau, chief-engineer of Hydro Quebec, MIT graduate and cofounder of Groupe RSW with SNC Lavalin President, Guy Saint-Pierre. Other in-laws included Marc Rousseau, President of Decalcomania in Plateau-Mount Royal, Claude Rousseau, industrialist of Montmagny, Quebec, Thomas Rousseau, Père Blanc in Africa, George Rousseau, lawyer, Alfred A. Goulet, alderman of the city of Montreal, and Dr. Marie Rousseau and Dr. Georges Reinhardt.

Yale's godmother was Dame Claire Yale, heiress of the Yale Islands and daughter of Arthur Yale of Côte-des-Neiges, while his cousin, British artist John Yale, was an aviation painter who exposed his works at the Royal Society of British Artists in London, England, working for Air Vice Marshal Peter A. Latham, and Air Marshal Sir Harold Maguire. Yale was also a third cousin of Montreal lawyer Jacob Yale Fortier.

== Education ==
Pierre-Paul Yale attended St-Clement School in Mount-Royal during his youth, then attended College de St-Laurent from 1960 to 1968. He continued his studies at the University of Montreal, then went to Polytechnique Montreal, graduating as an engineer in 1972. He continued his studies and began his medical program at Sherbrooke University from 1972 to 1976. He then entered psychiatry as a specialty at Sherbrooke University from 1976to 1979, and thereafter, went to McGill University to complete his studies, graduating as a psychiatrist in 1980.

== Career ==
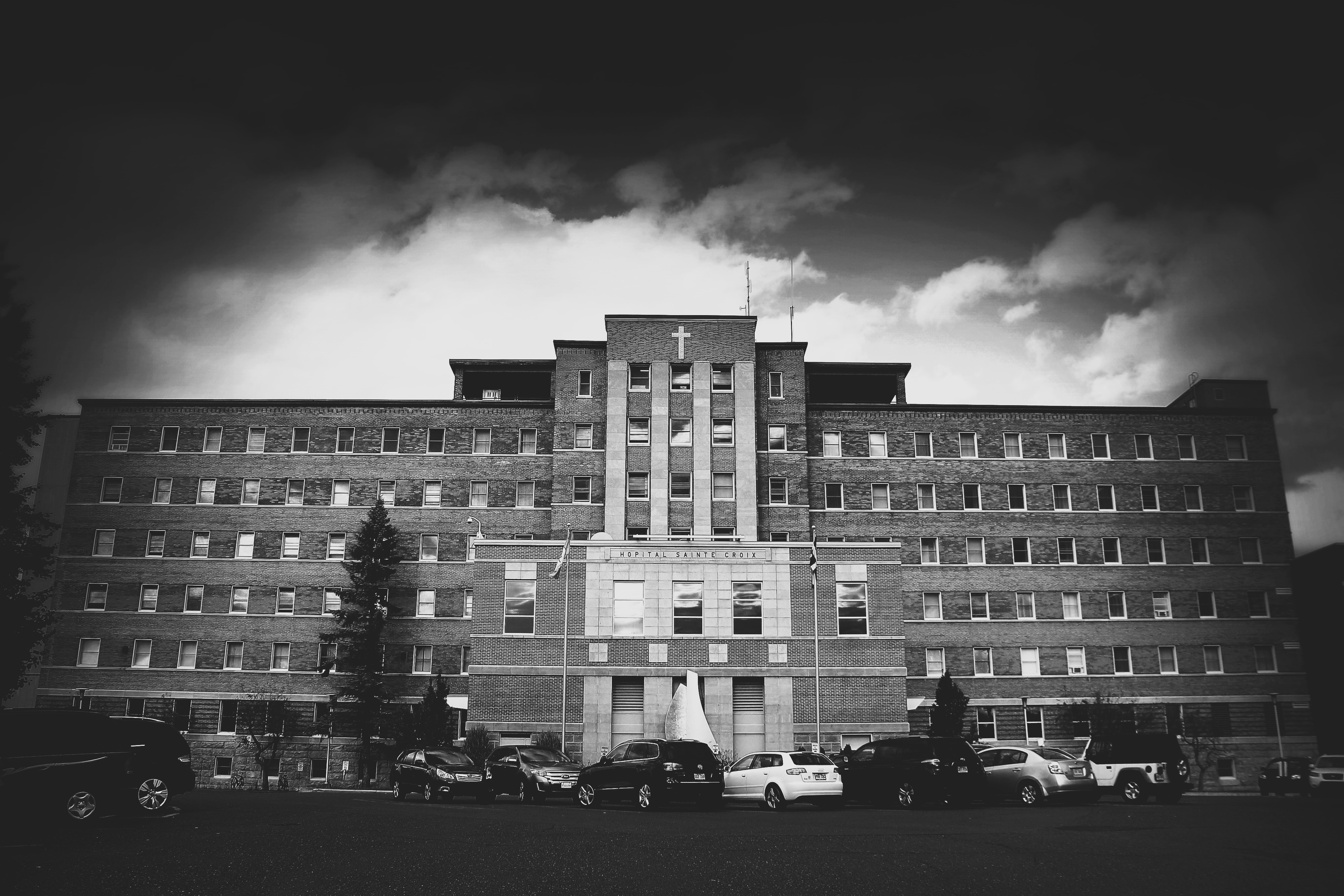
Sainte-Croix Hospital in Drummondville, Quebec, where Dr. Yale was director of their psychiatry department

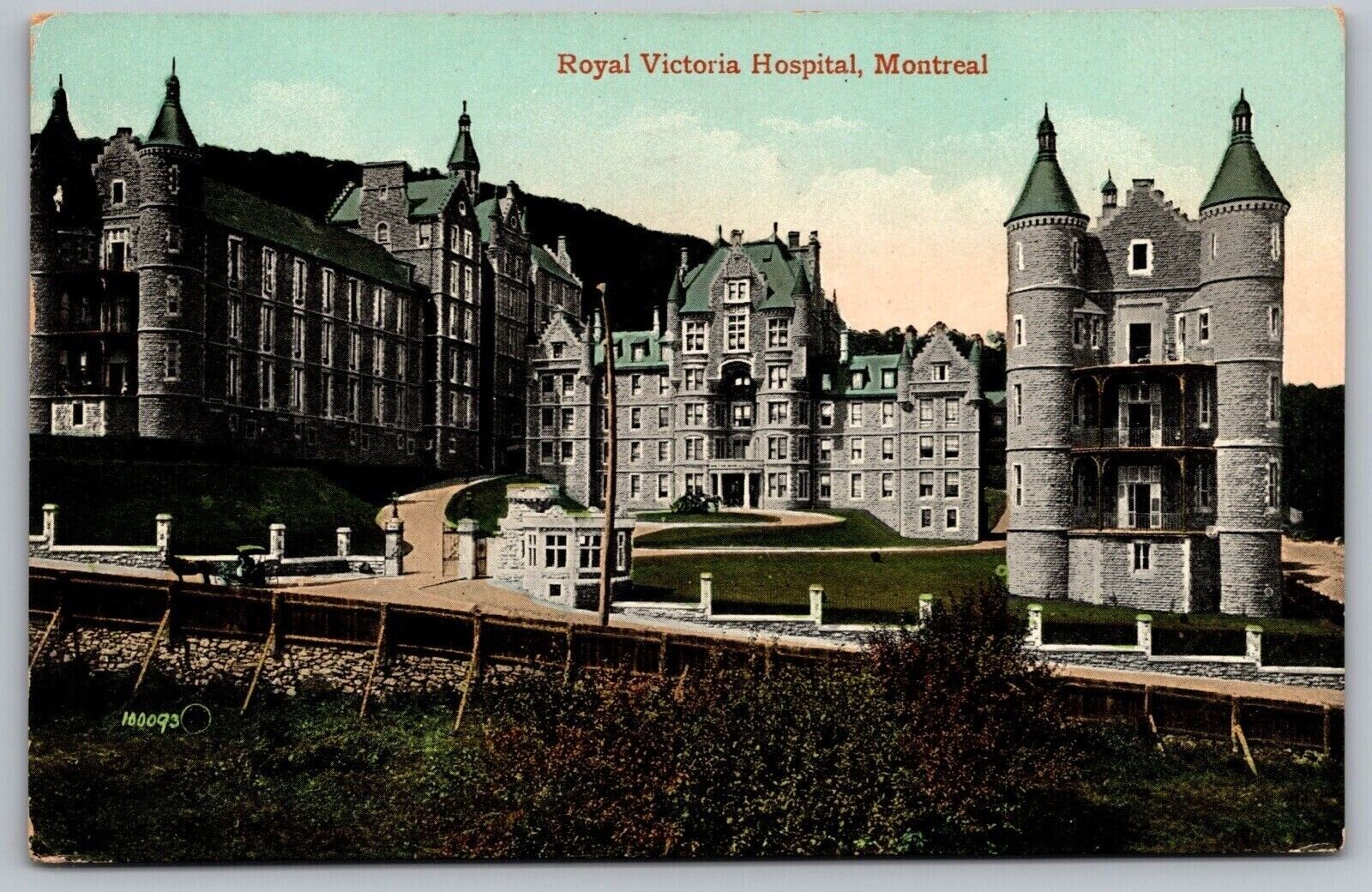
Old Royal Victoria Hospital, Montreal, where Dr. Yale's brother, Dr. Jean-Francois Yale, was director of endocrinology

Pierre-Paul Yale began his career as a clinical psychiatrist at the Sainte-Croix Hospital in the Town of Drummondville, Québec, from 1980 to 1991 and during that period, he also taught at Sherbrooke University in the psychiatry department. Before the start of his clinical career, he was the representative of the residents of the Association of Psychiatrists of Canada from 1977 to 1978, and was elected a board director of the association in 1979. He also became the Canadian Deleguate of the American Psychiatric Association in 1980, then member of the committee of the research centre of Louis-H Lafontaine Hospital in 1982. During that period, he continued his career as a psychiatrist at Ste-Croix Hospital in Drummondville, Quebec, from 1980 to 1990 and in 1989, he was named director of their psychiatry department.

Since 1980, he had been professor at the department of psychiatry of Sherbrooke University, and later, vice-president of Informatique Medicale Corporation, and vice-president of Societe Miniere Uniquartz Corporation. From 1982 to 1983, he was board director of the Ste-Croix Foundation. He wrote various publications on management systems, therapy treatments and medical education in relation to psychiatry.

In 1983, Yale began a part-time practice at Ste-Therese Hospital of Shawinigan and conceived a software management product that was sold by his enterprise to the hospital for $$160,000, as he was previously an engineer before graduating. This amount included all ownership and future revenues for the Ste-Therese Hospital Yale's medical software allowed the digital management of the medical files of each patients; a model which would later be implemented by other companies in the healthcare industry. The contract was later the subject of an enquiry by Senator Thérèse Lavoie-Roux, at the time Minister of Health and Social Services under Premier Robert Bourassa.

The investigating commissioner found no irregularities on Yale's part and was fully exonerated, as his software was an innovation and caused misunderstandings by journalists. Yale was named the vice-presidency of Purkinje Inc and Développement Purkinje Inc, which were, at the time, expanding their medical software offerings to international markets.

Yale continued his scientific work in 1991 with the Purkinje software company to help them implement their software to clinics and other hospitals, completely replacing paper files with software management tools. He left Purkinje in 2001 and continued his full time work as a psychiatrist in the psychiatry department of CSSS Haut-Richelieu Rouville Hospital, and in 2010 he was named board director and co-chief of psychiatry for CISSS de la Montérégie-Centre until 2018. He retired as a psychiatrist in April 2022.

== Later career ==
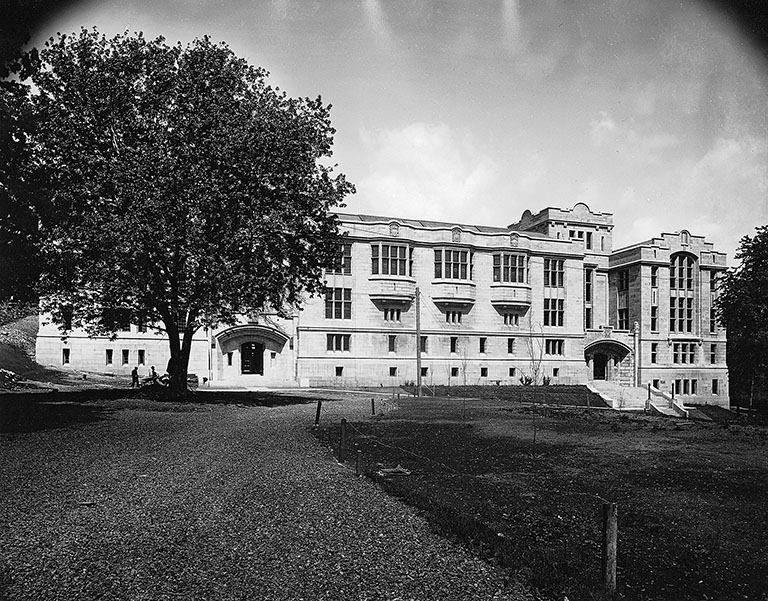
Medical Building, McGill University, Pine Avenue, Montreal, 1911

Yale was vice-president of the Association des médecins psychiatres du Québec under President Yves Lamontagne, later President of the Collège des médecins du Québec. The association has a membership of about 1,200 psychiatrists, and is affiliated with the Fédération des médecins spécialistes du Québec. Yale was involved with mental health services programs with Quebec government, and criticized the government's reorganization plan regarding its management of mental health services, citing issues with its speed of execution, and signed an open letter with 200 experts to bring awareness to the issue.

In 1993, Yale became a Fellow of the American Psychiatric Association, and received his fellowship in San Francisco, California, on May of the same year. In 2004, Dr. Pierre-Paul Yale represented the Association des médecins psychiatres du Québec on the Experts Committee of the Ministry of Health and Social Services, to be presented to the Premier of Quebec, Philippe Couillard. The committee was involved in advising the government in relation to the organization of mental health services by the Ministry, such as suicide prevention.

Yale married to Carole Grenier, daughter of Dorilas Grenier and Marie-Anna Dodier, on June 14, 1975. They became the parents of two daughters, Caroline and Melina Yale. He divorced in 1997 and married Diane Legault a few years later. Dr. Yale was also a member of the Association des psychiatre du Québec, of the Association des psychiatres du Canada, of the American Psychiatric Association, and of the Association des medecins de la langue francaise du Canada. His sister Carole Yale is a lawyer and his brother, Dr. Jean-Francois Yale, is an endocrinologist, professor of medicine at McGill University and director of the Metabolic Day Center at Royal Victoria Hospital in Montreal.

Throughout his career, his brother Jean-Francois became president and Chairman of the Clinical and Scientific department of the Canadian Diabetes Association, President and Chairman of the Expert Committee, member of the Steering Committee with the CDA, and published about 250 publications as a senior researcher. He is board director of Diagnos, an AI medical software company using big data, listed on the Toronto Stock Exchange. Yale is also a public speaker, senior research scientist, lead researcher, professor of endocrinology at McGill University, and department award recipient by Rector Yves Martin.
