= Arthur Yale =

Politician from Montreal

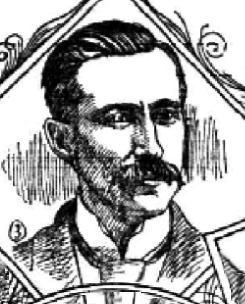
- Born: 18 November 1860; Saint-Didace, Quebec, Canada
- Died: 6 March 1917 (aged 56–57); Côte-des-Neiges, Montreal
- Occupations: politician, real estate investor, banker, mining investor
- Spouse: Elizabeth Lacombe
- Children: 4
- Family: Yale

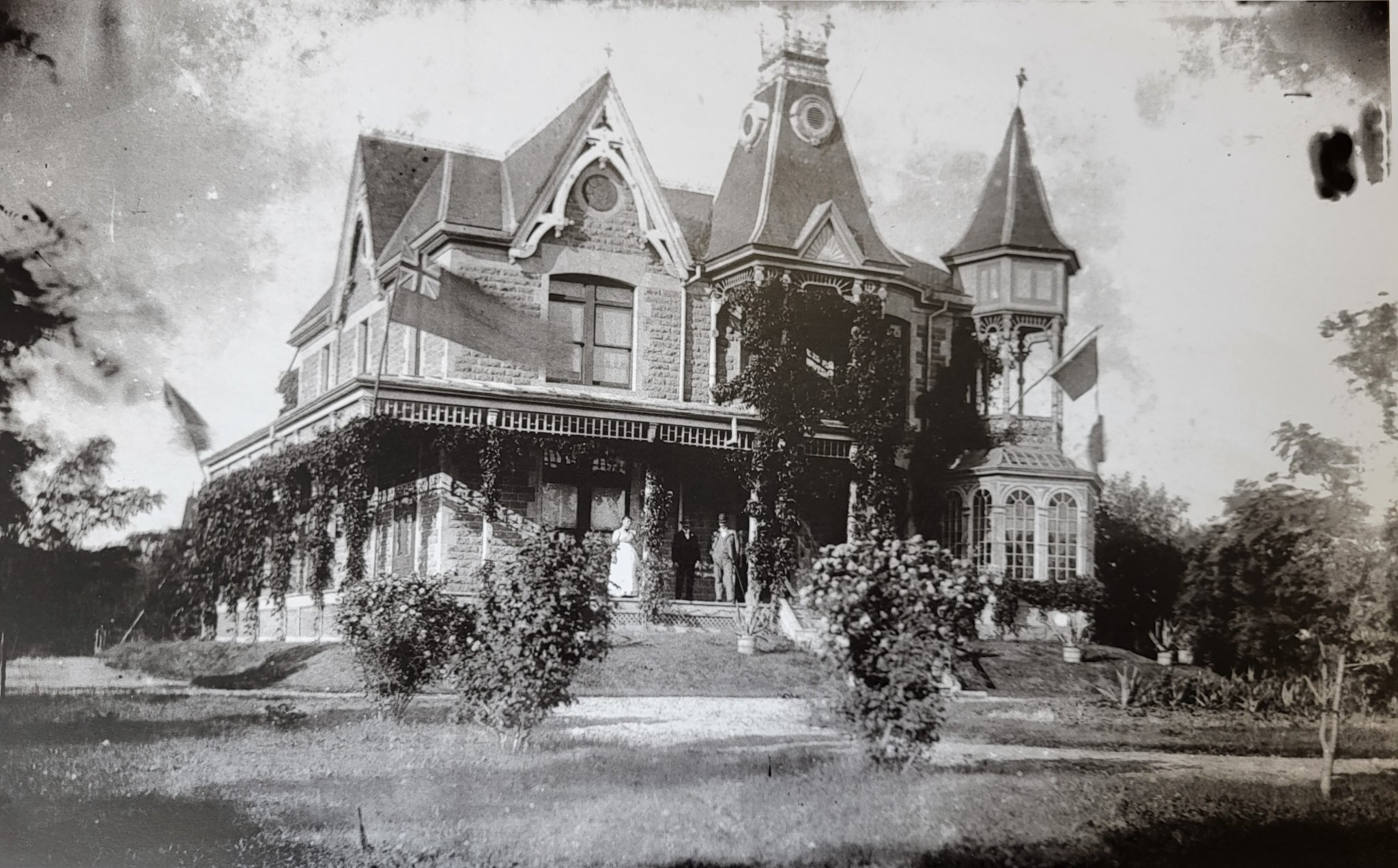
Chateau Lacombe, Cote-des-Neiges Road, property of Elizabeth Lacombe's family, wife of Arthur Yale

Denis Robert Arthur Yale (November 11, 1860 – March 6, 1917) was a Canadian politician and businessman, who became one of the founders of Plateau-Mount Royal in Montreal. He was DeLorimier's first Secretary-Treasurer and became Alderman of the town of Cote-des-Neiges. He also acquired and gave his name to the Yale Islands on Rivière des Mille Îles, Saint-Eustache, located about 20 miles from downtown Montreal. Through most of his career, he was involved in banking and mining ventures.

== Early life ==
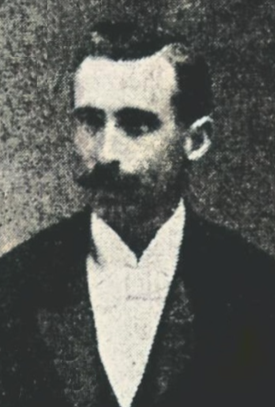
Arthur Yale, 1910, Cote-des-Neiges in Montreal, city elections

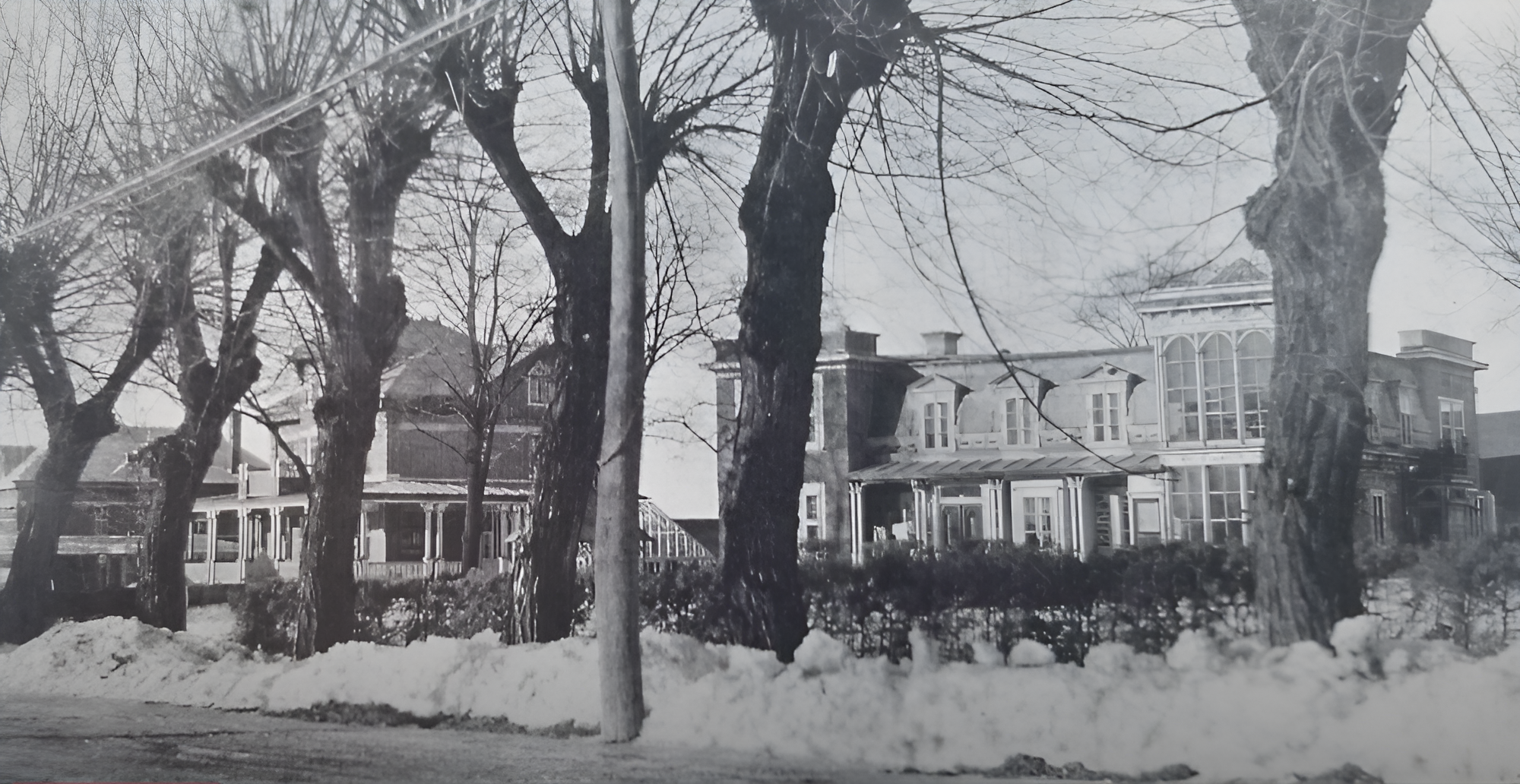
Home of Claire Yale Desmarchais on the right, a relative of Arthur Yale in Cote-des-Neiges

Arthur Yale was born in Saint-Didace, Quebec, Canada, on November 18, 1860, the son of fur merchant Edward William Yale and Sophie St-George, members of the Yale family. The Yales were notables as early benefactors of Yale University and founders of the Yale Lock Company. Arthur was the grandnephew of chief trader James Murray Yale of the Hudson's Bay Company, and his cousin, Isabella Yale, was the daughter-in-law of Gov. Sir George Simpson, the de facto Viceroy of Prince Rupert's Land, and resident of Montreal's Golden Square Mile. Another cousin, Eliza Yale, married Capt. Henry Newsham Peers, grandson of Count Julianus Petrus de Linnée, member of a noble family of France.

His father was in the fur business along with his brothers, including Arthur's uncle, Major George Henry Yale, 1st mayor of Louiseville. Maj. Yale was a wealthy manufacturer, proprietor of 3 fur factories, two sawmills, a flour mill, a watermill, a cheese factory, a shoe factory, and also owned a village named Yaletown with its 14 homes and commercial buildings. He had acquired Yaletown from Lord Samuel Gerrard, 2nd President of the Bank of Montreal, and would eventually become the second pioneer tanner in his specialty in Canada. One of Arthur's brothers, Peter Henry Yale, was in the fur trade in Massachusetts, and became the father of Dr. Henry Yale, while one of his nephews, Alfred Cinq-mars, became a lawyer in Outremont and brother of King's Counsel Alexandre Cinq-mars.

His two other brothers were Capt. George Yale, chief-engineer of the Harbor Commission of the Port of Montreal, and William Yale, fur merchant and hide dealer. William Yale, a resident of Saint-Lin, became one of the pioneers of Mont-Laurier in 1897, named after another St-Lin resident at the time, Sir Wilfrid Laurier, 1st French Canadian Prime Minister of Canada. He was the namesake of William Yale Road in Mont-Laurier, named after his former waterfront estate. The Yales were large landowners in the region and eventually founded one of the first campings in the Laurentides, including a marina and other enterprises.

Arthur Yale and his brothers were the nephews of Dr. Francois Desmarchais and Rev. Desmarchais, relatives of Cote-des-Neiges mayor, Ferdinand Desmarchais, and of the Lacombe family, who together, were the largest landowners in Cote-des-Neiges, with about 11 estates in 1879. Territories of Cote-des-Neiges eventually became part of Westmount, Outremont, Mount-Royal and Notre-Dame-de-Grâce. They were also the relatives, through the Desmarchais, of Judge Philémon Cousineau, mayor of St-Laurent and President of the Mount Royal Telephone Company.

== Biography ==
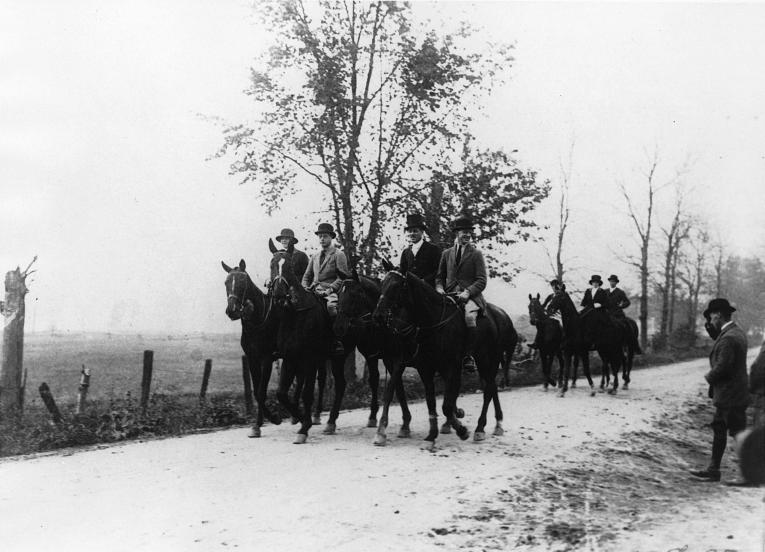
The Prince of Wales, Edward, Duke of Windsor, riding with the Montreal Hunt Club in 1923, in Cote-des-Neiges

Arthur Yale started his career working in the meat industry, first as a tallow merchant in the East End abbatoir, then as superintendent. He was also a clerk and an accountant. The abbatoir had been cofounded by his uncle, industrialist George Henry Yale, along with Honoré Beaugrand, the future mayor of Montreal, and other investors. Yale then became a member of the Union des Abbatoires of Montreal, launched in 1884 by Ferdinand Bayard, a brick manufacturer and his future partner. The union was formed to prevent the formation of a monopoly in the meat industry, and was conceived to protect the interests of number of merchants and manufacturers. Yale would later become the Union's Secretary and be a manager of other slaughterhouses.

By 1892, at 32 years of age, he founded with Bayard and three others the North America Mining Company, with a capital stock of $200,000, or about 300 million dollars in 2024 money in relation to GDP. He was made the company's Secretary and was elected among its board directors, with Guillaume-Narcisse Ducharme as president. Ducharme was the head of Banque Jacques-Quartier at the time, and later, he would become the president of the Provincial Bank of Canada, where Yale would be one of the bank's largest shareholders.

The Provincial bank, formerly seated in Place d'Armes Square at Aldred Building's site, would merge to form the National Bank of Canada. Notable shareholders with Yale in the charter of 1900 included Senator Sir Alexandre Lacoste, Outremont founder Louis Beaubien, Judge Louis-Philippe Pelletier, Governors Narcisse Pérodeau, Sir Louis-Amable Jetté, and Montreal Mayors and Senators Sir William H. Hingston, Charles Wilson and Alphonse Desjardins.

The North America Mining Co. would also be known as the North Mica Mining Co., and had its first office on St-François-Xavier Street in Old Montreal, close to the Old Montreal Stock Exchange. The company was dealing in mines, and had discovered a mica vein at Saint-Hippolyte, Quebec, in Terrebonne county. They later moved their offices to Little Burgundy, close to Griffintown. A few years later, manufacturers were expanding their operations in Montreal on the east side of Mount-Royal, creating a growing demand for a city adapted to their needs. With the advances in technologies, especially electricity, manufacturers didn't need to stay around the St-Lawrence river, and could locate their factories closer to their customers, lowering their cost of distribution.

When came the time to incorporate the growing village known as DeLorimier, the town would elect Yale on January 12, 1895, as its first Secretary-Treasurer, being in charge of financial transactions such as raising capital through bond offerings. This village, combined with 3 other founding villages, would later be known as Plateau-Mount Royal, with DeLorimier as its electoral district. Once elected, he passed a resolution with Mayor Chabot to prevent the erection of a contagious diseases hospital within the limit of the municipality, with the intention to make the new municipality a model one. In 1897, he attended the banquet of orator Edouard D. Roy at the Hotel Richelieu, Old Montreal, along with various mayors, doctors and industrialists.

In 1898, Arthur Yale and Treffle Dubreuil founded a wholesale meat dealer enterprise named the North Western Live Stock Company. Yale's partner, Dubreuil, was an associate of banker Philorum Bonhomme on Saint Jacques Street, the cofounder of the first French-Canadian insurance company named 'La Sauvegarde'; an enterprise he cofounded with politician Henri Bourassa, Senator Raoul Dandurand, Montreal mayor Sir Hormidas Laporte, and Provincial bank president Guillaume-Narcisse Ducharme. Starting from 1898, Yale was involved in number of real estate projects, and acquired and sold real estate in DeLorimier and Plateau-Mount Royal. He is recorded acquiring land and homes near Côte-Sainte-Catherine Road in Mount Royal and in Westmount, next to the future Dawson College. He acquired real estate in Cote-des-Neiges from the Desmarchais and Lacombe families, and was involved with Simon Lacombe's succession, a relative.

== Later career ==
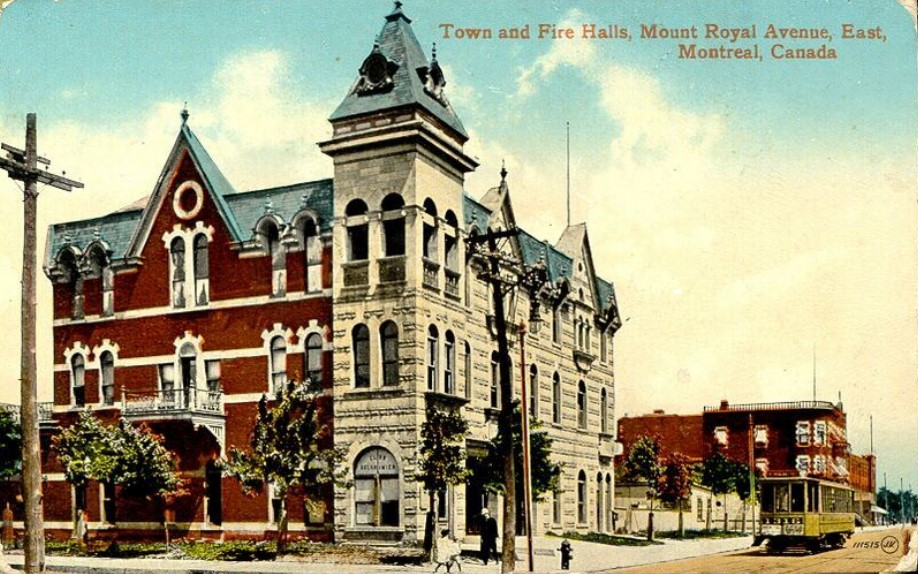
City town hall, town of DeLorimier, Mount Royal Avenue, 1901, now Plateau-Mount Royal

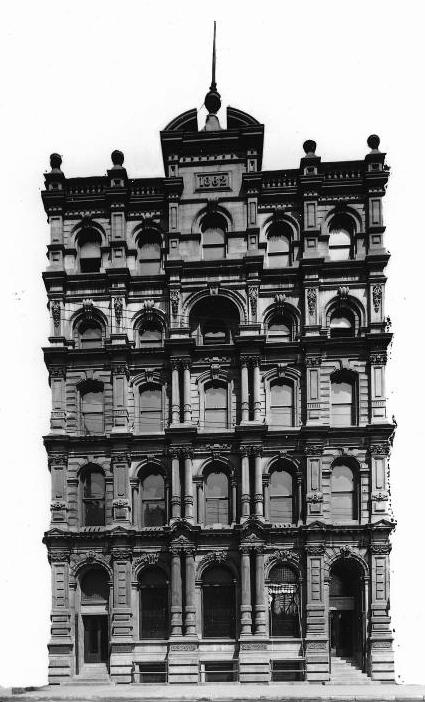
Provincial Bank of Canada, in Old Montreal, 1910, now National Bank of Canada, was in Place d'Armes at Aldred Building's site

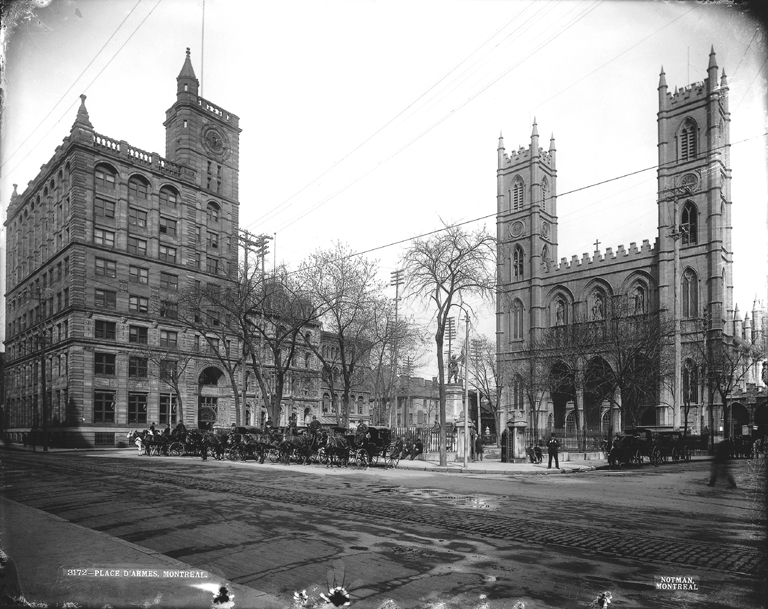
Provincial Bank of Canada in Place d'Armes on the left, between Quebec Bank Building and Notre-Dame Basilica, Montreal, about 1895

As Secretary-Treasurer of DeLorimier, he is recorded getting the approval for city loans to start various public works to meet the increasing growth of the city, including drains, paving streets and laying water pipes on Mount Royal Avenue, as well as building a bridge on Iberville street under the crossing of the Canadian Pacific Railway. In 1899, Yale is taking legal action against Ferdinand Bayard, Alderman of DeLorimier, on accusations of corruption and bribery with the Imperial Bank of Canada, hoping to have him removed from the city council.

In 1901, Yale was made the representative of the Provident Trust and Investment Co., one of the foremost financial institutions at the time, dealing in real estate and mortgages, with a capital stock of $500,000 and Alphonse Desjardins, mayor of Montreal, as first board director. During his public office at DeLorimier, he was involved in inviting the manufacturers to establish themselves in the city, in exchange for tax reductions, fostering economic growth to the area.

In 1904, Yale attended the funerals of politician Joseph Brunet with his brother, Capt. George Yale, and other members. His brother became the mechanical superintendent of the Harbour Commissioners (Port of Montreal). Capt. Yale was an attendee at the banquet of the Montreal Club as well as of the first annual dinner of the Montreal Harbor Commissioners, along with Lt. Col. George Washington Stephens Jr., member of the League of Nations, Colonel William P. Anderson, Louis de Gaspé Beaubien, Manuel Carneiro de Sousa Bandeira, prussian Franz Coels von der Brügghen, and other consul generals and colonels.

In 1909, Yale is involved in a lawsuit with Dr. Adelard Lebel of Lorimier. Yale is elected Alderman of the city of Cote-des-Neiges in 1910 by the Citizens Association of Montreal. When Cote-des-Neiges was annexed by the city of Montreal, he lost the elections to A. B. Deguire, with the Aldermen now working from Montreal City Hall at Place Jacques-Cartier. Following his defeat, he accused his adversary of being dishonest, as Deguire was not a resident of Cote-des-Neiges and his father had been the ex-mayor. On a debate, Deguire was trying to take credit from Yale's work as alderman of the city, such as his aqueduct project and other developments for the greater good of Montreal.

Yale wasn't favorable to the annextion of Cote-des-Neiges to the city of Montreal, and after their failed promises, he and other businessmen launched a petition to have Montreal deliver on their projects, such as bringing the railroad, which would pass on Yale's estate. He also accused Deguire of using his wealth and connections to get elected. Yale lived at Cote-des-Neiges, where he had a farm and residence. At the time, the city was a neighborhood of the French-Canadian bourgeoisie, and the location of the prestigious Montreal Hunt Club. A notable resident of Cote-des-Neiges among others included John Molson Jr., founder of the Molson Bank, and son of John Molson, patriarch of the Molson family.

== Yale Islands ==
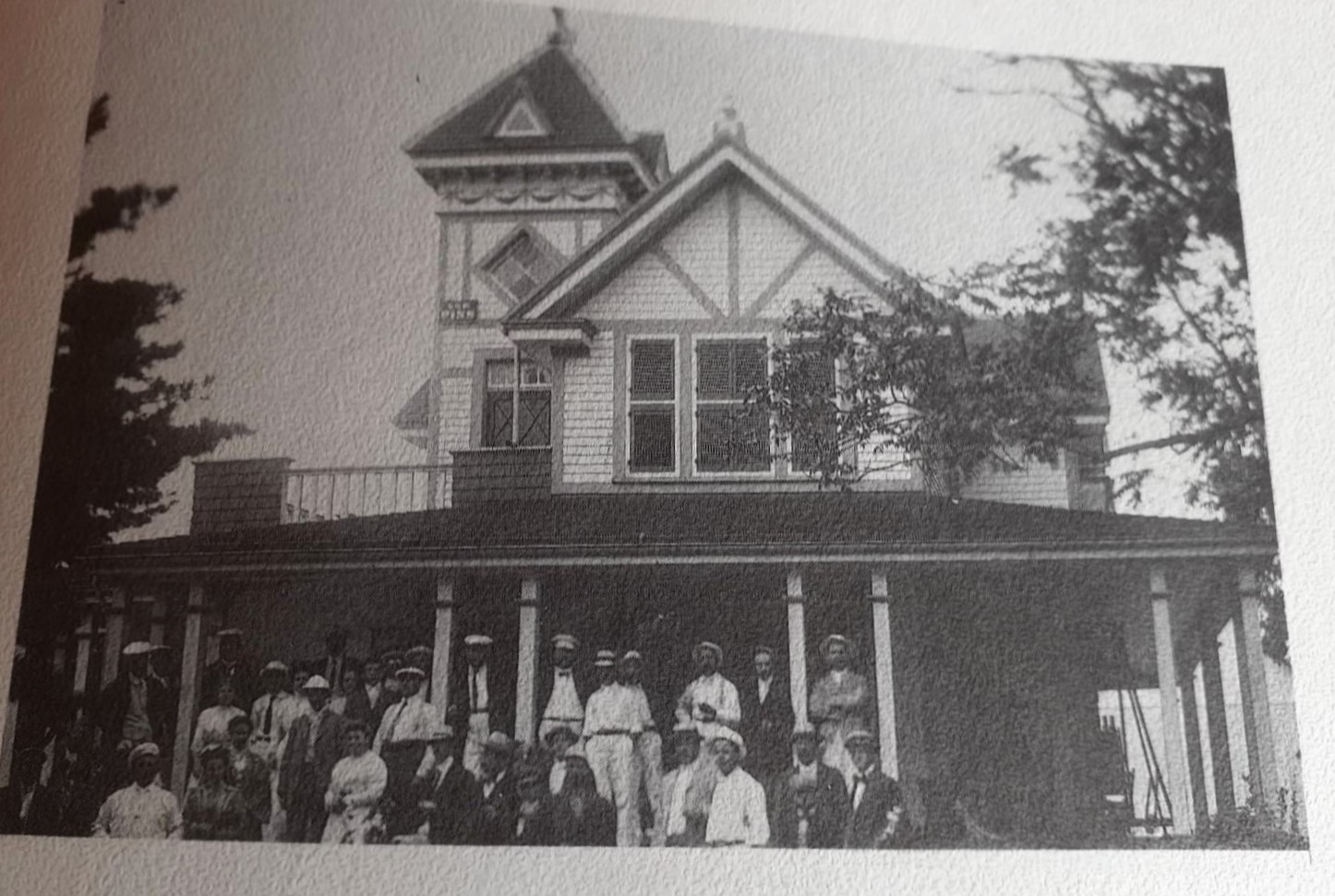
Side view of the original manor, c. 1905. Burned down c. 1955

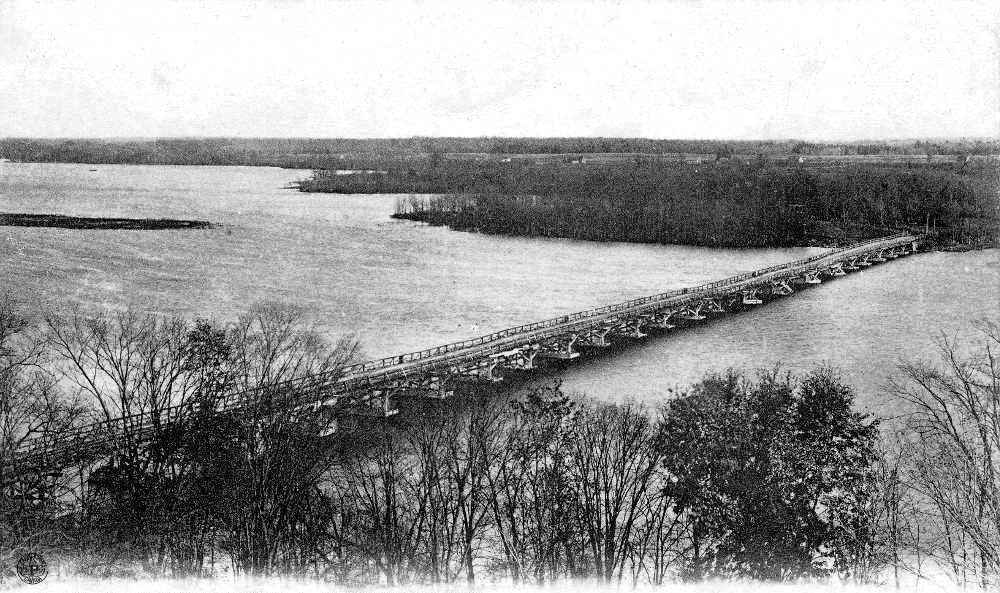
Bridge on the Rivière des Mille Îles - Saint-Eustache, close to the islands

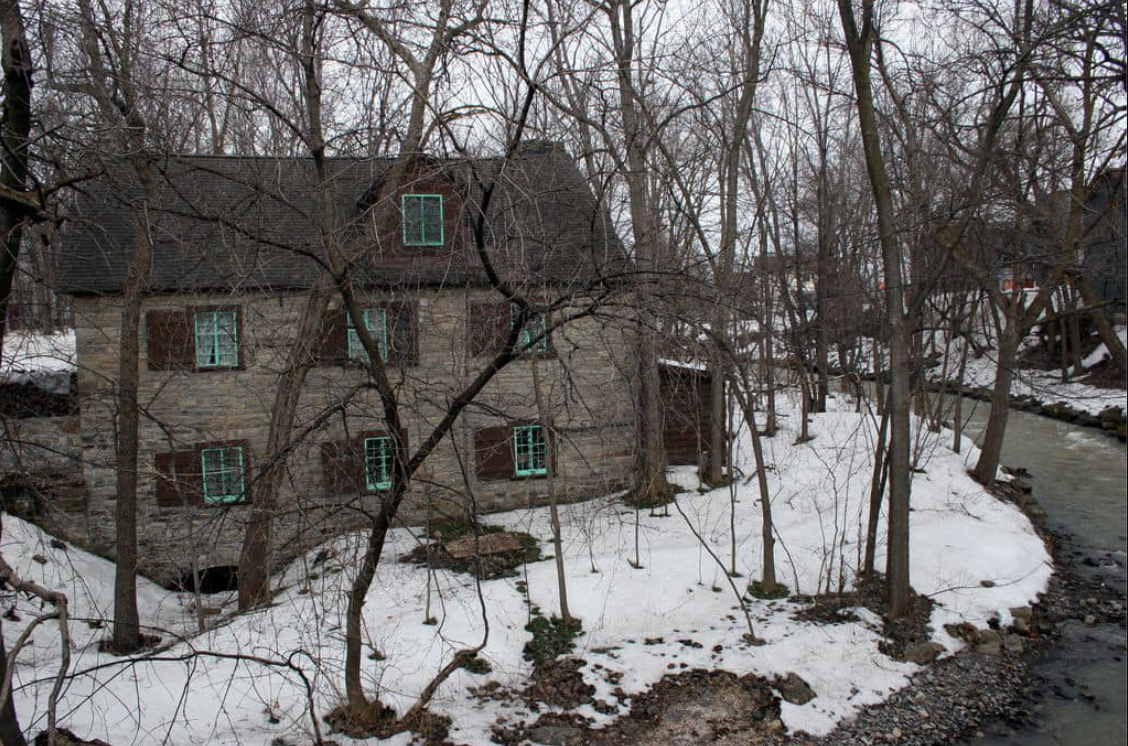
Mill of the Lord of Riviere-du-Chene, Arthur Yale acquired it in 1912

Arthur Yale, bourgeois and gentilhomme, became the proprietor of the Yale Islands, St-Eustache, in 1905, which consisted of two islands of about 15 acres each, historically part of a larger estate. The first island is named Yale Island, and the second is named Yale Islands Estate, later renamed Norbert-Aube Island by a real estate developer.

Yale acquired the mill "Moulin de la Dalle" near the estate around 1912 from Dr. Constant Loiseau, a mill that initially belonged to Eustache Lambert-Dumont, Lord of Milles-Iles. The mill was later converted into a residence. Arthur Yale's original manor was built on the island around 1905, and would be burn down 50 years later by criminals, along with another house on the property, both belonging to his daughter Claire Yale at the time. The first home was furnished by furnitures imported from Europe, such as a hand sculpted German piano, and with various European paintings, which had been transmitted in their family for generations.

The second home was rented to Dr. Paul Robin. Claire Yale's manor on the island, which was extended over time, featured an indoor pool, 5 garages, 4 fireplaces, a servant or guest house, and other facilities. They eventually received authorisations from the government to build the two bridges needed to link the two islands by car. Claire and Wilfrid Yale sold the mill around 1941 to Westmount architect Harold. E. Devitt, proprietor of Iron Cat Co., interior designers for Baron Hugh Graham, Maison Alcan and Upper Westmount clients.

With the industrialisation of Montreal over the generations, the islands stopped being completely used as a secluded private summer retreat, and started to evolve to meet the growing demand in waterfront properties. The first island would be developed with about 10 luxury waterfront homes and 100 condominiums under real estate developer Michel St-Jacques. The Yale Island Estate would stay private, with a private bridge and a manorial residence. An hostel would eventually be added and developed into a spa with large heated pools. This island was sold in 2016 to a Chinese consortium for $12,000,000, with plans to add 300 luxury condominiums. They are still known locally as the Yale Islands, and the street kept the name of Yale Islands Road.

The Yale Islands are located about 3 miles from Celine Dion's island named "Gagnon Island", and are about 20 minutes from Downtown Montreal by car. Yale's brother-in-law, Alderman Joseph Lacombe, brother of Simon Lacombe, would also become the owner of the neighboring island, and name it the Joseph-Lacombe Island. These were the Lacombes who became the namesake of Lacombe Avenue in Cote-des-Neiges, named after their estates. The avenue features St. Mary's Hospital, and is next to College Notre-dame and College Jean-de-Brebeuf.

== Personal life ==
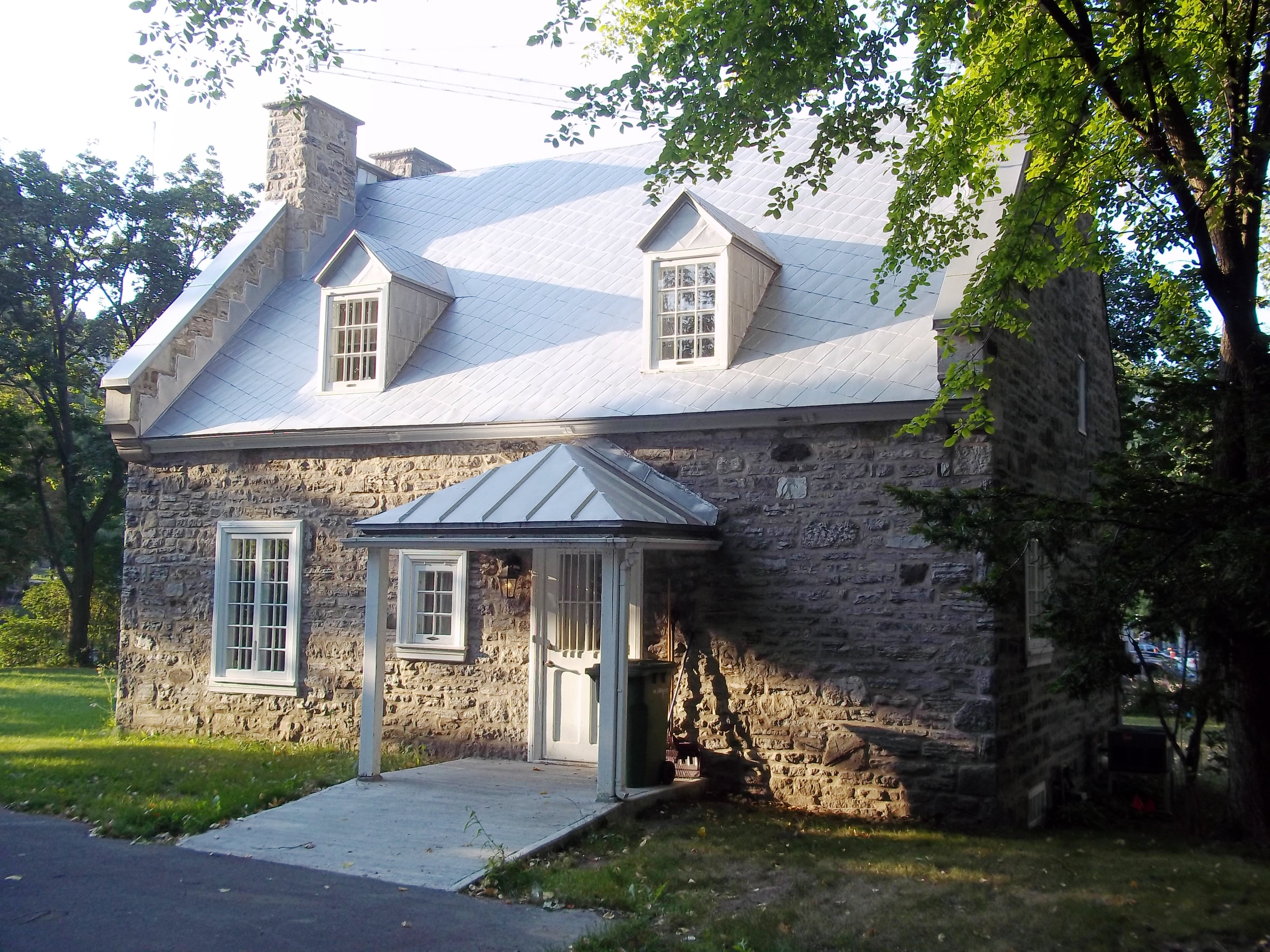
Maison Simon-Lacombe, initially built in 1751, New France, now in Notre Dame des Neiges Cemetery, next to the University of Montreal

Arthur Yale married to Elizabeth Lacombe, a daughter of Emélie Desmarchais and Simon Lacombe, whose ancestral home would later be moved to Notre Dame des Neiges Cemetery as part of a preservation initiative by the city of Montreal. Before being moved, the home had been the property of architect Gratton D. Thomson, builder of a Westmount pavillon of the Montreal Children's Hospital and of another pavillon at Lower Canada College.

Yale's residences were on Côte-des-Neiges Road and on Lorimier Street in Plateau-Mount Royal. He later lived at 69 Cote-des-Neiges Road next to Cote-des-Neiges Armoury and Notre Dame des Neiges Cemetery, at the entrance of Westmount Summit. Yale was an amateur of yachting in Saint-Eustache along with his brother-in-law Joseph Lacombe, who owned the neighboring island named Joseph-Lacombe Island. In 1913, he was part of the regatta races; his yacht "Claire" won the first place in a contest at the nautical club.

He became a founding member of the Nautical Club of Saint-Eustache in 1909, and a board director. Yale was a judge and member of the reception committee of the yacht club, along with politician Hector Champagne and Charles de Bellefeuille, family of the ex Lord of Bellefeuille. Members on the general committee included various mayors, politician Frederick Debartzch Monk, grandson of Lord Pierre-Dominique Debartzch, a Harvard graduate, and others.

Arthur Yale had number of cousins, among which were lawyer Jacob Yale Fortier and Esther Yale, wife of Joseph Bremner Clearihue of Westmount, merchant and alderman of the City of Montreal under mayors James Cochrane, Raymond Préfontaine and Sir Hormisdas Laporte. He was a cofounder and President of the Gould Cold Storage Co. in Griffintown, and a partner of Capt. John A. Macmaster, master Mariner of the Port of Montreal, and father of Andrew Ross McMaster. He was also a land speculator in Westmount and was in a partnership with industrialists William Strachan, cofounder of Her Majesty's Theatre, Senator Alfred Thibaudeau and mayor Raymond Préfontaine.

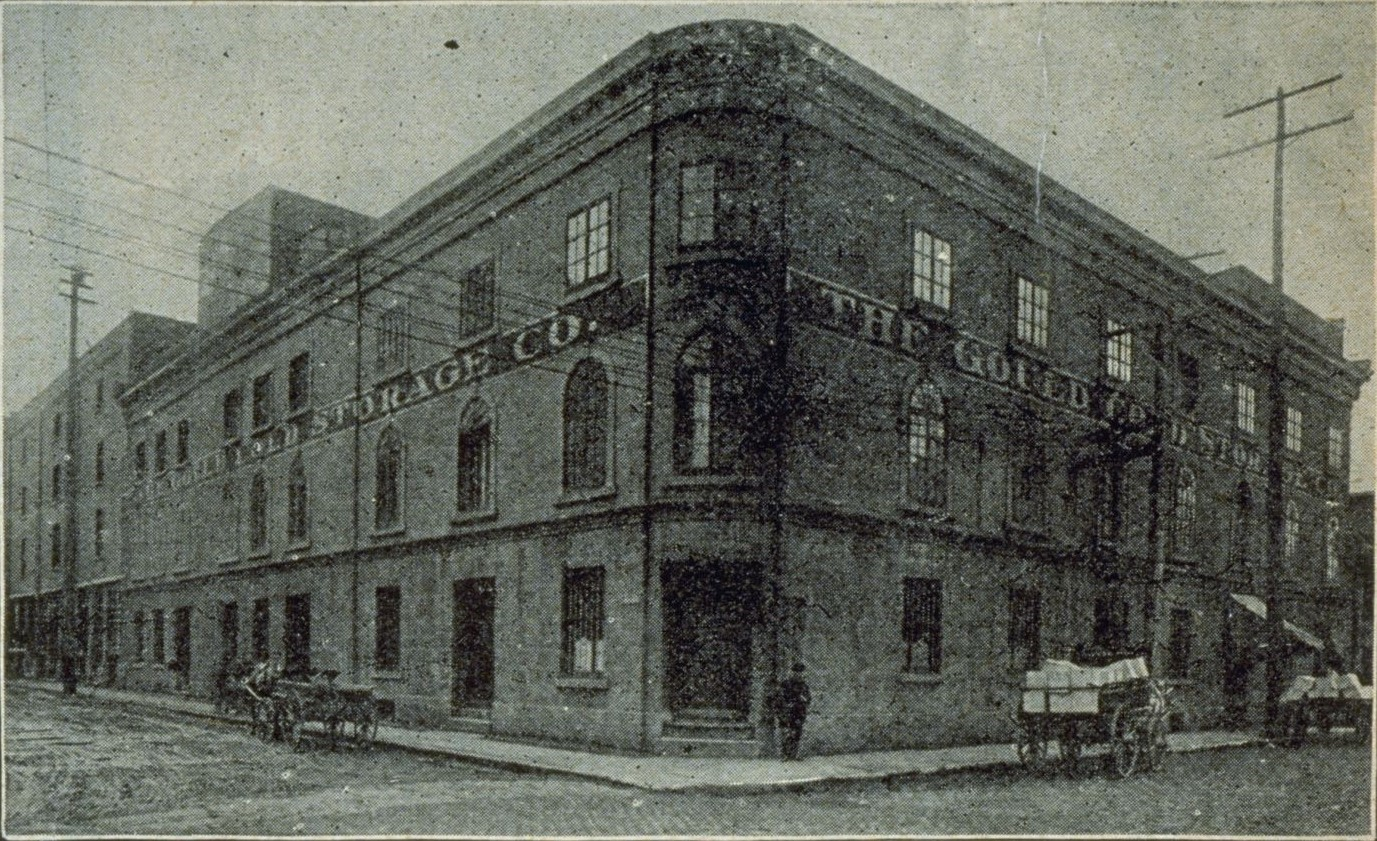
Gould Cold Storage Co.'s plant, William Street, Griffintown, Montreal, 1905

George A. Yale, Milton M. Yale and Harold E. Yale from Outremont, proprietors of Yale Lithographing & Printing Co. and Yale Realty Co. on St. Paul Street, were Master printers and had a real estate investment and brokerage firm, dealing heavily in Outremont. One of the Yales was a member of the Real Estate Exchange under president Ucal-Henri Dandurand, an associate of Sir Herbert Samuel Holt, cofounder of Ritz-Carlton Montreal. A distant cousin was wholesale grocer Charles H. Beckwith, father of New York artist James Carroll Beckwith, who was a member of the Social Register and neighbor of Cornelius Vanderbilt II in New York, builder of The Breakers.

Arthur Yale died on March 6, 1917, in Cote-des-Neiges, at 57 years old. He ran unsuccessfully for the office of Alderman of Montreal at Montreal City Hall one year before his death. With his wife Elizabeth Lacombe, Yale had 4 children. He was buried at Notre Dame des Neiges Cemetery. His only heiress was his daughter Claire Yale, who is recorded going to court to make law changes. She applied to the Quebec Legislature by private bill for the modifications of certain clauses of the will to be able to sell some properties. Her son, John Yale, born Jean-Paul, became a British artist and cousin of Dr. Pierre-Paul Yale and Dr. Jean-Francois Yale. John Yale was Canada's only full-time aviation artist and emigrated to the U.K., where he exposed his paintings at the Royal Society of British Artists in London, England. He also worked with Air Vice Marshal Peter Anthony Latham, and Air Marshal Sir Harold Maguire, later Director-General of Intelligence for the Ministry of Defence.
