= John Yale (aviation artist) =

Aviation artist in Canada and Britain (1925–1998)

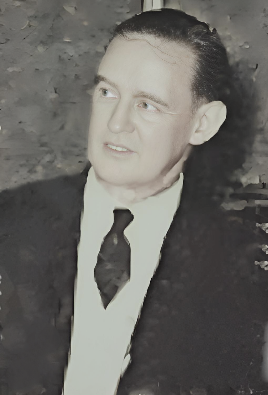
Portrait of John Yale, aviation artist in London, England

John Yale (1925 – 1998) was a Canadian British artist. He was Canada's only full-time aviation painter, and the only non-British member of the Society of Aviation Artists of Britain. He painted for the Royal Air Force and his works were exposed at the Royal Society of British Artists in London, England.

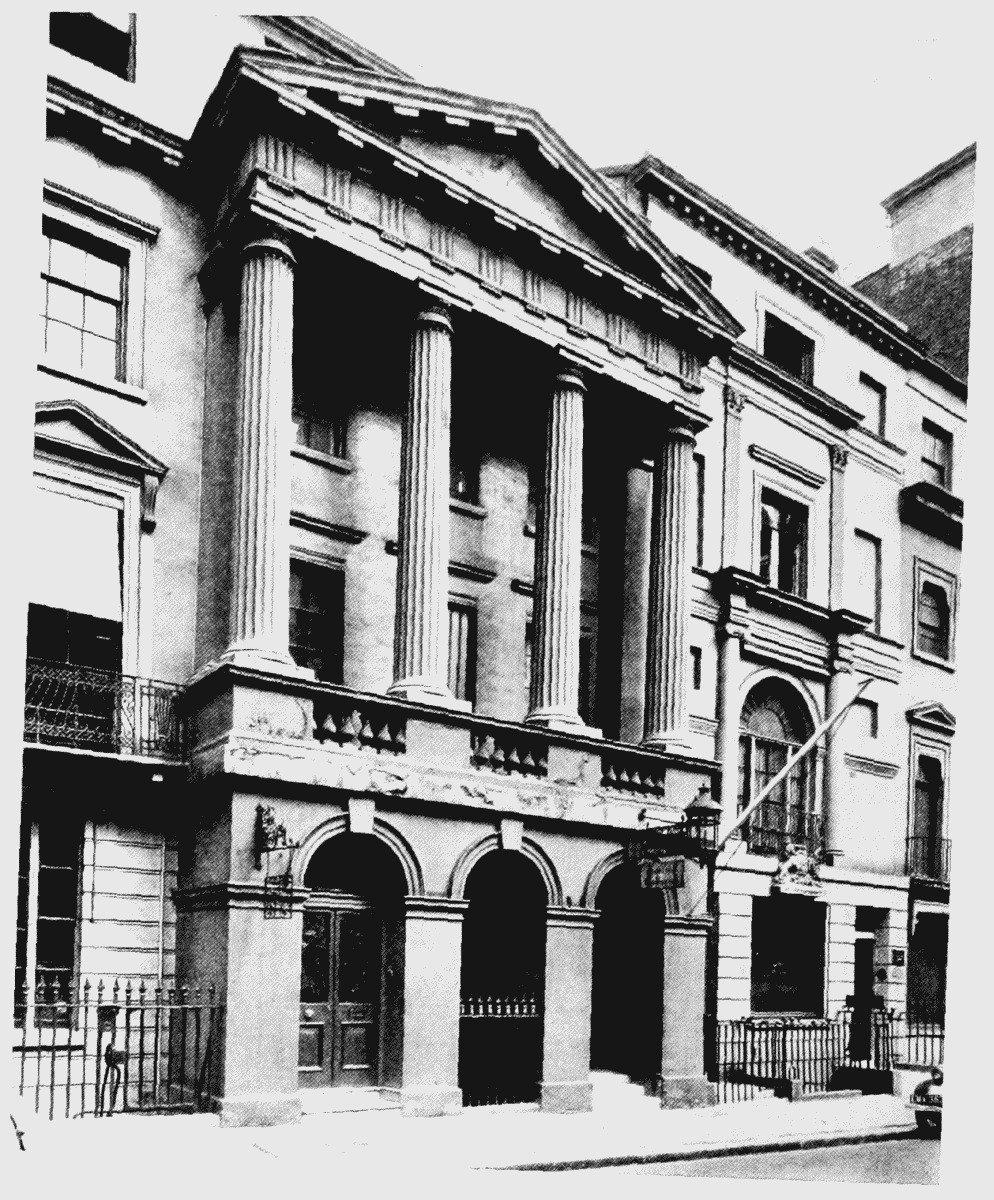
Royal Society of British Artists, Suffolk Street, 1940, City of Westminster, London

== Early life ==
John Yale, née Jean-Paul Yale, was born in Montreal in June 1925, to Joseph Hormidas Lacourse and Claire Yale, members of the Yale family. He came from a wealthy family of Cote-des-Neiges, Montreal, who passed their summers at their private islands in Saint-Eustache, Quebec, named the Yale Islands. He received the surname of his mother rather than the one of his father, and his parents divorced a few months after their marriage. His father was his mother's chauffeur, as Claire Yale was an heiress and proprietor of the Yale Islands on Rivière des Mille Îles since her father's death.

Yale's grandfather was politician Arthur Yale and his cousins included lawyer Jacob Yale Fortier, and doctor Pierre-Paul Yale. His mother filed for divorce four months after their marriage, and obtained a divorce in May 1930 by the Parliament of Canada. She also obtained the full custody of her son after the decision of Lord Justice Mackinnon, who considered a letter written by his father stipulating that he was resolved "to do everything in his power to instill in the child's mind hatred and disrespect for his mother". They were both Roman Catholics, and the mother was represented by King's Counsel Louis Diner.

Yale attended boarding schools. He started painting in 1939 while he was still a student at Sir George Williams College in Montreal. In 1945, he assisted the funerals of his cousin, King's Counsel Alfred Cinq-mars of Outremont, husband of Enora Yale. Other attendees included Monsignor Joseph-Conrad Chaumont, judge Louis Philippe Demers, judge Charles-Auguste Bertrand, alderman Joseph-Marie Savignac, politician Paul-Émile Côté, and others.

== Biography ==
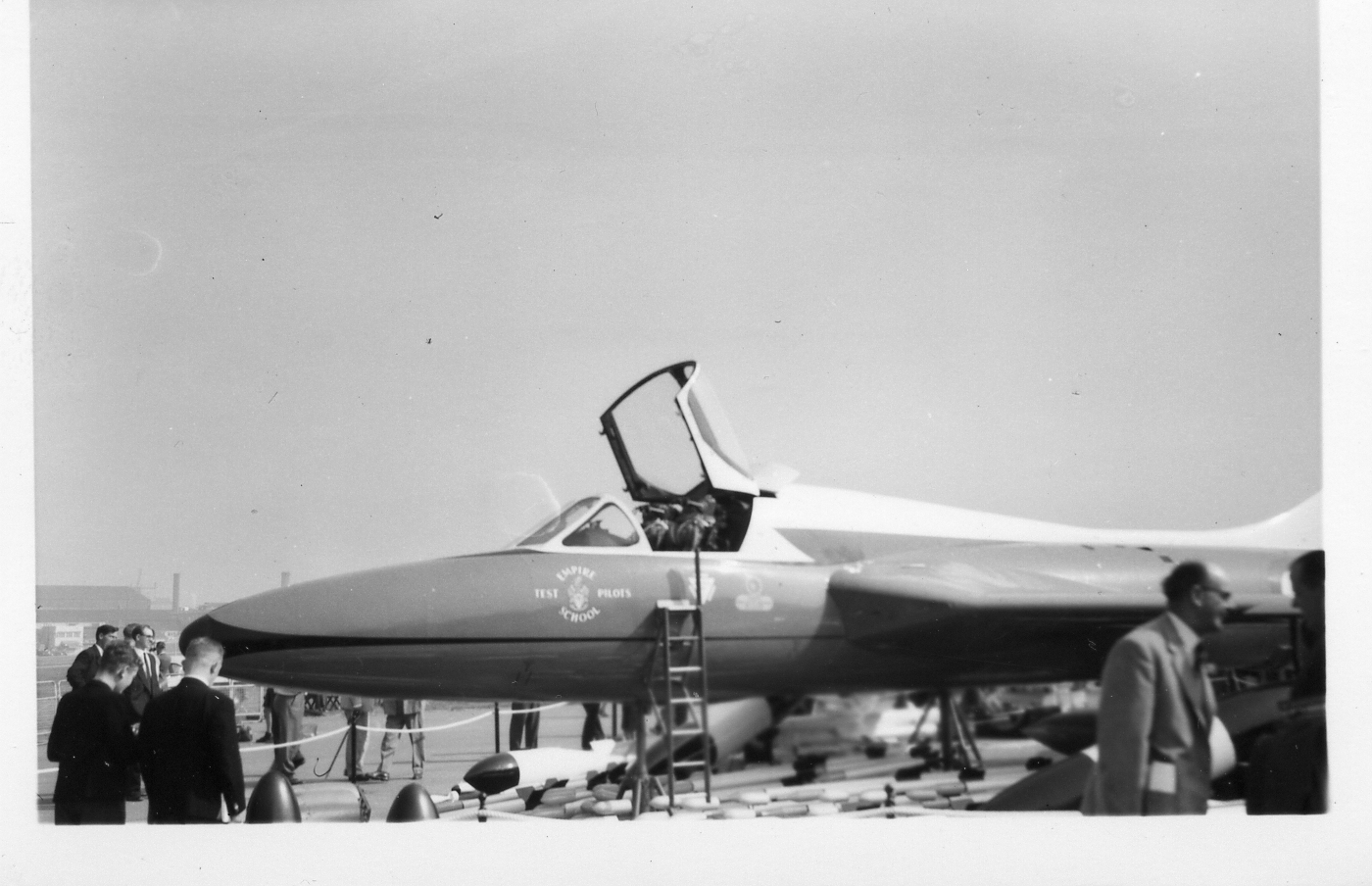
The Hawker Hunter of the Royal Air Force at the Farnborough Airshow of 1959, where Yale painted his works

John Yale started painting aviation works in 1946 while taking private flying lessons as a hobby, which would stop after an accident. In 1949, during a motorcycle accident on the highway in Côte-des-Neiges, Montreal, Yale was injured at one of his legs. He would then be transferred to St. Mary's Hospital, where his leg would be amputated. He then kept painting various works on aviation and went to Britain in June 1959, where he would live thereafter. Yale would become the only non-British member of the Society of Aviation Artist, and Canada's only full-time aviation painter.

In 1959, he exposed 23 paintings as a one-man exhibition of aviation works at the Royal Society of British Artists in London, one of Britain's foremost art galleries. His paintings were made during his convalescence, painted thinly in oils and with very few preliminary sketchings, accelerating the process of creation. Some of his paintings were 5 feet by 4 feet and most of them covered extensively the Farnborough Airshow of 1959.

He received contracts from the Distant Early Warning Line airbase of the Royal Canadian Air Force in Canada, and was invited and received as a guest by the Royal Swedish Air Force in Sweden. He painted numerous works for the Swedish Air Force at their military bases, and prepared for future exhibitions in Paris, and in Canada thereafter. During his career, Yale sold hundreds of paintings in Canada, including a few to the proprietors of Jarry Motors in Outremont, Montreal.

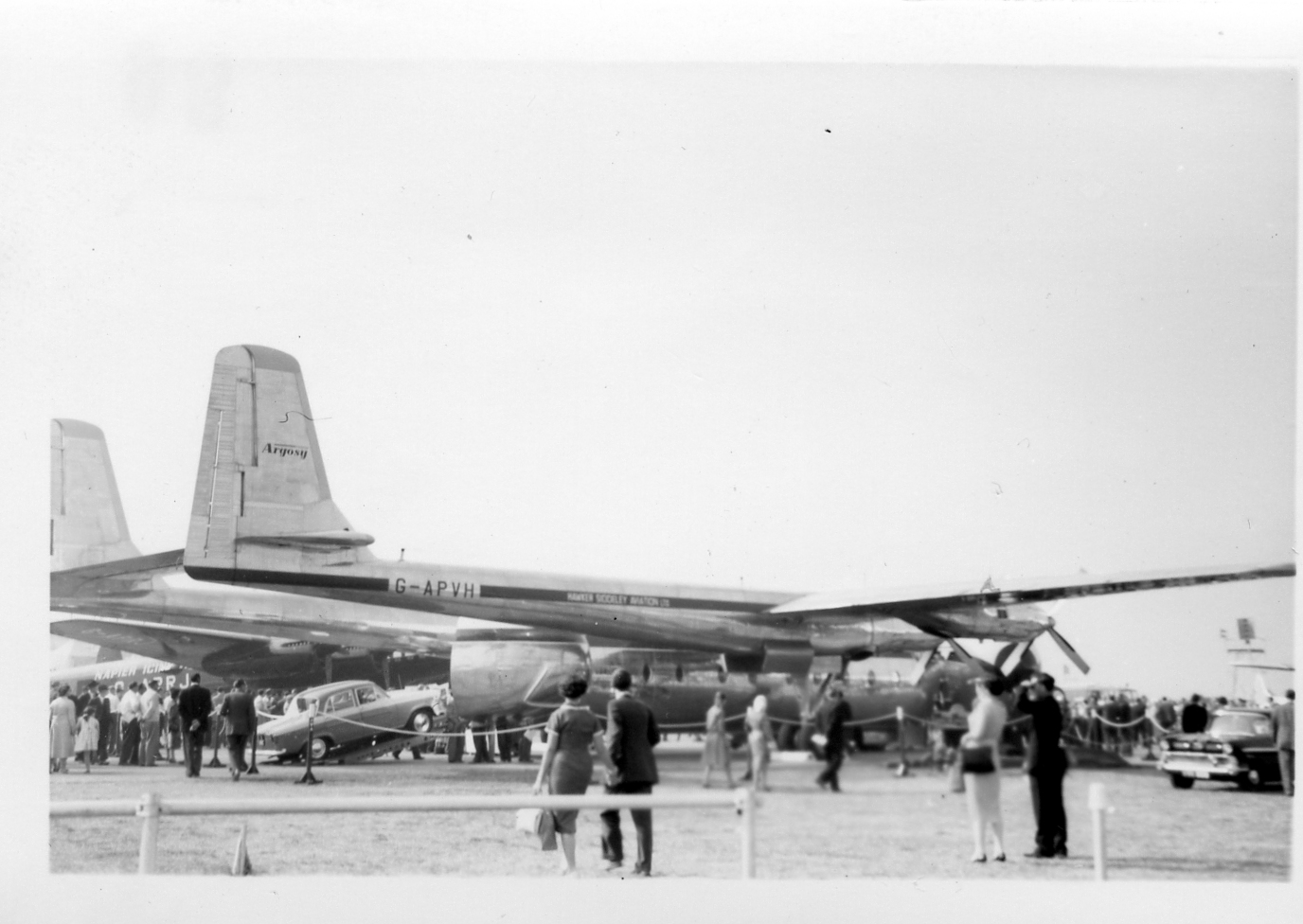
The Armstrong Whitworth at the Farnborough Airshow of 1959, where Yale painted numerous airplanes

All his 23 paintings at the Royal Society of British Artists gallery were about the Royal Air Force. He had followed the Royal Air Force Aerobatic Team, nicknamed the Red Arrows, to be closer to the subject of his work, and stayed at number of military bases of the Royal Air Force. He painted the last flypast of the World War II Hawker Hurricane, as well as the last Supermarine Spitfire fighters of the Air Force, who flew over London on Battle of Britain Day in 1940. The Battle of Britain featured the Royal Air Force defending Britain against the Luftwaffe, Nazi Germany's air force.

This painting was presented to the RAF Fighter Command during his exhibition. The painting was named "The Last Fly-past", and was received by Air Vice-Marshal Sir Harold John Maguire, on behalf of the Royal Air Force. Sir Maguire flew the Spitfire Fighter during World War II, and other fighters of the RAF included the Gloster Meteor and the Hawker Hunter.

Another painting named "Thanks Again for Everything" was also gifted by Yale to Air Vice-Marshal Maguire in 1959. Yale passed some time at the RAF Wattisham Airfield, and Air Vice Marshal Peter Anthony Latham paid tribute to Yale's painting and reputation as an artist in Britain. Yale was also featured in 1959 in the Waterloo Region Record, at the same time as Pablo Picasso, who was asking artitsts to donate some of their best works for a fund-raising event at an art gallery in Paris.

== Later life ==
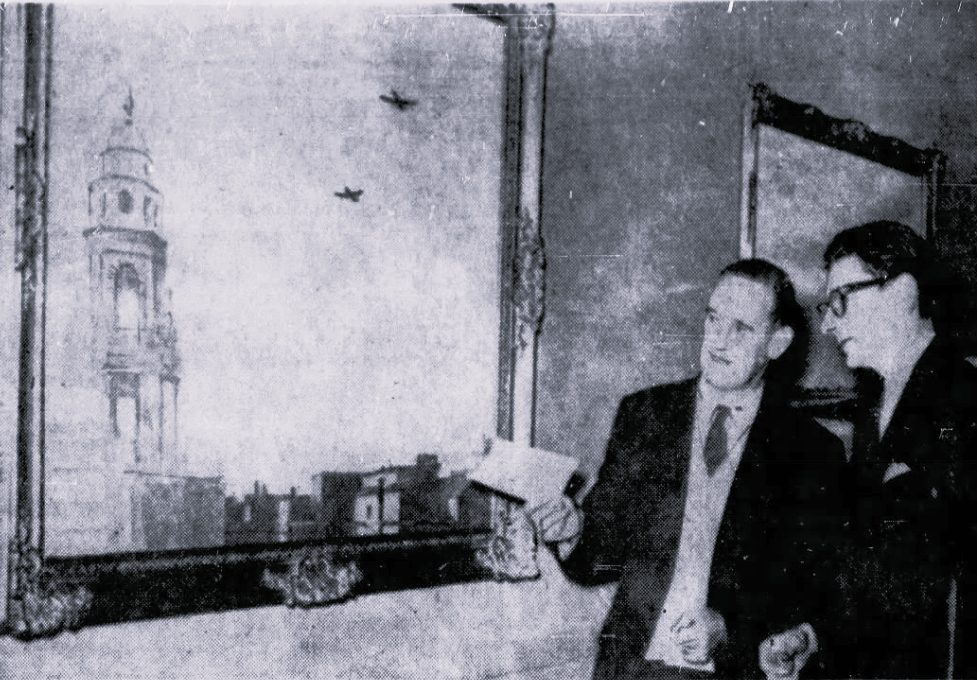
Painting of Yale at an art gallery in London, gifted to Air Marshal Sir Harold John Maguire on the right

Yale exposed his works at the exhibition of the Industrial Painters Group in 1962. Terence Cuneo was the association's president as well as one of the featured artist. The exhibition was at Guildhall in the City of London. Others artists at the exhibition with Yale included Charlotte Halliday, daughter of artist Edward Halliday, Druie Bowett, Hermione Hammond, painter Harry Baines, husband of artist Pauline Baines, and others.

In 1966, Yale received with his wife at their home in Montreal Miss Lillian Chartrand, to be married with the Chief Justice of Canada, John Richard, appointed by Prime Minister Jean Chrétien. In 1968, Yale designed an annual memorative envelope on Shakespeare's birthday, in black on yellow, depicting a miniature reproduction of the page of The First Folio edition of Shakespeare, and some drawings of his characters such as Julius Caesar and King Lear. The envelopes were made under the Stratford-upon-Avon Philatelic Society, members of the Association of British Philatelic Societies, seated at Stratford-on-Avon Racecourse.

In 1969, for the commemoration of William Shakespeare's birthday, he designed a second serie of special envelopes showing characters from "The Merry Wives of Windsor", played at the Royal Shakespeare Theatre in England, property of the Royal Shakespeare Company. It was also issued by the Straford-upon-Avon Philatelic Society.

John Yale died in 1998 in Ludlow, Shropshire, England, near Birmingham. His mother Claire Yale had died one year before in 1997. His son, Jean Yale, was a radio host and worked in Montreal and Paris with artists Charles Dullin, René Simon and Sita Riddez. He also worked with artists Paul Guèvremont, Jacques Auger, Jean Desprez and Marcelle Barthe, Royal tour commentator of the young Princess Elizabeth of England.
