= Jacob Yale Fortier =

Lawyer from Montreal

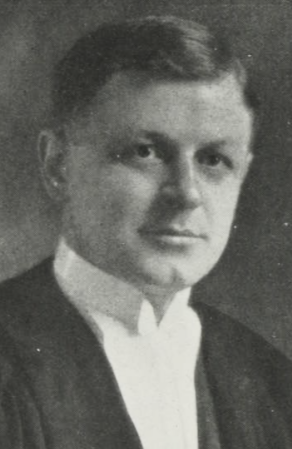
- Jacob Yale Fortier, Judge of Montreal-East, 1923
- Born: 3 October 1888; Saint-David, Quebec, Canada
- Died: 13 September 1940 (aged 51–52); Old Montreal, Quebec
- Occupations: lawyer, judge, businessman
- Spouse: Marie Pomerleau
- Family: Yale

Frederic Jacob Yale Fortier (1888 – 1940) was a prominent lawyer, judge, King's Counsel and businessman from Montreal. He became Recorder of Montreal-East, vice-president of the Law Faculty of Laval University, and a partner of Senator Jacob Nicol. He was the proprietor and board director of dozens of corporations, including companies operating in finance, real estate, manufacturing, alcohol and retail. He also gave public talks on Napoleon, which he admired, and became a Knight of Columbus.

== Early life ==
Born on August 3, 1888, at St-David of Yamaska, Jacob Yale Fortier was the son of Dr. Louis-Alexandre Fortier and Marie-Antoinette Lambert, daughter of Major Francois-Xavier Lambert, doctor from Mcgill and Justice of the Peace. He was a grandson of Mary Victoria Yale, daughter of Major George Henry Yale, and a cousin of politician Arthur Yale, socialite Claire Yale, artist John Yale, and Dr. Pierre-Paul Yale, members of the Yale family.

Yale Fortier's grandfather was politician Moise Fortier, Member of Parliament for 14 years and active during the formation of Canada, when the Canadian Confederation united the provinces of Upper Canada and Lower Canada. His grandfather was also Mayor of Saint-David-d'Yamaska, Justice of the Peace and President of the Richelieu, Drummond and Arthabaska Railway.

His father Dr. Fortier, a friend of politician François-Sévère Désaulniers, initially practiced in Massachusetts before coming back to Saint-David where he became Mayor, Alderman, President of the commission on Catholic schools and French journal clerk of the legislative council, replacing Napoléon Legendre, grandfather of Maurice Roy, Cardinal and Archbishop of Quebec. His brother was a lawyer from Trois-Rivières, and his two uncles were the abbot Jacob Fortier of St. Joseph Cathedral, California, and Dr. Alma Fortier of Minnesota.

Yale Fortier was educated at College St-Aime-sur-le-Richelieu. He then started his studies in 1900 at Nicolet College, finishing his studies at the College of Montreal. He studied in 1912 at Laval University in Quebec City, then became a lawyer in Montreal in 1912. He was made King's Counsel in Sherbrooke in 1923, and King's Counsel once more in Montreal in 1926. He received his nomination at the same time as Wilfrid Girouard, Oscar Drouin and Léon Casgrain.

== Career ==
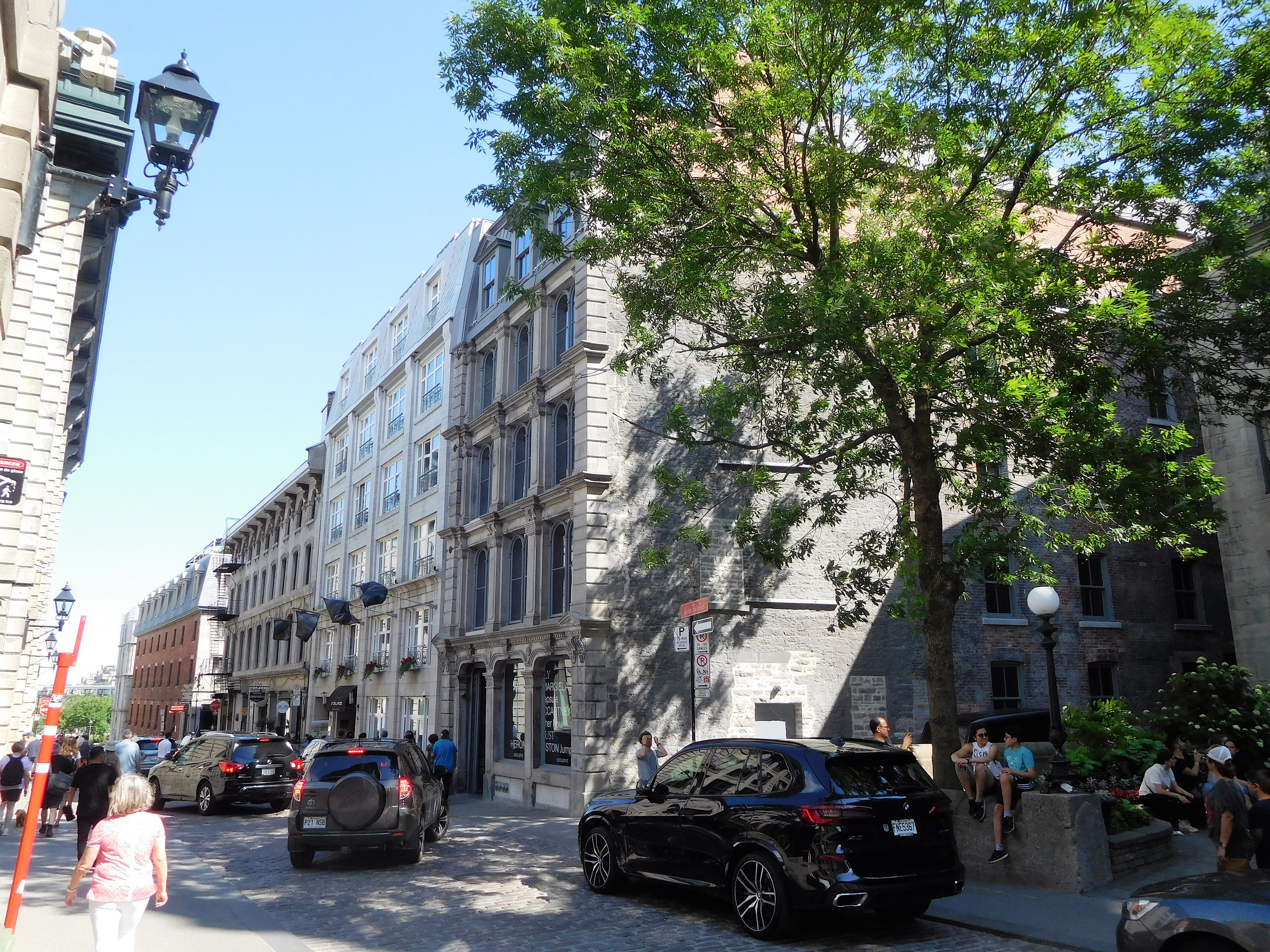
Offices of Yale Fortier in Old Montreal, on Saint-Sulpice Street, first office building on the right, now named the Magasin-entrepot Saint-Sulpice

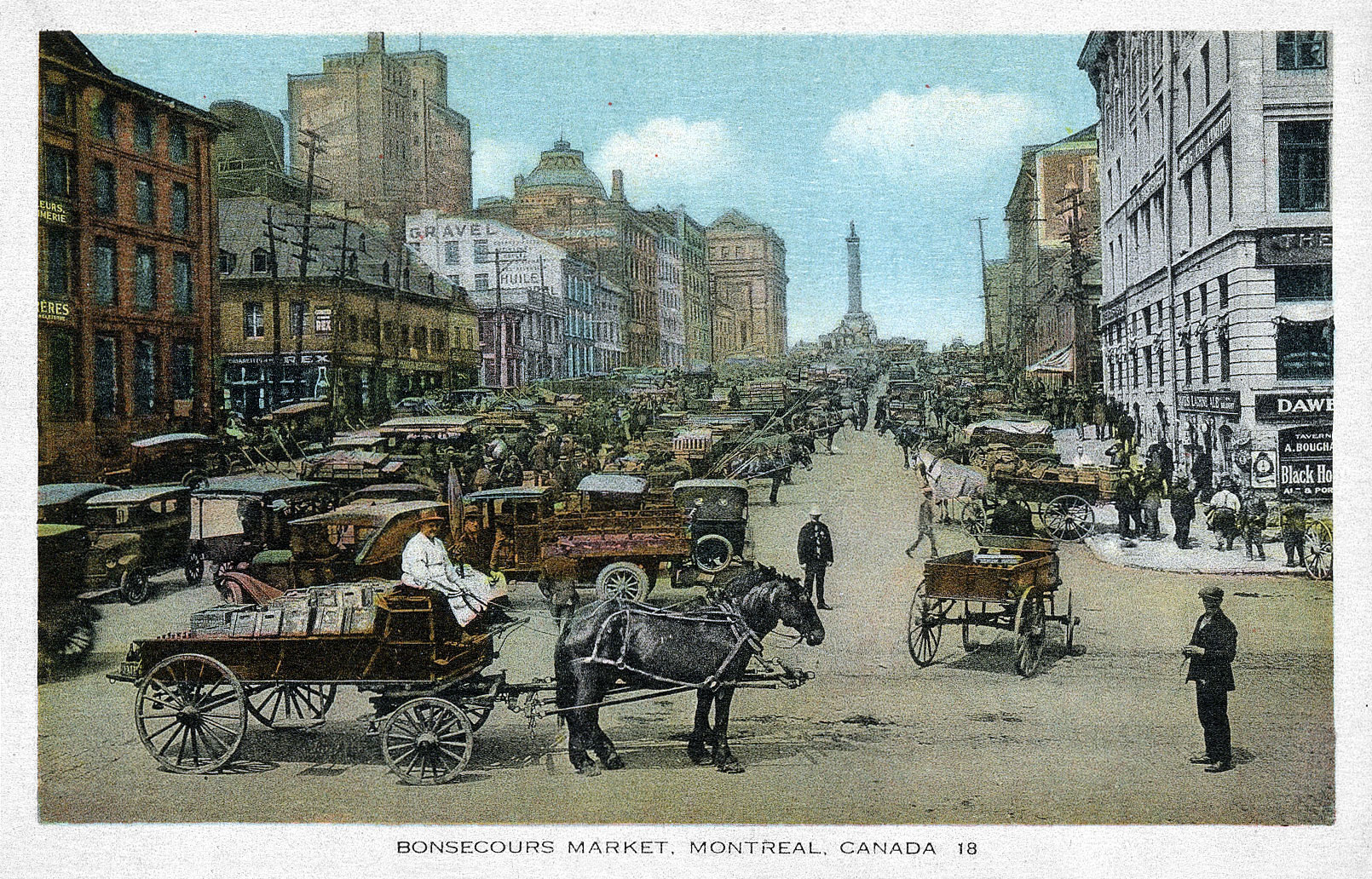
Place Jacques-Cartier, Montreal, in the early 1920s

He became a partner of the law firms Weindfield, Sperber, Ledieu & Fortier, of Pilon & Fortier, and of Pelissier, Wilson & Fortier. In 1924, he left his practice in Montreal to become a lawyer in Sherbrooke, and became a partner in the firm Nicol, Lazure, Couture & Fortier. He later became vice-president of the Law Department of Laval University. After a few years in Sherbrooke, he came back to Montreal and became a partner of lawyer Demetrius Baril, joining the firm of Peron & Vallee. By 1926, he became the partner of Ernest Pelissier, who was the Bâtonnier of Montreal, being the head of the Bar of Montreal at Édifice Lucien-Saulnier, and succeeding to Joseph-Léonide Perron, later Minister of Transports under Premier of Quebec, Louis-Alexandre Taschereau.

With M. Pelissier, he was also Prosecutor of the School Board of Saint-Grégoire of Thaumaturge. Their other partner was Guillaume St-Pierre, lawyer-in-chief of the city of Montreal. He then became a partner of Senator and newspapers proprietor Jacob Nicol, also Treasurer of Quebec, Judge Wilfrid Lazure and lawyer J. S. Couture, who were also Batonniers of the Barreau de Saint-François. Their firm, Nicol, Lazure, Couture & Fortier, had office at Edifice Olivier, angle of Wellington Street and King Street in Old Montreal.

In 1928, Yale Fortier attended the banquet of Minister Joseph-Édouard Perrault, law partner of Sir Charles Fitzpatrick, Lt. Gov. of Quebec, and Louis-Alexandre Taschereau, Premier of Quebec. He was a member of Cercle Universitaire, honorary member of the 5th Military officers Regiment of Sherbrooke, member of the Sherbrooke Canoe Club, and became a Knight of Columbus. He was also a member of the Saint-Jean-Baptiste Society, along with dozens of doctors, and of the St. Lawrence Kiwaynis Club. He became Recorder (Judge) of Montreal-East in 1929, becoming a Magistrate of Montreal and was nominated at the Palais de Justice.

Yale Fortier was a public speaker on Napoleon Bonaparte; a man he strongly admired for his love of France, and was covered in the newspaper La Presse. At the time of his discourses, he was Recorder (Judge) of Montreal-East, and saw Napoleon as a man oriented toward peace and progress, not after wealth, and envied by Russia and England for his military prowess. His discourses were given at the Societe des Oliviers, cofounded by Lt. Col. Antonio Barrette, Premier of Quebec.

Throughout the 1910s, Yale Fortier founded number of enterprises which would have, in total capital stock, a value of about $850,000, or over 500 million dollars in 2024 money in relation to GDP. They operated in various industries, including real estate, jewelry, manufacturing, retail, automobiles, clothing, metal, alcohol and others. His partner in the ventures was Marcus Meyer Sperber, a lawyer and Queen's Counsel of Westmount, while another business partner, Henry Weinfield, was a lawyer, King's Counsel of Westmount, and counsel of the New York Art Corporation. His other partner, lawyer Pierre Ledieu, was the nephew of politician Georges Duhamel, Solicitor General under Premier Honoré Mercier and supporter of patriot Louis Riel.

== Businesses ==
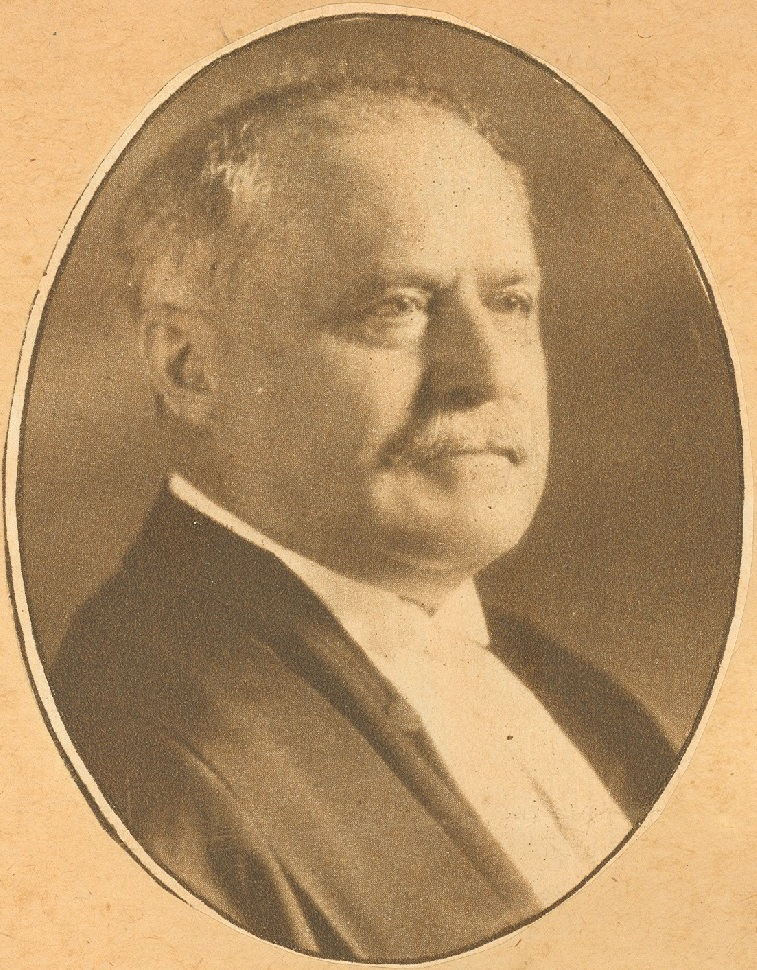
Portrait of Bâtonnier Ernest Pélissier, 1923, head of the Bar of Montreal and partner of Yale Fortier

In 1913, he cofounded the Vosbergs Company, with a capital stock of $100,000, with Henry Weinfield and Pierre Ledieu, and was made board director. In the same year, he founded with the same partners the Valois Lands Company, a real estate investment firm, with a capital stock of $90,000, and was made a board director. In 1914, he cofounded the Germaise Company, with a capital stock of $20,000, being manufacturers of dry goods, clothing and home furnishings, with lawyers and partners Michael Germaise, Thomas H. Tansey and Jessie Brown.

In 1915, he founded the Biltmore Realties Company, with lawyer Abraham Wilfred Muhlstock and accountant Jean Charles Duhamel, a real estate brokerage and investment firm, with a capital stock of $100,000. In the same year, he founded the Diamond Metal Company, with Muhlstock and Duhamel, dealers in all kinds of metal, junk, rags, rubber and other waste material, with a capital stock of $20,000.

In 1916, he founded the Jewel Realty Company, with lawyer Abraham Wilfrid Muhlstock and accountant Jean Charles Duhamel, a real estate brokerage and development firm, with a capital stock of $100,000. In 1916, he founded with the same advocates the Montreal Waterproof & Clothing Company with a capital stock of about $100,000. In 1916, he founded the Tip-It Welding Company with a capital stock of $20,000, and in the same year, founded the Prudential Credit and Financial Bureau Company, with a capital stock of $20,000.

In the same year, he founded with Henry Weinfield, lawyer of Westmount, Marcus Meyer Sperber, Nathan Salomon and Jean-Charles Duhamel, the Guarantee Shoe Store Company, taking over the business of Samuel Bazaar, shoe dealer of Montreal. The enterprise was in the dealing and manufacturing of shoes, rubbers, laces, felts and skins, with a capital stock of $10,000. In the same year, he founded the Desales Manufacturing Company, with a capital stock of $100,000. In 1917, he founded the Compagnie d'Automobile Martel, with Henry Weinfield, Marcus Mayer Sperber, Abraham Muhlstock, all lawyers, and accountant Jean-Charles Duhamel, manufacturers and dealers of carriages, vehicles, wagons, automobiles and electric vehicles, with a capital stock of $20,000.

In 1918, he founded the Nathan Lande Company with Henry Weinfield and Marcus Meyer Sperber, with a capital stock of $35,000, and was one of its board directors. In 1919, Yale Fortier is recorded as one of the co-owners and board directors of the Dominion Bottle Company, Goldfine and Chananie Company, and British 5, 10, 15 and 25 Cents Store Company, all seated in the city of Montreal and with a capital stock of about $100,000. In the same year, he cofounded the Style-Fit Cloack Company, with Lyon Levine, Henry Wienfield and Marcus Meyer Sperber, manufacturer and dealer in both wholesale and retail of ladies garments, with a capital stock of $10,000.

== Death ==
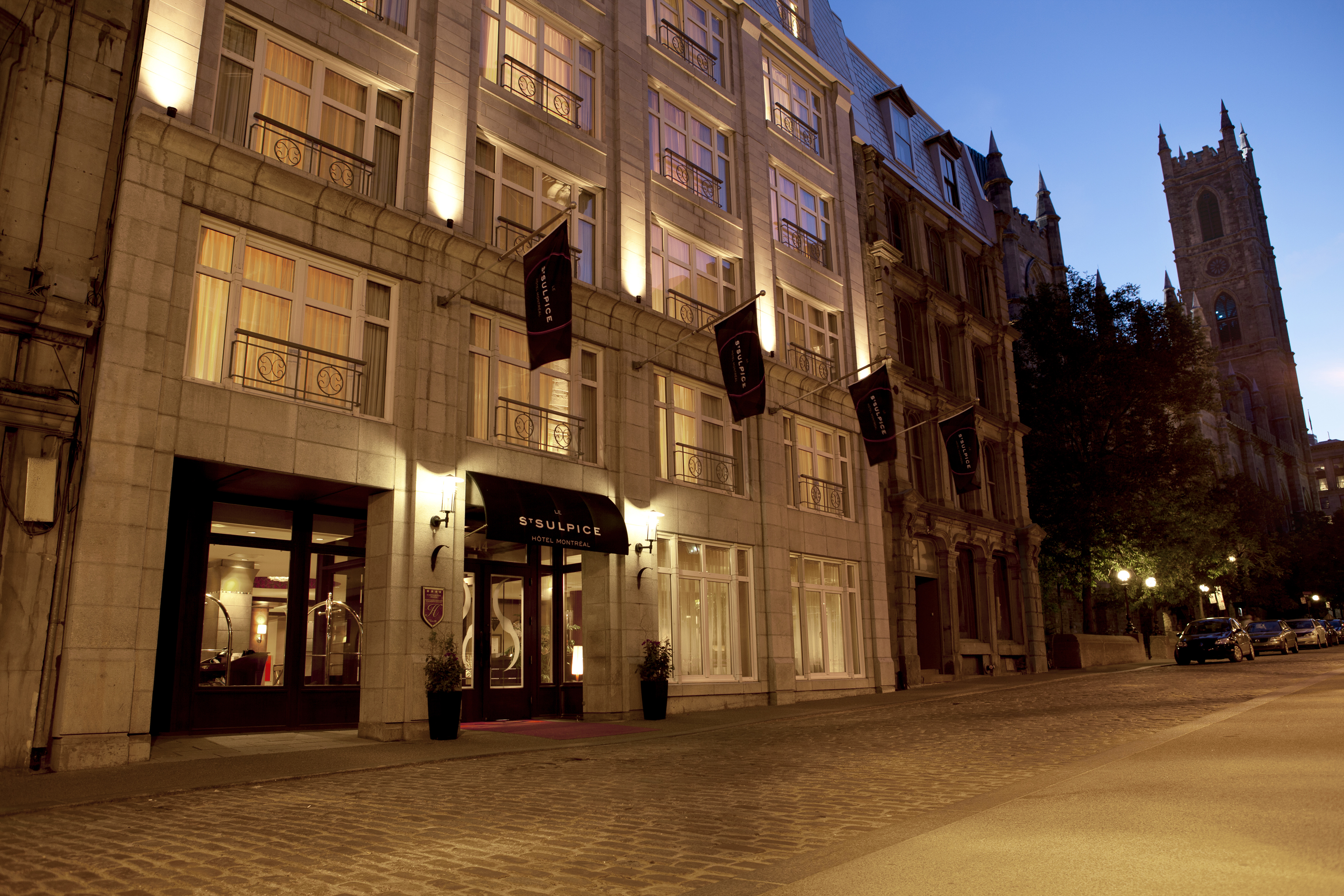
Jacob Yale Fortier's offices on the right, between Hotel St-Sulpice and Notre-Dame Basilica in Old Montreal

Jacob Yale Fortier died on September 13, 1940, at his office at 418 St-Sulpice Street, next to Hotel St-Sulpice and Notre-Dame Basilica in Old Montreal. He was among the most prominent lawyers of Montreal at the time and died while working.

His in-laws included notary Charles Archambault, Dr. Edgar Brosseau, Dr. Archambault and Dr. Ferland. He was buried at Notre-Dame-des-Neiges Cemetery. In attendance were lawyer Alfred Cinqmars of Outremont, nephew of politician Arthur Yale, lawyer Henry Lemaître Auger, Minister under Maurice Duplessis, Arthur Vallee, Bâtonnier of Québec, and dozens of other lawyers and doctors.

Yale Fortier was married to Marie Pomerleau and the curate of Ile-Bizard assisted the ceremony with abbot Emile Lambert.
