= George Henry Yale =

Canadian merchant and politician

- Born: 28 September 1820; Vercheres, Quebec, Canada
- Died: 18 June 1897 (aged 76–77); Montreal, Quebec
- Occupations: fur trader, manufacturer, politician, pioneer
- Spouse: Victoria Laurent
- Children: 1

Major George Henry Yale (28 September 1820 – 18 June 1897) was a Canadian military officer, industrialist and politician. He became one of the founders of Louiseville, Quebec, and was elected its first mayor. He was made Justice of the Peace under Baronet La Fontaine, and was involved in number of ventures related to the fur trade. He was twice candidate for the Parliament of Canada.

He also gave his name to Yaletown village, which he acquired from Lord Samuel Gerrard, president of the Bank of Montreal, and built the second industrial-scale tannery in Canada. Members of his family included fur merchant James Murray Yale, his uncle, and Isabella Yale, his cousin, who became the daughter-in-law of Gov. Sir George Simpson of the Hudson's Bay Company.

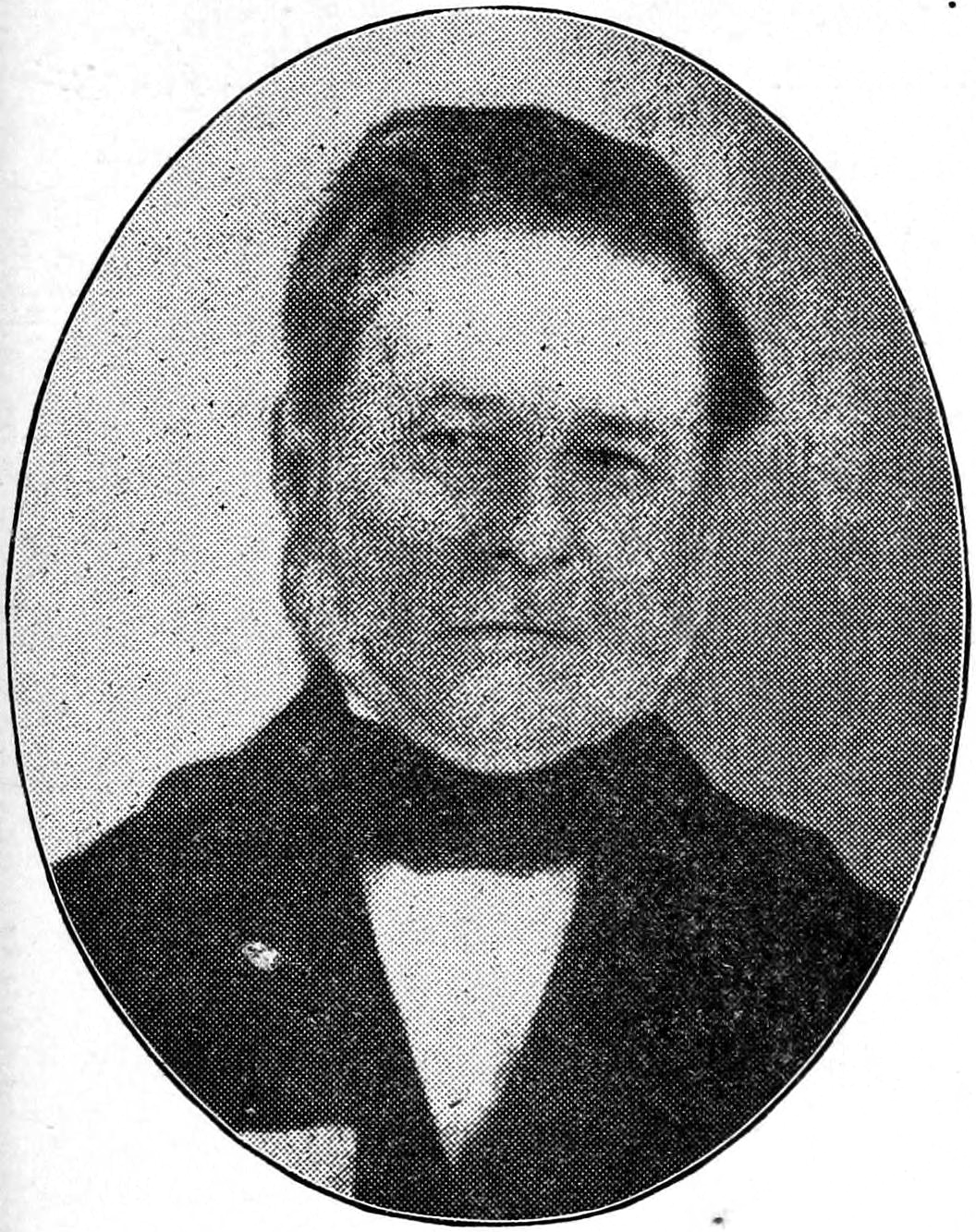
Miles Yale, father of Maj. George Henry Yale (1908)

== Early life ==
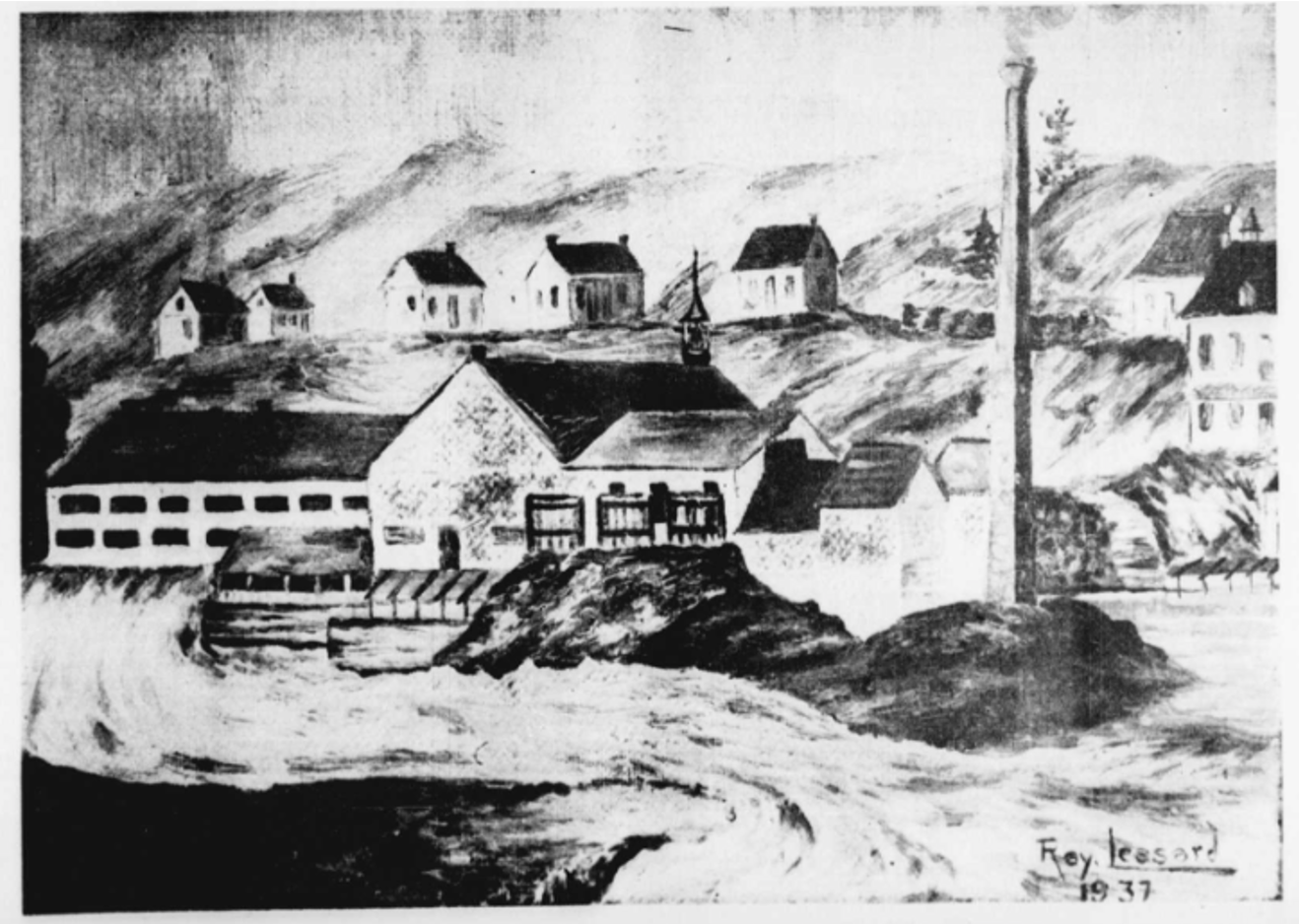
Yaletown village in Louiseville, Quebec, showing the watermill, fur factories and houses, where Maj. Yale's employees lived

George Henry Yale was born on September 28, 1820, in Vercheres, Quebec, to Felicite Picard and tanner Miles Yale, members of the Yale family. His uncle was Chief trader James Murray Yale, commander of Fort Langley during the Fraser Gold Rush, and his granduncle was Capt. Elihu Yale, one of the first bayonet manufacturers in Connecticut. Many members of his family were involved in the North American Fur Trade.

His grandfather Theophilus Yale was a merchant and tenant of the Lord of Argenteuil, Col. James Murray, grandson of Admiral George Murray, 6th Lord Elibank, and died at sea. His cousin Isabella Yale was the daughter-in-law of Sir George Simpson, Governor of the HBC and a large landowner of the Golden Square Mile in Montreal. A cousin married the son of William Dalby, mayor of Victoria, and two others married to chief traders, one of which was the grandson of Etienne Lucier, one of the founders of Fort Astoria for John Jacob Astor.

The other, Capt. Henry Newsham Peers, was the son of Capt. Peers from Trinity College, Oxford, and a grandson of Count Julianus Petrus de Linnée, member of a noble family of Brittany. His New York cousin, Moses Yale Beach, became a pioneer of the penny press newspapers, and the father of innovator Alfred Ely Beach and politician Moses S. Beach, who ran the New York Sun under the presidency of Abraham Lincoln.

George Henry Yale's uncle, Andrew Yale, owned a shipbuilding company in Old Montreal and Hochelaga, manufacturing steamers, sloops and barges. His customers included the family of the Lords of Boucherville, through Dr. Charles Boucher de Grosbois, brewer merchant. Grosbois was the brother-in-law of Sir Charles Boucher de Boucherville, Premier of Quebec, and cousin of Louis-Tancrède Bouthillier, who gave the name of his manor "Outre-Mont" to the city of Outremont. Other clients were the trading firm of Henderson, Hooker & Co., dealing with the future Minister of Finance Luther Hamilton Holton, master brewer and horse boat owner, Victor Chenier, brother of patriot Jean-Olivier Chénier, and merchant Henri Monjeau of Longueuil.

== Career ==
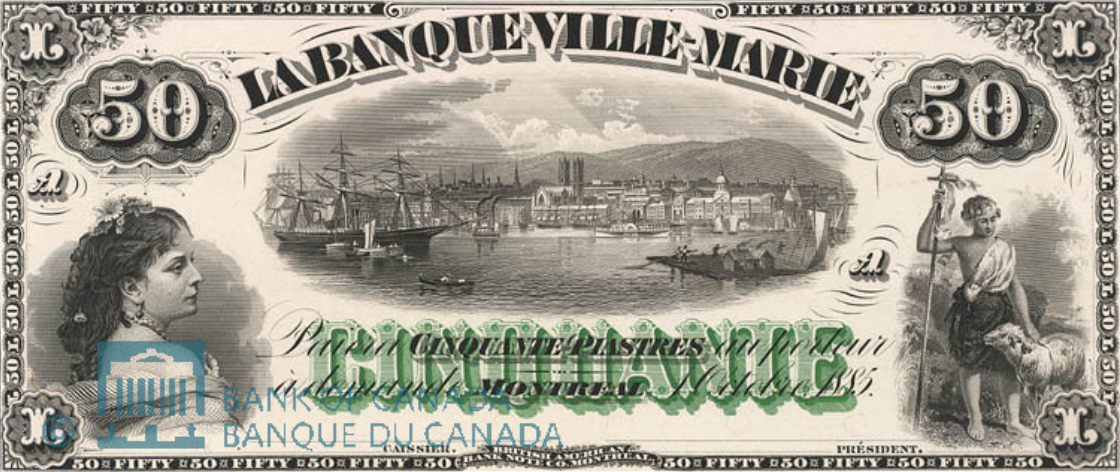
The Banque-Ville Marie of Montreal, 1855, bankers of Yale's business in Louiseville

George Henry Yale followed his family as a child to St-Antoine de la Rivière-du-Loup. He later established his family at Rivière-du-Loup around 1850, opening a 3 stories tannery with a few family members and employees. In 1856, Yale bought land on the Maskinongé River from Samuel Gerrard, Lord of Carufel and Lanaudière, and gave it the name of Yaletown. He built on the land a tannery, two commercial buildings, a mill, a saw mill and a flour mill. The village formed around its waterfall, which allowed Yale to use its current as a source of energy for his businesses. He then paved the roads, build houses for his employees, linked the village to Louiseville and built a bridge.

In 1860, Yale's shop and buildings burned down uninsured, bringing a loss of about $6,000. The tannery is then under the management of his brother Sylvestre Yale and their nephew William Laurent, under the name of Yale, Laurent & Company. In 1864, Yale acquired 1,350 acres in the lordship of Maskinonge from Canadian politician George Moffatt, who was a peer of Colin Robertson and his uncle James Murray Yale in the fur trade. In 1868, Yale paid back $70,000 of debts to Americans Brown & Childs, who were one of the largest shoe manufacturers of Montreal. By 1871, Yale's shop is the largest factory in the region of Lake Saint Pierre, with steam engines and 30 employees, producing 10,000 black and red leather products, 5,000 skins, and sales of about $50,000, or 20 million dollars in 2024 money in relation to wages. Yale acquired it back from his family in 1872, with Maj. Lambert as a partner, and added the company to his portfolio of businesses, now including the village of Yaletown with its fourteen houses.

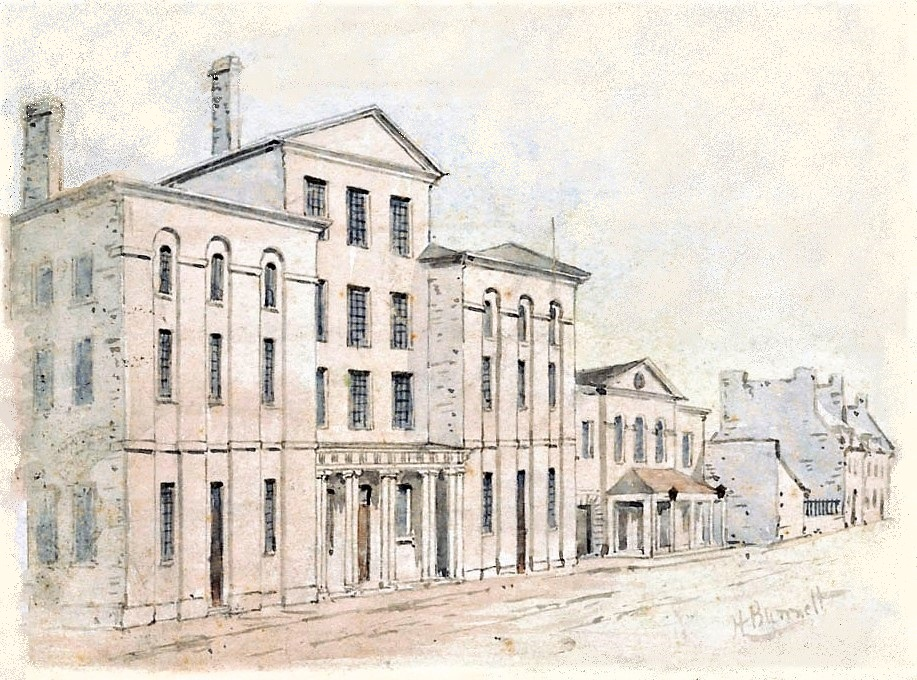
Maj. Yale was a guest in 1868 at the British American Hotel, at Bonsecours Market, Old Montreal, initially built by John Molson

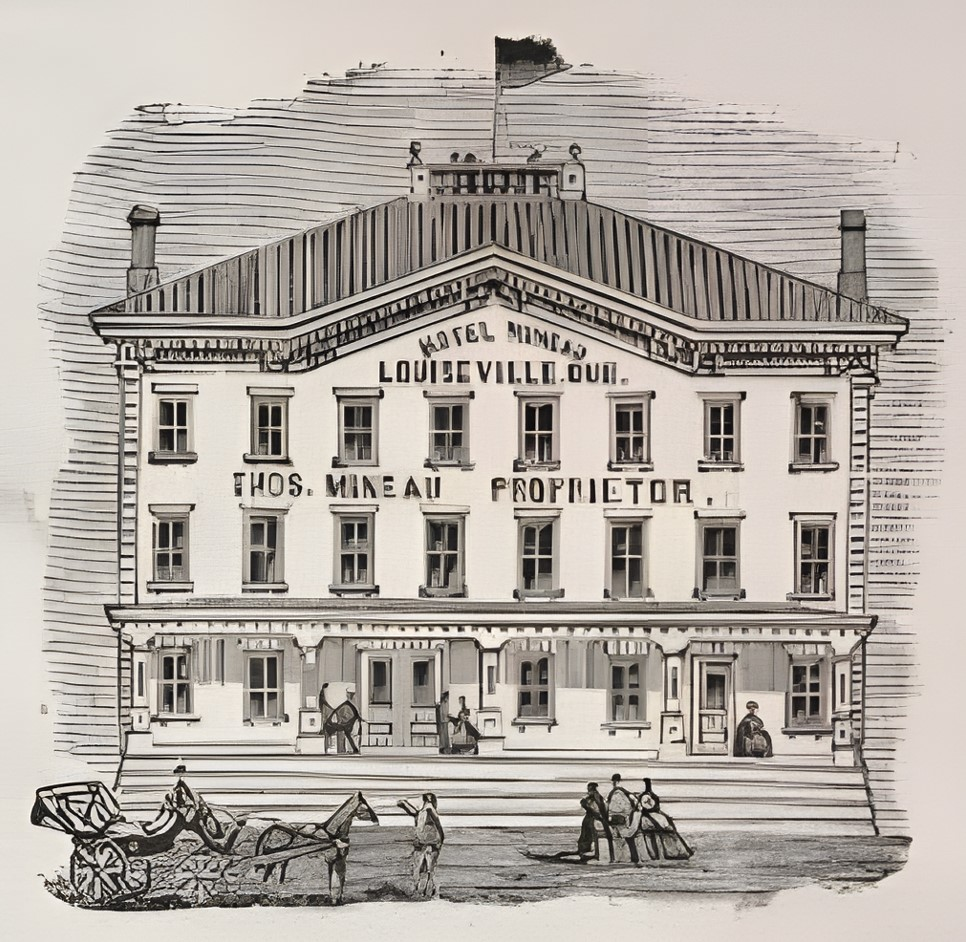
Hotel Mineau in Louiseville, Quebec, Mauricie region, Maj. Yale lived at the hotel on the right side

By this time, Yale also had another tannery, a saw mill, a grinding mill and a shop in Saint-Didace, Quebec. In 1869, he is made a Major in the militia of Maskinonge, having been previously a captain, and George Caron is made Lieutenant Colonel. On September 2, 1868, Yale is recorded a customer of the luxurious British American Hotel in Old Montreal, built by John Molson, and had been previously a guest of the Cosmopolitan Hotel in 1859. In 1871, his leather manufacturing business represented about 62% of the total economic output of Rivière-du-Loup. Yale became the general agent of the Union Mutual Life Insurance Company around 1872, seated at 99 Saint-François-Xavier Street, in Old Montreal.

In 1873, Yale sold his properties to F. Shaw & Bros, tanners of Montreal, which were sold back to Donoan & Moran, leather manufacturers of Montreal. In 1876, the fur factories burned down once again, and Yale bought them back and rebuilt the tanneries. In 1879, Major George Henry Yale was made mayor of Rivière-du-Loup, and on January 17, 1880, he became the first mayor of the newly incorporated town of Louiseville, Quebec. His son-in-law, Maj. Lambert became one of the aldermen of the city, and Yale was reelected mayor in 1882, and alderman in 1883.

Yale's son-in-law, Major Francois-Xavier Lambert, served under Col. Charles-Eugène Panet, later Senator, and was among the general staff of Sir Adolphe-Philippe Caron, Minister of Militia and Defence, and Maj. Gen. Sir Frederick D. Middleton. Lambert then served at the adjutant general office under Commanding Gen. Sir Edward S. Smyth, and was made Senior Major under Lt. Col. de Lotbinière Harwood, grandson of the Marquess of Lotbinière.

== Later career ==
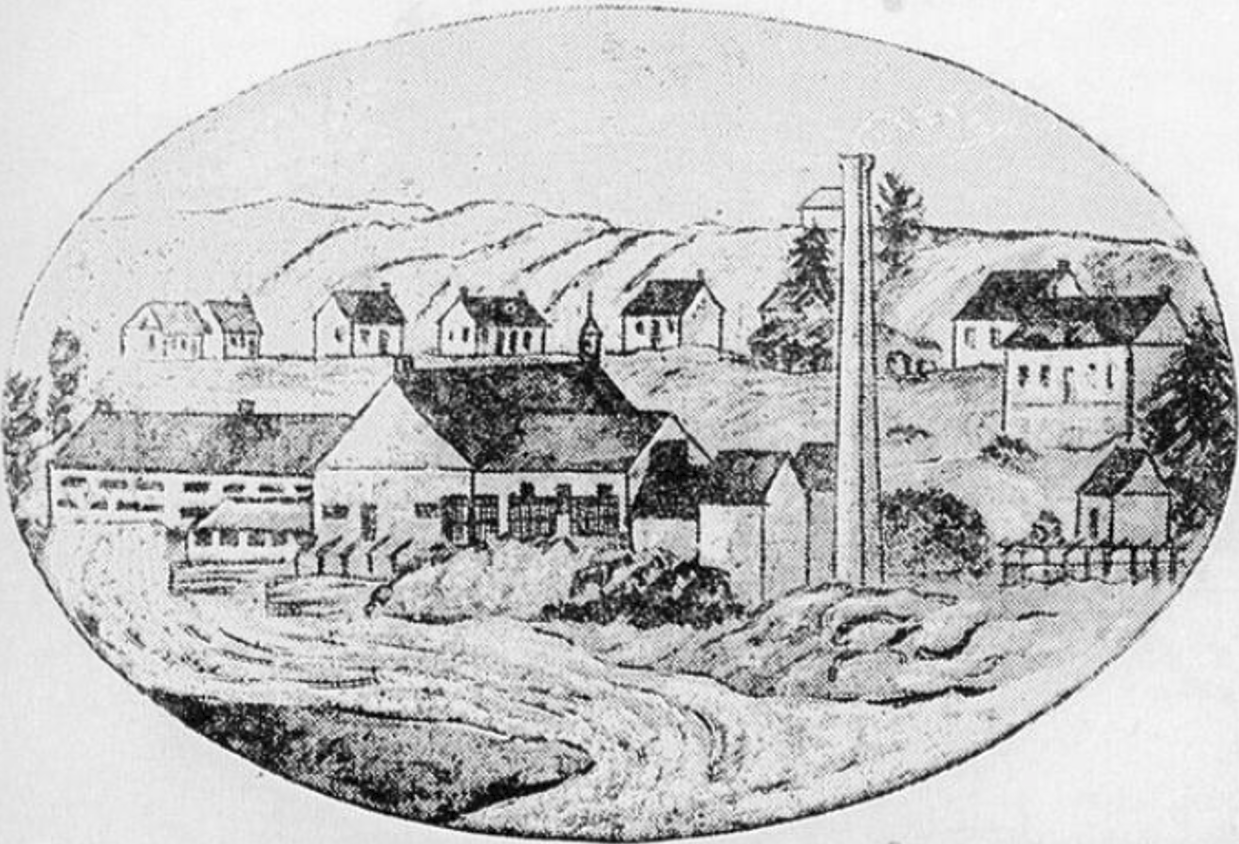
Perspective of Yaletown Village in Louiseville, Quebec and its infrastructures

In 1882, Yale founded a shoe factory named La manufacture de chaussures de la ville de Louiseville, with MP Édouard Caron, and 3 other merchants. They were in the business of manufacturing and selling shoes, with a capital stock of $25,000, and Yale was elected on its board of directors. In the same year, he was one of the three candidates to the House of Commons of Canada, trying to obtain a seat in Canada's Parliament, but was defeated by 319 votes to Frédéric Houde, a newspaper owner.

Yale later cofounded with 45 shareholders the Société de Navigation des Trois-Rivières à Montréal, a steam boat shipping company, and became its president. The new company included merchants, seamen and farmers from Rivière-du-Loup, Trois-Rivières, Saint-Léon, and Yamachiche. His uncle Andrew Yale and cousin William Yale also became agents and tanners for his enterprises, and were partners in his ventures. In 1880, Yale assisted and made a speech at the wedding of Rev. Boucher, along with Col. de Lotbinière Harwood, MP Frédéric Houde, MP François-Sévère L. Désaulniers, MP Alexis L. Desaulniers and MP Édouard Caron.

In 1882, Yale sold some factories to Marceau, which were seized by Banque Ville-Marie in 1884, and sold in March 1888, to John Heenan for $8,500. In the same year, Yaletown made a request to Bishop L. F. Laflèche to be annexed to Ste-Ursule. The demand was granted by Lt. Gov. Théodore Robitaille, who served under the Marquess of Lansdowne, Governor General of Canada and family member of Napoleon Bonaparte. Yaletown had also a post office, a shop, a school and religious center. Yale opened a third tannery at Saint-Zéphirin-de-Nicolet. In 1882, he cofounded in Montreal the East End Stock Yard and Abattoir Co. with a dozen of investors, including Honoré Beaugrand, the future mayor of Montreal. The capital stock was at $50,000.

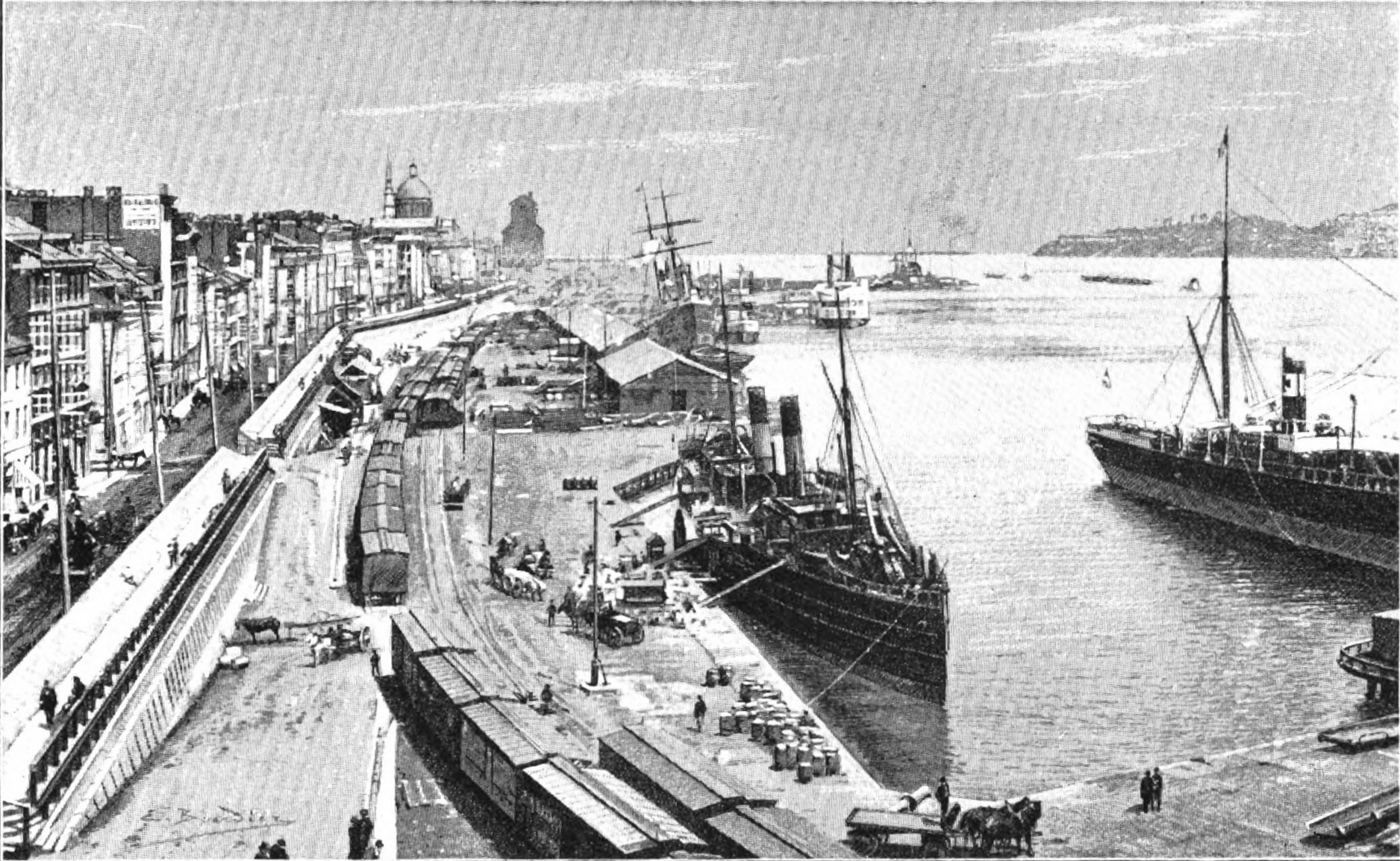
View of the Port of Montreal around 1900, close to Bonsecours Market, where Yale shipped his products

He goes bankrupt in the early 1880s, not being able to pay back his debts with Banque Ville-Marie, and by 1884, he set up a new shop with his wife Victoire and his grandson Georges Lambert, under G. H. Yale & Company. They started exporting their products to neighboring villages, downtown Montreal and to Britain. He also opened a cheese factory in Saint-Didace. Yale's waterfall was sold to Shawinigan Water & Power Company. The village grew to 150 inhabitants, with the tannery producing 20,000 leather products per year. During the summer, the products were shipped by steam boats, and during the winter, by carriages to Montreal, three times a week.

Yale's tannery was the second in industrial-scale in Canada, only surpassed by the one of Casimir and Calixte Galibert in Old Montreal, who were the first in Canada. The Galiberts were leading French wine merchants and leather manufacturers, importing their supplies from Bordeaux and Paris, with shop at 156 Saint-Paul Street, now on the site of the Old Custom House. Calixte's son, Paul Galibert, became board director of the Montreal Street Railway, Canada Steamship Lines, and the Montreal Light, Heat & Power Co. of Sir Rodolphe Forget and Sir Herbert Samuel Holt.

== Death ==
In 1891, Yale's factories burned down for a third time, bringing losses of more than $15,000, and was once again uninsured. In the same year, Maj. Yale left Louiseville to established himself permanently in Montreal. His wife died in 1892, he then remarried in 1894 to Marie Charette of Sainte-Ursule, and stayed in Montreal. Yale's house in Louiseville was tied to Hotel Mineau, and in 1895, he would rent it to Carles & Freres Co., manufacturers of wine and beer, as he was now a resident of Montreal.

Under Premier Sir Louis-Hippolyte Lafontaine, 1st Baronet, Yale was appointed Justice of the Peace on many occasions for Maskinonge County, and was described as an industrialist. Other nominees included Senator John Jones Ross, previously Premier of Quebec, and Senator Hippolyte Montplaisir.

George Henry Yale died on June 18, 1897, in Montreal. Maj. Yale was married on February 16, 1841, to Victoria Laurent, by whom he had a daughter named Marie Victoria Yale, who married to Major Francois-Xavier Lambert, also alderman of Louiseville. Their daughter, Marie-Antoinette Lambert, married to Dr. Louis A. Fortier, father of lawyer Jacob Yale Fortier.

Yale's brothers-in-law were Charles Robert, merchant tailor, and Mr. Papineau, a cabinet maker in Montreal. His nephew, politician Arthur Yale, would achieve much success in Plateau-Mount Royal, being one of its first aldermen and investors, and his great-grandson, lawyer Jacob Yale Fortier, would become proprietor of number of enterprises related to clothing, alcohol, real estate and other ventures. His grandniece was Claire Yale.
