= Claire Yale =

Canadian socialite and philanthropist (1903–1997)

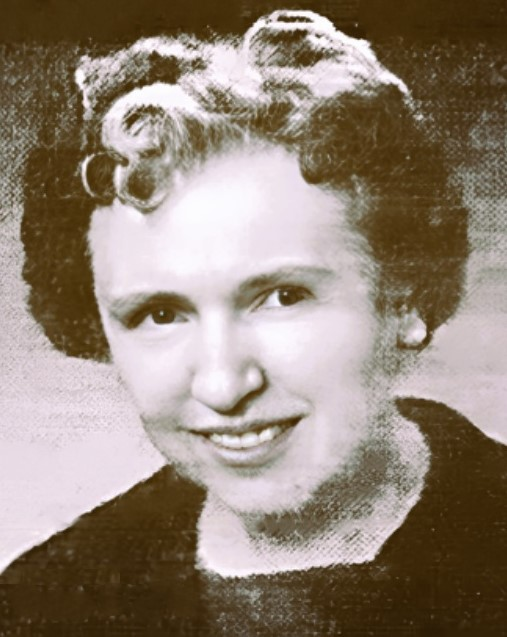
Portrait of Claire Yale, from the Sentier Ecologique Claire Yale, named in her honor in St-Eustache

Marie Claire Elizabeth Yale (1903 – 1997) was a Canadian socialite, philanthropist and founder of the Historical Society of St-Eustache. She inherited the Yale Islands from her father, politician Arthur Yale, gave land to the city, and saved the Manoir Globensky for St-Eustache's City Hall with politician Paul Gouin.

She is the namesake of Sentier écologique Claire Yale on the Yale Islands, and of the Claire-Yale award of the Société d’Histoire Régionale of Deux-Montagnes. The latter was a society she also founded, and was presided by politician Pierre de Bellefeuille.

== Biography ==
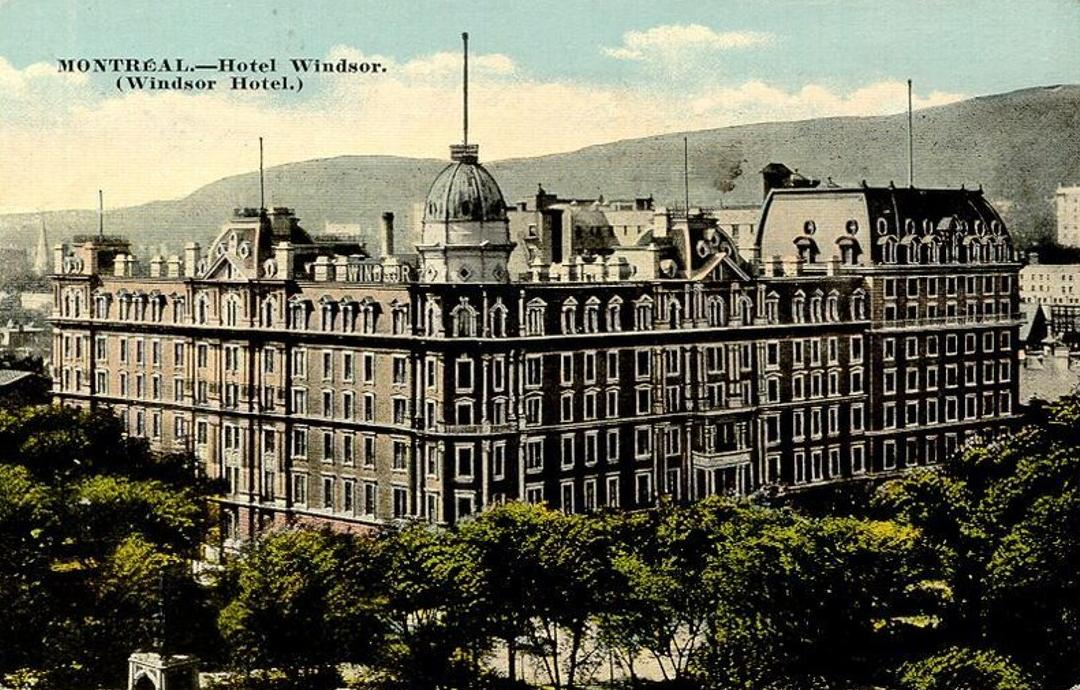
Windsor Hotel, Montreal, Canada, around 1891, was Canada's first grand hotel at the time

Claire Yale was born on July 14, 1903, to Elizabeth Lacombe and Arthur Yale, members of the Yale family. Her father was a wealthy politician of Cote-des-Neiges, and a cofounder of a neighborhood named Plateau-Mount Royal in Montreal. He made his fortune in banking, mining and real estate. Her granduncle was Major George Henry Yale, 1st Mayor of Louiseville, Quebec. He was the owner of 3 fur factories and founded the village of Yaletown. Claire Yale was educated by a private teacher at home during her youth.

At 14 years old, in 1917, she inherited the Yale Islands as sole heiress of her father, Arthur Yale, with her cousin Wilfrid, father of Dr. Pierre-Paul Yale, as one of the executors. Her brother and two sisters had died young. The property was used by the Yales as their summer home. She later married her chauffeur, Joseph Hormisdas Lacourse, in September, 1924, whom she divorced 4 months later on the basis of adultery.

She lived initially in the mansion built by her father in 1905, which would be burned down by criminals, along with its art collection. She then built a smaller home, which had an indoor pool, a 5 car garage, 4 fireplaces, a servant house, and a few other facilities. In 1924, she was aboard the RMS Andania of the Cunard Line for a sailing trip from Halifax to Quebec City, and then to France and Italy.

Notable guests included Sir Francis Alexander Macnaghten, General Frank S. Meighen of the 87th Battalion, cofounder of the Opera de Montreal, Col. Ogilvie of Ogilvy & Sons, Lt. Col. K. C. Laurie, son of General John W. Laurie, and a few members of the Henry Morgan & Company, seated at the Henry Morgan Building.

Yale became a member of the Circle of Epicurans along with the Marquise de Ruzé d'Effiat, Montreal mayor Jean Drapeau and actress Nicole Germain. She was a guest in 1926 with other French-Canadians at the Windsor Hotel, along with Senator John Webster and politician Wilfrid Girouard.

In 1938, she became a member of the literary club named Cercle Tricolore, and was present at their first reunion at the Berkley Hotel in the Golden Square Mile, along with Russian Princess G. Kassatkin, of the House of Kossatkin, Mrs. the Baroness d'Halewyn, Mrs. Gouin, wife of Senator Léon Mercier Gouin, Lt. Col. Filiatrault, and a few others. She was also a member of the club during their second season under Baroness d'Hérail de Brisis, the club's vice-president.

== Later life ==
The historical building saved by Claire Yale, Manoir Globensky, was used as St-Eustache's City Hall

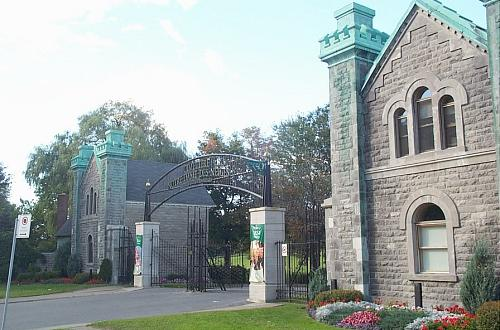
Notre Dame des Neiges Cemetery, Montreal, where Claire Yale was buried along with her father, Arthur Yale

Yale was a member of the Club 55, and attended their gala at the Ritz-Carlton Hotel of Montreal in 1950, with the guests of honor being Ernest Triat, Consul General of France, and Guy de Berg, General manager of the Compagnie Générale Transatlantique of the Pereire brothers, business rivals of the Rothschilds. Among the 55 members were Senator Thomas Vien, Secretary Hector Perrier, Rector Mgr Olivier Maurault and number of doctors.

In 1960, she was among the guests invited by the Women Chamber of Commerce of Montreal for a dinner with the past First Lady of the United States, Eleanor D. Roosevelt, wife of President Franklin D. Roosevelt. Others guests included Louis de Gaspé Beaubien, Lucie de Vienne, private secretary to Charles de Gaulle, President of France, and artist Jeanine Beaubien, granddaughter of Judge Napoléon Charbonneau.

Claire Yale was the founder of the Historical Society of St-Eustache in 1961. She founded the society to save a historical monument, the Manoir Globensky, the former estate of Lord Charles-Auguste-Maximilien Globensky. She reached directly to politician Paul Gouin, son of Sir Lomer Gouin, Premier of Quebec. She obtained grants for the city and the monument became the City Hall of St-Eustache from 1961 to 1986. Other projects of her society included the creation of the St-Eustache museum, preserving the historical St-Eustache neighborhood, saving a local school in Deux-Montagne and the Légaré Mill.

She also cofounded a real estate investment company with her cousins, lawyer Alfred Cinq-mars of Outremont and entrepreneur Wilfrid Yale of Mount-Royal, named the Compagnie des Terrains Champlain Lté. She lived on the Yale Islands and in Cote-des-Neiges throughout her life. She gave about three acres of land to the city to create a public park for its citizens, and the path was named the Claire Yale Ecological Path in her honor.

She is the namesake of the Claire-Yale award, given by the Société d’Histoire Régionale of Deux-Montagnes, a society she also founded, and which was presided by politician Pierre de Bellefeuille. The awards are given to foster and recognize the efforts of citizens who worked at preserving heritage properties. The Claire Yale award is in association with Quebec's government department named the Conseil du monument et des sites du Québec.

Yale died on December 16, 1997, at Hôpital du Sacré-Cœur de Montréal, and was buried at Notre Dame des Neiges Cemetery. With Joseph Hormidas Lacourse, she was the mother of John Yale, born Jean-Paul, who became a British artist and member of the Royal Society of British Artists in London, England. Her godsons were Pierre-Paul Yale and Jean-Francois Yale of Mount-Royal, sons of Wilfrid Yale, professor and director of the civil engineering department at Collège Ahuntsic.. Her goddaughter was Barbara Vokral.
