= Harold Maguire =

Royal Air Force Air Marshal (1912-2001)

Sir Harold Maguire
- Born: 12 April 1912; Kilkishen, Ireland
- Died: 1 February 2001 (aged 88)
- Military career
- Allegiance: United Kingdom
- Branch: Royal Air Force
- Service years: 1933–1968
- Rank: Air Marshal
- Commands: No. 11 Group (1961–62); No. 13 Group (1959–60); RAF Odiham (1950–52); RAF Linton-on-Ouse (1946–47); No. 226 Wing (1941–42); No. 229 Squadron (1939–40)
- Conflicts: Second World War: Battle of Britain; Battle of Java
- Awards: Knight Commander of the Order of the Bath; Distinguished Service Order; Officer of the Order of the British Empire; Mentioned in Despatches (3)
- Other work: Director-General of Intelligence (1968–72)

Air Marshal Sir Harold John Maguire, KCB, DSO, OBE (12 April 1912 – 1 February 2001) was a senior Royal Air Force officer and public servant. He was Director-General of Intelligence at the Ministry of Defence from 1968 to 1972.

== RAF career ==
Harold Maguire was born in Kilkishen in County Clare, Ireland. Educated at Wesley College, Dublin and Trinity College Dublin, Maguire joined the Royal Air Force in 1933. He served in the Second World War as officer commanding No. 229 Squadron and then as officer commanding No. 226 Wing based in Sumatra. He was awarded the Distinguished Service Order in 1946 for the gallant example he had set to his fellow captives while he was a prisoner of war during the Japanese invasions of Sumatra and Java in 1942.

After the war Maguire became station commander at RAF Linton-on-Ouse and then group captain, operations at RAF Fighter Command. He was appointed an Officer of the Order of the British Empire and made station commander at RAF Odiham in 1950, became senior air staff officer at AHQ Malta in 1952 and director of tactical and air transport operations in 1956. Appointed a Companion of the Order of the Bath in 1958, he went on to be senior air staff officer at Headquarters No. 11 Group later that year, air officer commanding No. 13 Group in 1959 and air officer commanding No. 11 Group in 1961. After that he was made senior air staff officer at Headquarters Far East Air Force in 1962, Assistant Chief of the Air Staff (Intelligence) in 1964 and Deputy Chief of the Defence Staff (Intelligence) in 1965 before retiring in 1968. He had been knighted as a Knight Commander of the Order of the Bath in 1966.

In 1959 Maguire, by now an air vice-marshal, was forced to land a Spitfire on a cricket pitch in Bromley only 10 minutes after flying over Whitehall in a display commemorating the Battle of Britain. As his engine failed, he spotted the company sports ground of Oxo and managed to put the aircraft down on the square, breaking the stumps at one end while the teams were off having tea.

In retirement Maguire was director-general of intelligence at the Ministry of Defence from 1968 to 1972.

== Family ==
In 1940 he married Mary Elisabeth Wild; they had a son and a daughter.

Military offices
Preceded by Sir Norman Denning	Deputy Chief of Defence Staff (Intelligence); 1965–1968	Succeeded by Sir Richard Fyffe
Preceded by Alick Foord-Kelcey	Assistant Chief of the Air Staff (Intelligence); 1964–1965	Post disbanded
Preceded by Alick Foord-Kelcey	Air Officer Commanding No. 11 Group; 1961–1962	Succeeded by Gareth Clayton
Preceded by Alfred Earle	Air Officer Commanding No. 13 Group; 1959–1960	Command disbanded
Government offices
Preceded by Sir Alfred Earle	Director-General Intelligence; 1968–1972	Succeeded by Sir Louis Le Bailly
