= James Murray Yale =

Canadian merchant (1798–1871)

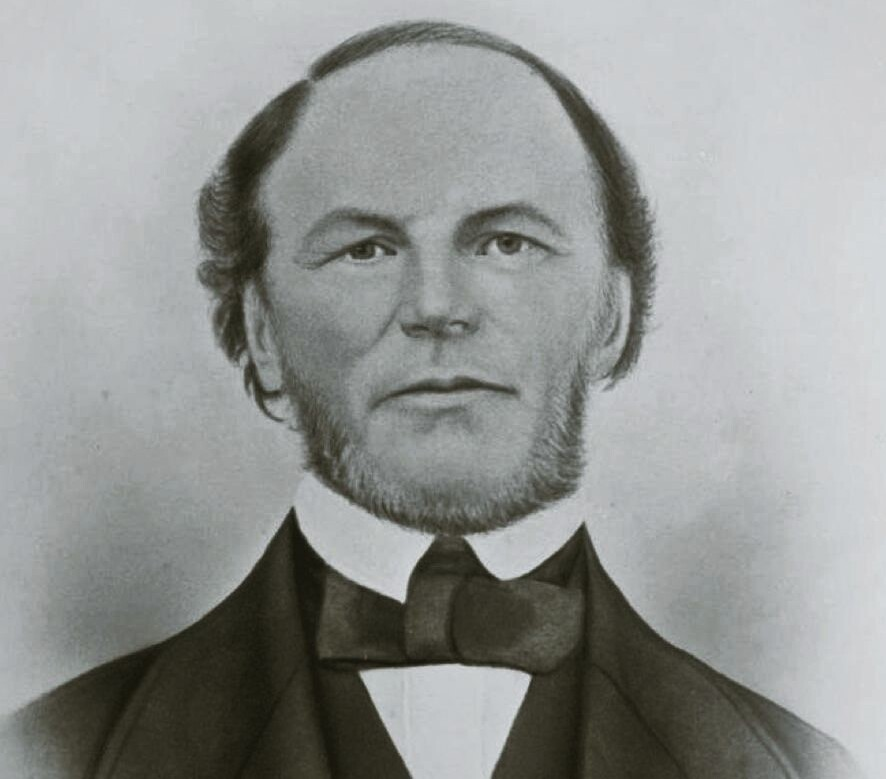
- Born: c. 1798; Lachine, Quebec, Lower Canada
- Died: 7 May 1871 (aged 72–73); Saanich, Colony of British Columbia
- Occupations: Chief trader, Clerk
- Spouse: Unknown
- Children: 3
- Family: Yale

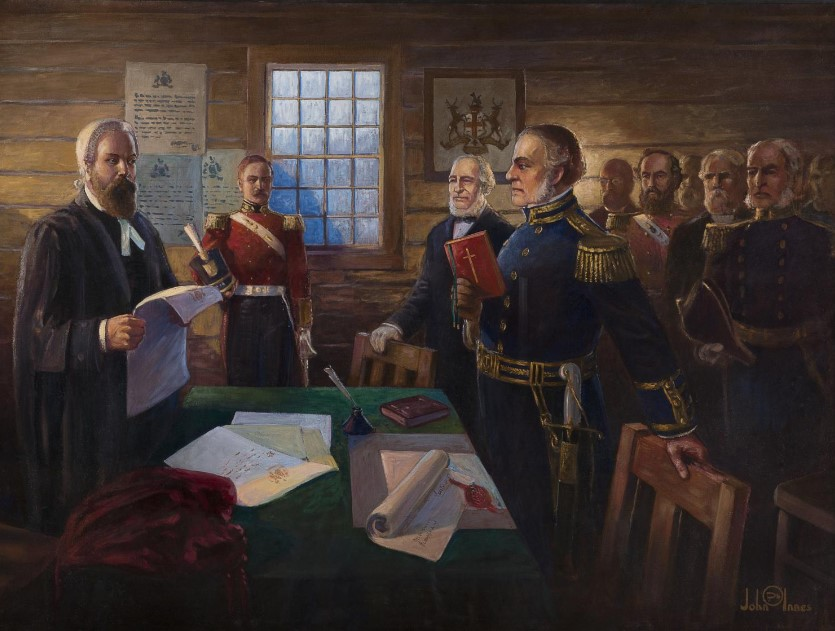
The creation of the Colony of British Columbia in 1858, at Fort Langley, with Yale as Commander of the Fort, and Sir James Douglas as first Governor

James Murray Yale (c. 1798 – 7 May 1871) was a chief trader for the Hudson's Bay Company during the late North American fur trade, as they were competing with the Montreal-based North West Company and the American Fur Company of John Jacob Astor. During his career, he would negotiate and compete with Americans, French Canadians, Russians, and Indians for market shares. He is best remembered for having given his name to Fort Yale, British Columbia, which became the city of Yale during the gold rush, and later on, became the name of the Yaletown district of downtown Vancouver.

Yale also became Chief Factor of the Columbia District, opposing Astor's Pacific Fur Company and NWC's dominance along the Columbia department, including the Pacific Northwest and Oregon Country. Notably, the Colony of British Columbia was created at his fort in 1858, with Sir James Douglas elected as first Governor, and the fort as capital.

== Biography ==
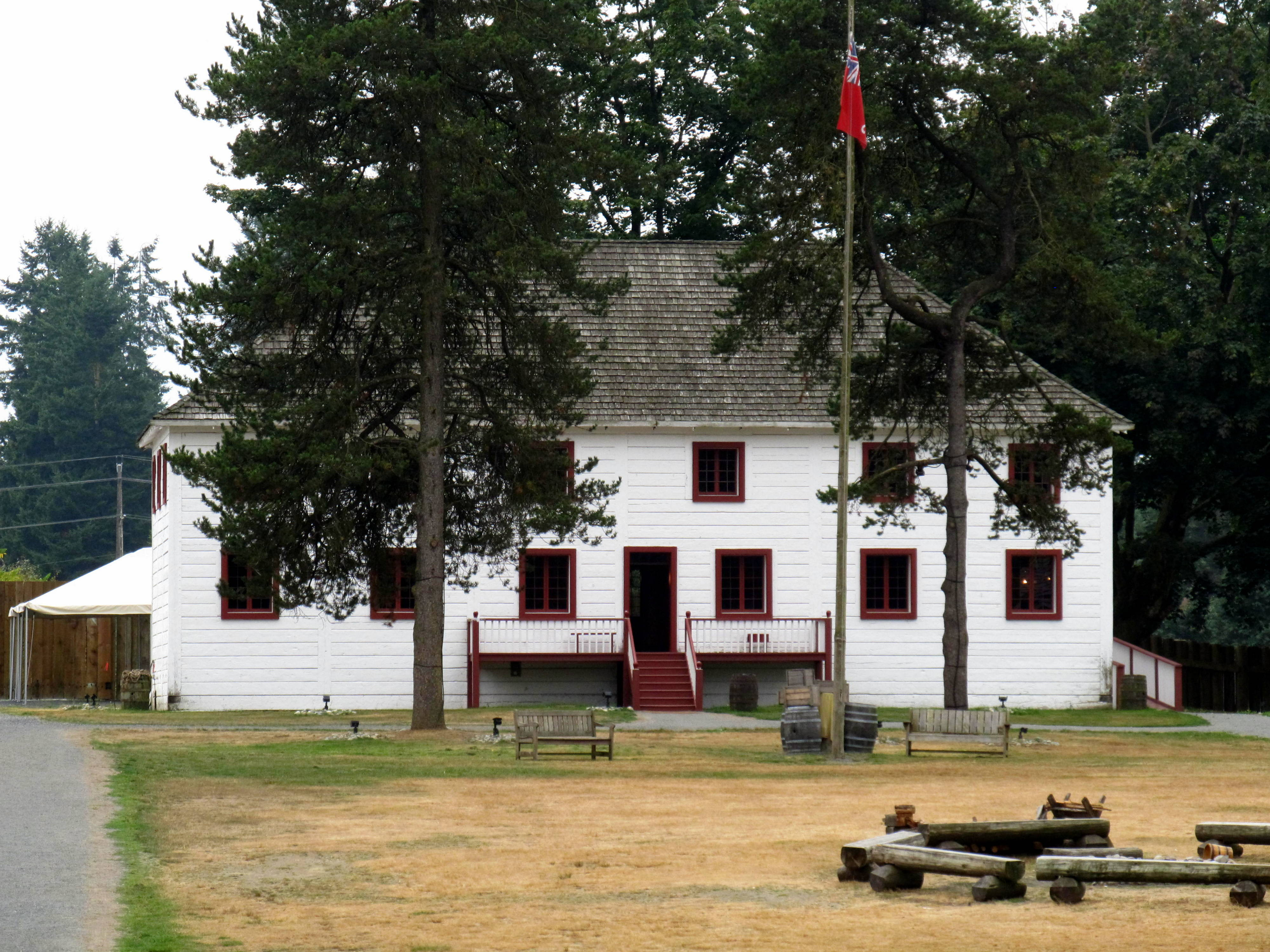
The residence of Yale as commander of Fort Langley called the Big House. The house is a reconstruction of how it would have appeared in the 1830s

James Murray Yale was born in 1798 in Lachine, Quebec, a borough of the city of Montreal, to Sarah Andrews and Theophilus Yale, grandson of Connecticut magistrate Theophilus Yale, member of the Yale family. The area was previously known as Lower Canada, and historically belonged to Nouvelle-France. His uncle was bayonet manufacturer Elihu Yale, and his cousins included New York newspaper magnate Moses Yale Beach, sea Captain Theophilus Yale, and Boston sailmaker Rufus M. Yale.

His father came from a seafaring family, and was a tenant of the Seigneur of Argenteuil James Murray, and died when he was young, drowning in North River, Newfoundland. Yale's mother then abandoned him and left for Scotland. Yale and his siblings were raised by Lord Murray, who was the grandnephew of the first Governor of Quebec, James Murray, and the illegitimate grandson of George Murray, 6th Lord Elibank. Murray's friend, Colin Robertson, a former fur trader of the North West Co., initiated Yale to the fur trade, through his connections with the board of directors of the Hudson's Bay Company in London.

Therefore, in 1815, Yale joined the HBC expedition to Lake Athabasca, led by Robertson and John Clarke. The latter was a relative and partner of John Jacob Astor, who had been forced to sell his shares of the Pacific Fur Co. at Fort Astoria after the War of 1812. The Athabasca brigade consisted of two partners, 18 clerks, 140 voyageurs, 7 native hunters and 20 canoes. Their intention was to take market shares from the North West Company, but on their way, with Clarke heading the expedition, the NWC men took the opportunity to cut off their supplies during the winter, causing the deliberate death of 15 HBC men by starvation.

On April 1817, as the rivalry intensified, Yale was kidnapped by the NWC men and taken as a prisoner to Tideè lake for five months. Then, in 1821, he was moved to New Caledonia and put in charge of Fort Astoria by the HBC, renamed Fort George in honor of King George III, until 1824. During his tenure there, he would narrowly escape death, as during his absence, the Fort was attacked, and his men, murdered by the Indians.

"No, do not try to hurt the Sky-people; you can not kill them because they are supernatural. They come from the sky. There are as many of them as the stars. If you try to kill them, more will come and they will kill us all. You saw how they took fire into their stomachs and were not burned; you saw the thunder-stick. No, you must not do what you plan."
– The entry in Fort Langley: Outpost of Empire, by Chief Whattlekainuma, a sub-chief of the Kwantlen First Nation (Halkomelem: qʼʷa:n̓ƛʼən̓), referring to the fur traders as Sky-people

In 1826, he is recorded as a correspondent of fur trader John Stuart, uncle of Lord Strathcona & Mount Royal of Knebworth House. Yale then served at Fort Alexandria and Fort St. James. When he was unwell in 1827, he was sent to Fort Vancouver where medical care was provided to him. Later in that year, Yale accompanied Gov. George Simpson on his exploratory trip down the Fraser River. At the end of the journey, he remained in Fort Langley, where he worked as a clerk under Chief James McMillan. McMillan was one of those who took part in the acquisition by the HBC of Fort Astoria and Fort Okanogan; forts that belonged to their competitor John Jacob Astor and his Pacific Fur Company. Astor initial plan was to create a fur monopoly in the Columbia District by allying himself with the North West Company, who were qualified as "Lords of the fur trade" in Montreal, but they had refused the offer, as they were able to challenge the monopoly of the HBC by themselves.

== Chief trader ==
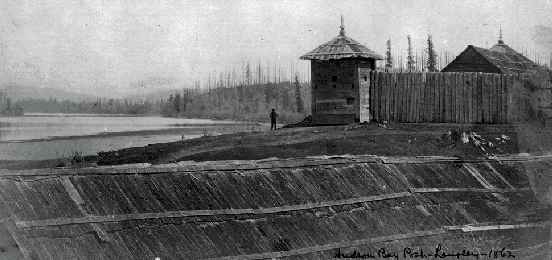
Fort Langley, British Columbia, main trading post of Yale's merchant business career

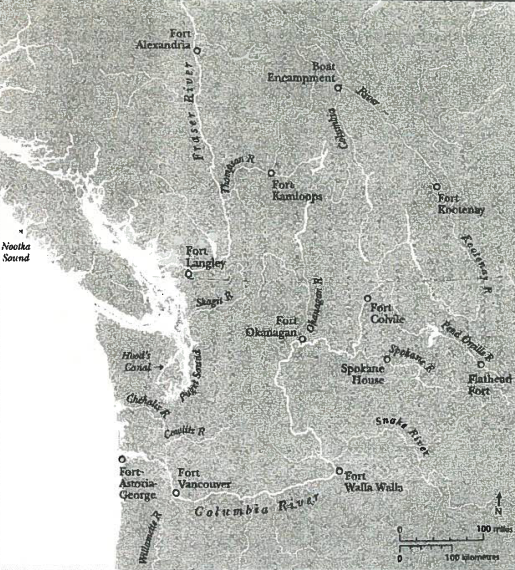
Fort Langley is on the mid left, at the entrance of the Fraser River, while Fort Astoria is at the bottom left, entrance of the Columbia River

Yale then replaced Deputy Governor Archibald McDonald, husband of Princess Raven, the daughter of King Comcomly, a native Indian, as Chief trader on February 20, 1833. As a Chief trader, after the merger of the HBC and the Montreal based North West Company, he now had a share of the profits of the Hudson's Bay company during the monopoly years, which were distributed among the 25 Chief factors, the 28 Chief traders and the shareholders in London. He achieved great success at Fort Langley, dealing in furs and pelts with the Indians, manufacturing wood barrels, and exporting cured salmons, which commanded high prices during the Crimean War of Napoleon III.

During his tenure, Yale would be saved by his postmaster from another murder attempt on his life, this time, by Tzouhalem, the chief of the Cowichan tribes. Later, an accident would cause the Fort to burn down. The Fort would be rebuilt thereafter by Yale and his men with the help of Sir James Douglas. It became one of the largest forts ever built by the Hudson's Bay Company and Yale became its commander. While Yale was building his new fort, Sir George Simpson was at Hamburg, Germany, discussing with Baron Ferdinand von Wrangel, Governor of Russian America and Minister of the Navy. The Baron was the representative of the Russian-American Company, a fur trading enterprise chartered by Tsar Paul I of Russia, son of Catherine the Great.

The discussions evolved into an agreement for the HBC, and they obainted a lease for a part of Alaska, which belonged to Russia at the time. The aim of that lease was to block the American fur traders from dealing with the Russian trading posts in Alaskan territory and have them deal with the Hudson's Bay Company instead, thus increasing the trade volume at Fort Langley for Yale. They started making caviar, as the recipe for making this delicacy was part of the deal obtained from Russia. The salmon trade would eventually become a world-trade industry for the Fort and the area, developed by him and chief trader Archibald McDonald.

Disputes with the chief factor of Fort Vancouver, John McLoughlin, a French-Canadian, were frequent, as Fort Langley was second only in importance after his Fort, and resources were scarce. Eventually, the fur returns were on the decline and the shareholders in London were alerted, as a new technology made its apparition, the steamer Beaver. Steamships allowed for longer distance travel and lowered the need for a Fort to store the merchandise. It became in itself a sort of mobile trading post rather than a fixed infrastructure, thus accelerating the speed of trade. They suffered even more with the erection of Fort Victoria (British Columbia) in 1843, which would displace them as one of the main headquarters of the HBC. Governor Simpson didn't see Fort Langley suitable enough for a main depot, but acknowledged the impact it had on blocking the American fur traders from Boston and taking their market shares, as they used to control much of the Maritime fur trade. For the first ten years, the Fort produced 14,651 beaver skins, including 10,330 who were large prime pelts. Yale also developed during his tenure much of the largest farms of what is now called British Columbia, exporting products as far as Hawaii and Alaska.

== Gold rush ==
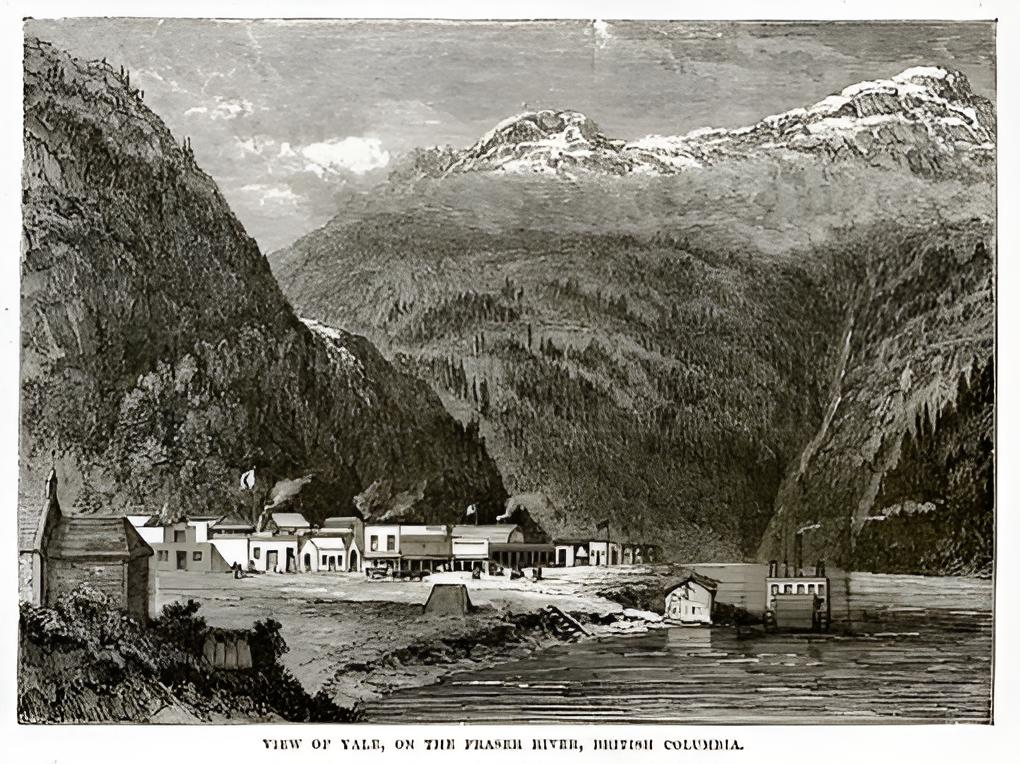
Fort Yale, gold rush era Fort that evolved into the city of Yale

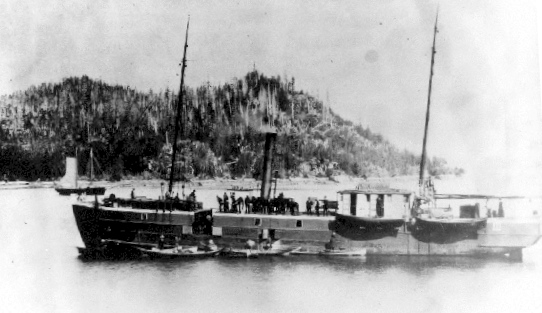
Otter steamship, successor of the Beaver steamship, used during the gold rush era near Fort Langley, and changed the economics of the fur trade

During the gold rush era, gold reserves were found near the area of Fort Langley, of which Yale was the commander. He sent his associate Allard to build a new fort that he named Fort Yale. A wagon road was built named Old Yale Road and was used to move men and supplies to the gold mines. The city of Yale, British Columbia, became one of the biggest city in the region west of Chicago and all the way to the north of San Francisco, due to its positioning. They initially didn't want to participate in the gold rush as they anticipated future conflicts and wars with the Indians.

With unwelcomed foreigners and speculators coming in for the gold rush, the relationships established with the Indians and the supply chains were seriously disturbed. Thousands came from San Francisco after hearing the story that the HBC had shipped away 110 pounds of gold. With the prospect of wealth, the population of the United States territory of Washington and Oregon, as well as Europeans and other Indians tribes, were excited and came by all means of travel. The HBC would start using the Beaver steamship and the Otter steamship to serve the gold industry.

With the arrival of the Fraser Canyon Gold Rush, the Fraser Canyon War and the McGowan War started. It didn't take long for a white woman to be captured and held prisoner by the Indians. Yale sent 45 men with muskets and revolvers to rescue her. Royal Engineers troops of the British Army were sent, and a need for a new colony with a better legal structure was felt by the HBC and others. This would lead to the creation of British Columbia. The act of creation was made at Fort Langley, who would stay, for a time, the provisional colonial capital of the Royal colony of British Columbia.

Chief factor Douglas would announce the formation of the colony to the Secretary of State, Lord Edward Bulwer Lytton, in company of Admiral Robert Lambert Baynes, Chief Justice David Cameron, and Judge Matthew Baillie Begbie. Many administrative positions were created to better handle the gold rush and the monopoly agreement with the Hudson's Bay Company was revoked. Having worked so hard at building the trading operations at Fort Langley for the last 30 years, and seeing the HBC being displaced by the British, Yale decided he had enough and took his retirement.

He returned for a brief time to Montreal, Canada, the area where he was born. He then later came back to Vancouver Island and bought land near his old friends of the HBC in Victoria, British Columbia, and resided there thereafter. He never returned to Fort Langley. In its heyday, the fort consisted of assistant traders, blacksmiths, boat builders, baril makers, carpenters, coopers, interpreters, laborers, and middlemen.

== Family ==
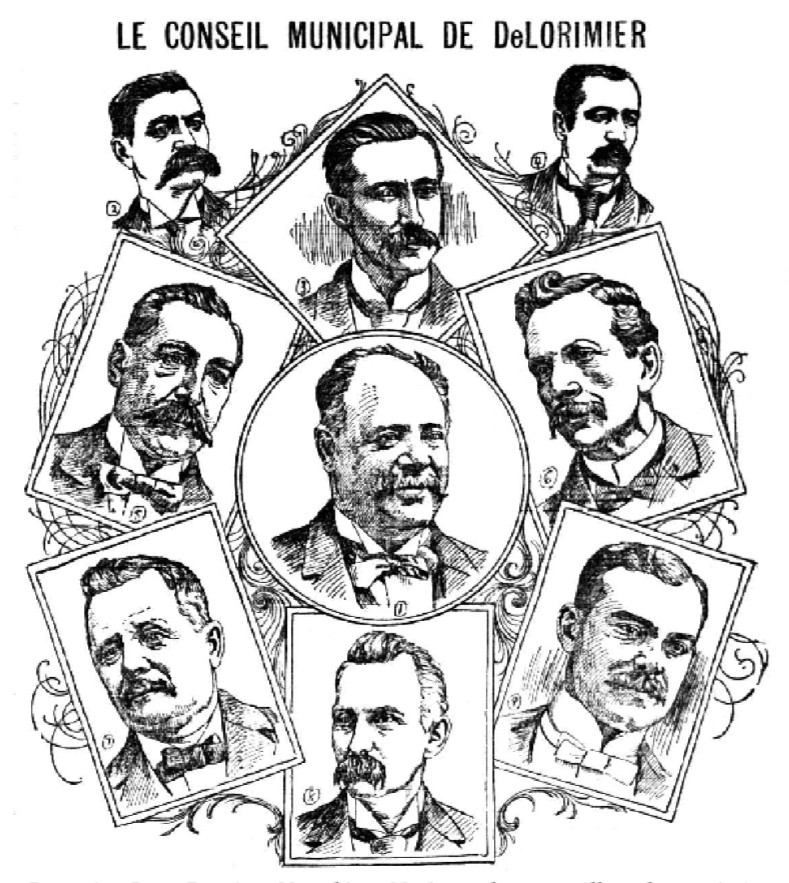
Arthur Yale, town council members at the incorporation of "DeLorimier", 1895, later Plateau-Mount Royal

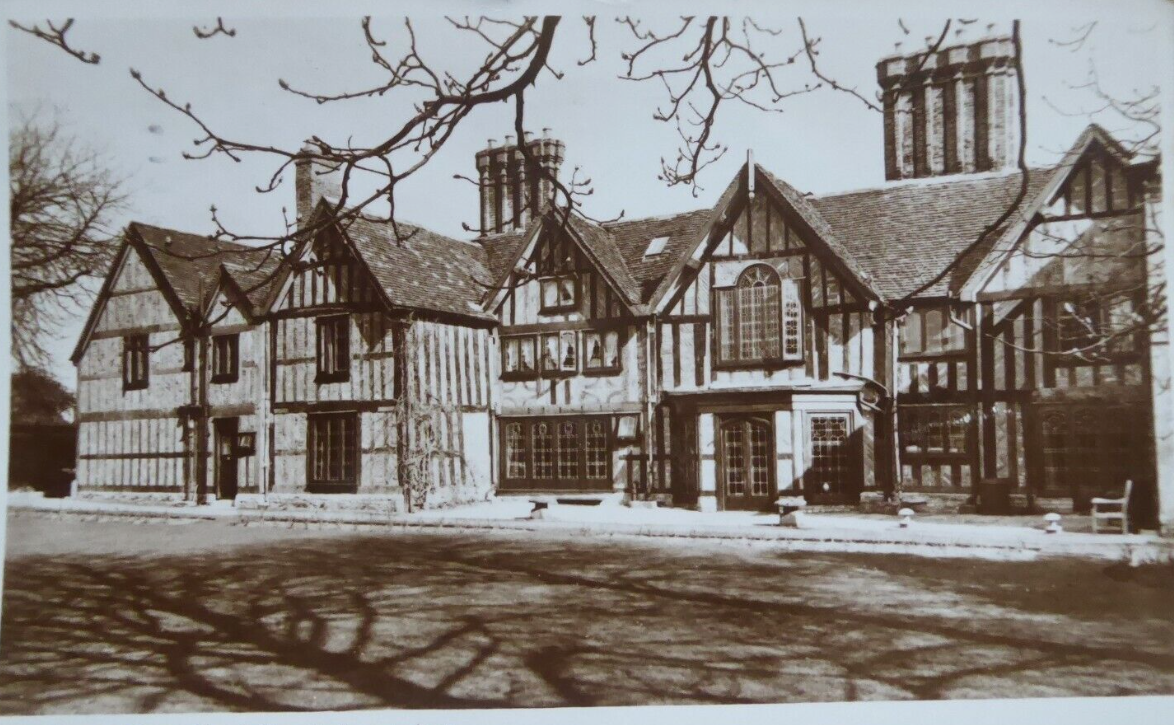
Alveston Manor, ancient seat of the Peers family of Henry Newsham Peers, was sold by his great-grandfather

Yale married a local Princess (Halkomelem: qʼʷa:n̓ƛʼən̓) named Quaitlin, daughter of the Chief of Kwantlen Nation. He was also later married to two other women. He had three daughters.

- Eliza Yale (1829–1865), married Henry Newsham Peers, Chief trader for the HBC, and Captain during the American Indian Wars for Isaac Stevens, 1st Governor of Washington. His grandfather was a French noble Count named Julianus Petrus de Linnée, while his cousin, Thomas, was married to the daughter of Admiral Kenelm Somerville, 17th Lord Somerville, of Drum House in Scotland.
- Aurelia Yale (1839–1931), married trader John D. Manson, son of Scottish chief trader Donald Manson and Félicité Lucier, daughter of fur trader Étienne Lucier, an early founder of Fort Astoria for John Jacob Astor. Manson's brother-in-law was the nephew of the Premier of Canada East, Charles R. Ogden
- Isabella Yale (1840–1927), married Chief trader George S. Simpson, son of Sir George Simpson, Governor of the Hudson's Bay Company, member of the Scottish noble Clan Mackenzie, and descendant of both Lord Duncan Forbes and Earl George Mackenzie.

The couple's wedding was organized by Sir James Douglas, 1st Governor of British Columbia, who was a nephew of Gen. Neil Douglas, Gov. of Edinburgh Castle. Sir George Simpson was the most important man in the North American fur trade at the time, and was a board director and shareholder of Canada's first bank, the Bank of Montreal, Montreal's first railroad named the Montreal and Lachine Railroad, as well as many other banks, railroads, and corporations, including the Montreal Ocean Steamship Company of Sir Hugh Allan of Ravenscrag.

Simpson was also a member of the Beaver Club, and did business with Canada's richest man Sir Hugh Allan, Sir John Rose, Sir Alexander Mackenzie, President David Torrance, minister Luther H. Holton, Senator George Crawford, Senator Thomas Ryan, banker John Redpath, and bankers John Molson and William Molson. At his death in 1860, he left an estate worth over £100,000, which in relation to GDP, amounted to half a billion dollars in 2023 Canadian money, or the equivalent building cost of an estate like Harlaxton Manor in England.

=== Members ===
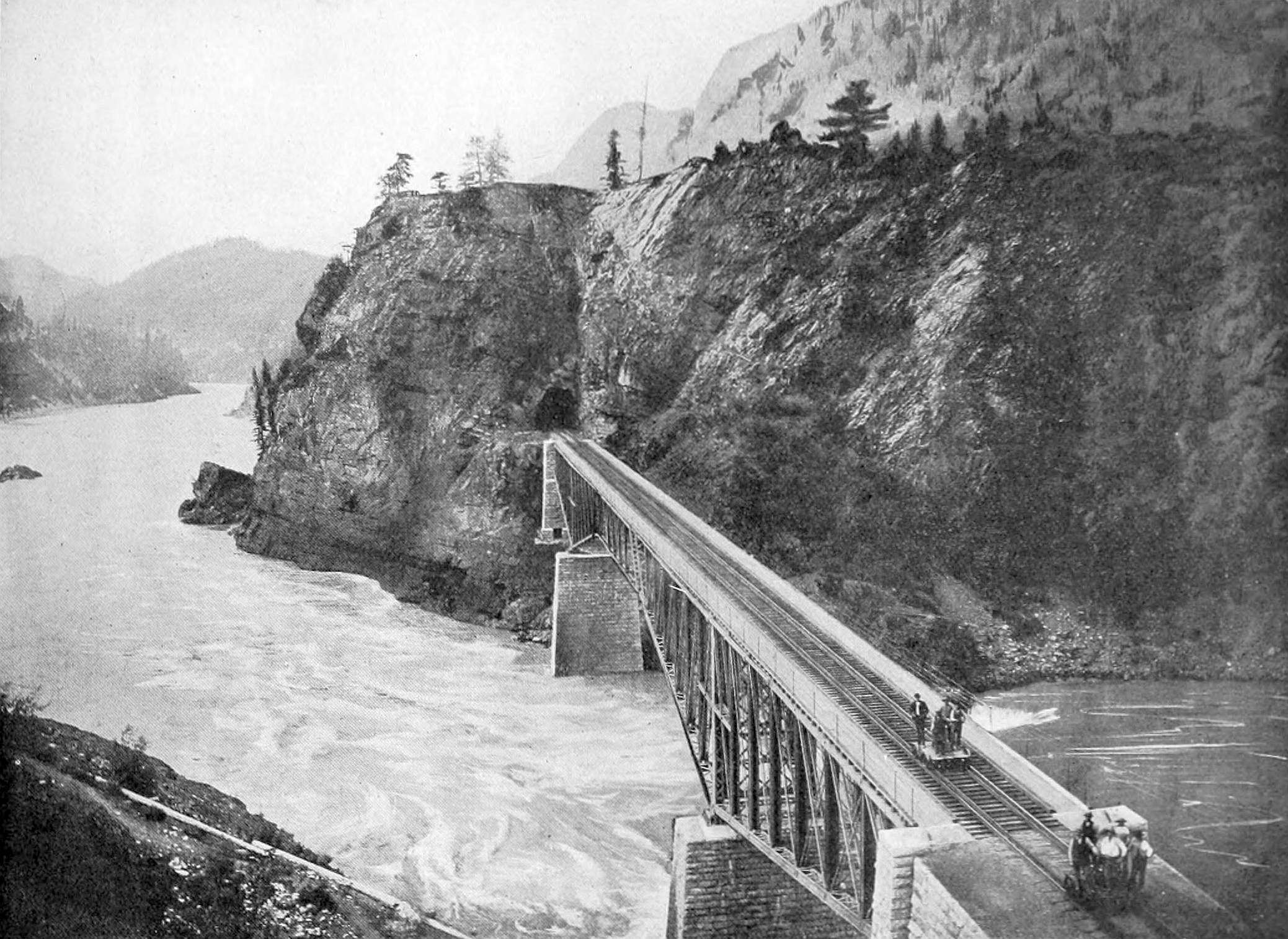
Fraser River exploration by Yale and Sir George Simpson, his in-law

Other members of the Yale family were merchants as well, such as his brother, Andrew Yale, a manufacturer of ships and barges in Montreal, and another brother, Miles Yale, who owned tanneries close to the city's port. Andrew's son was Postmaster, and number of his grandchildren lived in Outremont, Montreal, with one cofounding a Quebec mining company with $150,000 in capital.

James Murray Yale's nephews included industrialist George Henry Yale of Louiseville, along with Edward J. Yale, a jewelry manufacturer and inventor in Rhode Island, Manhattan, and Chicago, in partnership with banker Frederick A. Ballou of the Rhode Island Hospital Trust. A grandnephew, Joseph Yale Blake, was the father-in-law of druggist Kenneth B. Dalby, son of the Mayor of Victoria, William Dalby.

Another grandnephew, Arthur Yale, was magistrate of Côte-des-Neiges in Montreal, cofounder of Plateau-Mount Royal, and one of the largest shareholders of the Provincial Bank of Canada, now the National Bank of Canada. His daughter Claire Yale, a socialite, inherited the Yale Islands in Saint-Eustache, Quebec on Rivière des Mille Îles, and became the mother of British artist John Yale, and godmother of Dr. Pierre-Paul Yale.

James Muray Yale's cousin, Mary Victoria Yale (1847), married to Major Commander Francois Xavier Lambert, a merchant-tanner, and one of their son became lieutenant and a daughter married to Mayor Louis A. Fortier, a Justice of the Peace, Physician and Surgeon from Mcgill University. They became the parents of King's Counsel Jacob Yale Fortier, a wealthy businessman from Montreal. Yale was also a second cousin of Connecticut merchant William Yale, a third cousin of Americans Linus Yale Sr. and Linus Yale Jr. of the Yale Lock Company, and a distant cousin of New York artist James Carroll Beckwith, member of the Social Register.

== Legacy ==
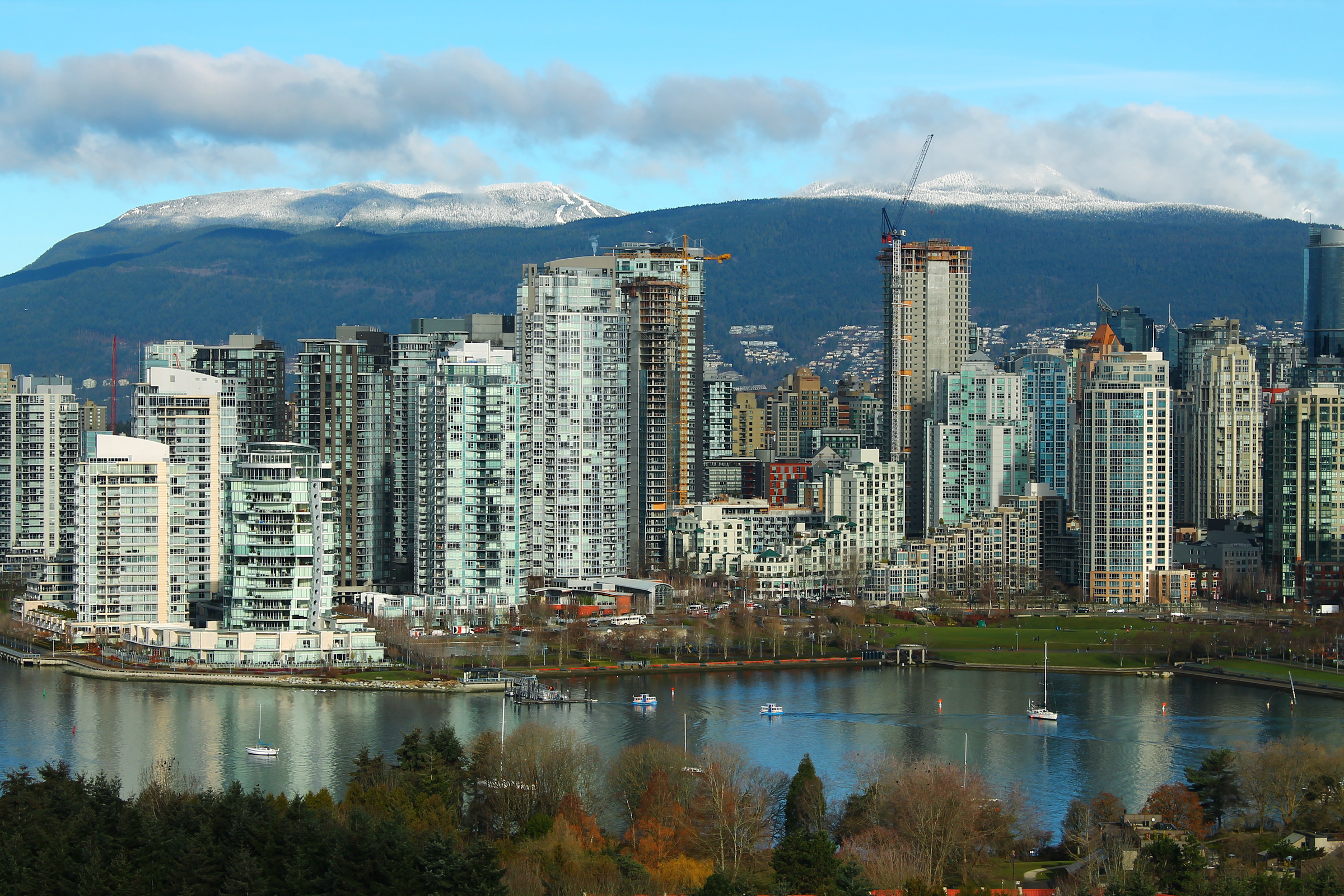
View of Yaletown

When the city of Yale, British Columbia was founded in 1848, it was named after James Murray Yale. First as Fort Yale, then as Yale, which eventually gave its name to the Yaletown district of Downtown Vancouver.

James was a distant cousin of Gov. Elihu Yale, founder and benefactor of Yale University, being a descendant of his uncle, Capt. Thomas Yale, stepson of Gov. Theophilus Eaton. Capt. Thomas Yale was a merchant and landowner, one of the founders of New Haven Colony, Connecticut, and the American ancestor of the Yale family. His uncle was Nathaniel Eaton, first head of Harvard, and his half-brother was Samuel Eaton, one of the seven founders of the Harvard Corporation, now the oldest corporation in America.

Yale was known as "Little Yale" because of his short stature about which he was sensitive. Chief Factor Sir James Douglas, Governor of the Colony of British Columbia, his superior in the HBC, a big man, took a quiet delight in standing near Yale and observing his discomfiture. In his famous "Character Book", Governor Simpson devoted an entry to Yale:

"A sharp active well conducted very little man but full of fire with the courage of a Lion. Deficient in Education, but has a good deal of address & Management with Indians and notwithstanding his diminutive size is more feared and respected than some of our 6 feet men.""
– The entry in the Dictionary of Canadian Biography, Volume X
