= Rufus M. Yale =

Sailmaker from Boston

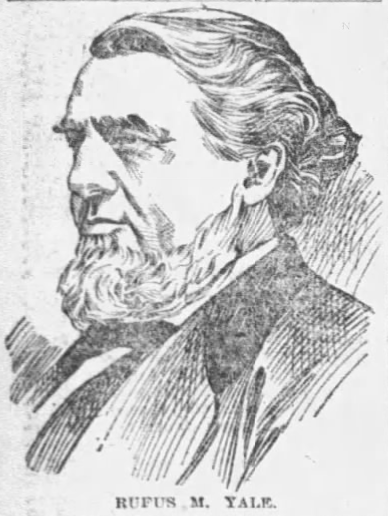
Rufus M. Yale, sailmaker in Boston

Rufus Mitchell Yale (1822 – 1899) was a prominent Boston businessman and military officer. He was a pioneer in the development of Malden, Massachusetts, and a leading sailmaker in New England under R. M. Yale & Co., established in 1847. He was also a Sergeant under the Artillery Company of Massachusetts and a member of the Freemasons of Boston.

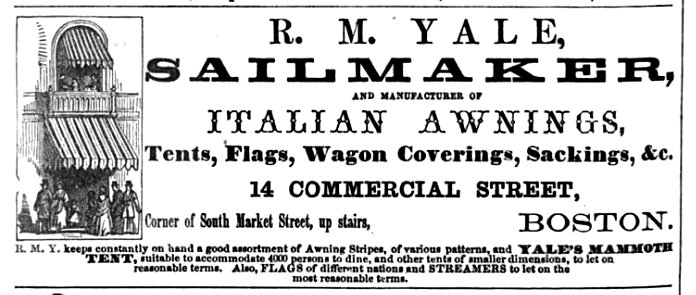
Yale Sailmaker advertisement, 14 Commercial St, Boston Directory, 1861

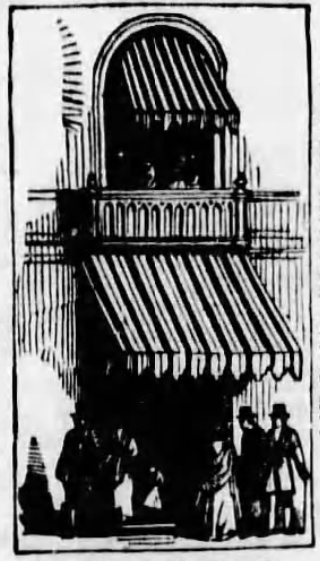
R. M. Yale & Co., entrance, Boston, 1859

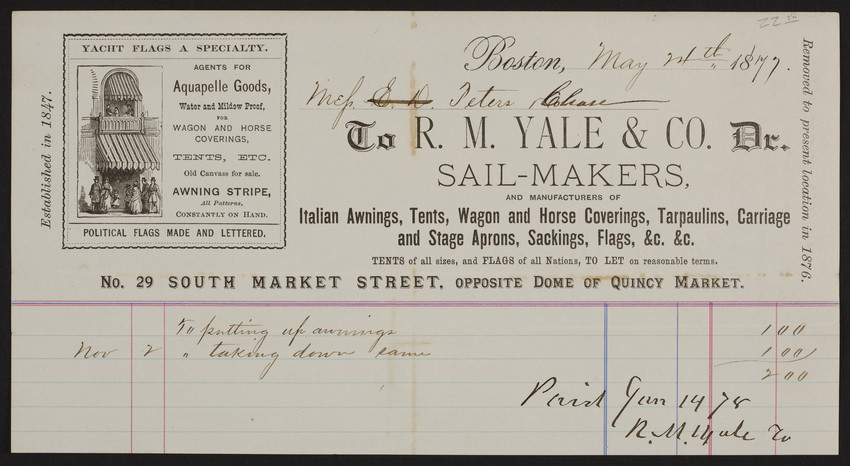
Billhead for R.M. Yale & Co., established in 1847, sailmakers, at 29 South Market Street, Boston, next to the Quincy Market

== Early life ==
Rufus M. Yale was born January 17, 1822, the son of Jane Stubbs and David Yale of Norwich, Connecticut, great-grandson of Capt. Theophilus Yale, members of the Yale family. His granduncles were Theophilus Yale of New Brunswick, Canada, father of fur trader James Murray Yale of the Hudson's Bay Company, and Capt. Elihu Yale of Connecticut.

His aunt, Eliza Yale of Caldwell Manor, Quebec, became the grandmother of philanthropist Laura Almina Wood, daughter-in-law of Lt. Gov. Julius Catlin, and member of the family of Julia H. Catlin of Chateau d'Annel, France, and Senator Chauncey Depew, railroad president for Cornelius Vanderbilt.

== Biography ==
Yale attended school in Yarmouth and studied under a private teacher from Newburyport, Massachusetts. He then embarked on a ship and went on a trip for two years at sea, which he returned in 1840, and started learning the trade of a sailmaker in Newburyport. He continued his trade in Boston in 1848, and added in 1852, the manufacturing of tents and awnings. His firm R. M. Yale & Co., established in 1847, would become a manufacturer of flags, banners and other campaign merchandise, including yacht flags. They also added the manufacture of aquapelle goods for wagon and horse coverings, large tents for political meetings, Italian awnings, tarpaulins, carriage and stage aprons, sackings, political flags and the American flag.

In 1852, he put up the first Italian awnings in Boston, sold to commission merchant James W. Page, who was a trustee of the Thomas–Webster Estate, and friend of Secretary of State Daniel Webster. Yale became the leading Boston merchant in sail, awning and tent making in New England. He was also a pioneer in the development of the city of Malden, Massachusetts from a small town to a thriving city. He had as customer James Bruce, 8th Earl of Elgin, Governor General of Canada, later Viceroy of India under Queen Victoria, and was in charge of erecting the largest tent in Quebec at the time for the Governor's event. His offices were on South Market Street, next to Quincy Market, later at the Fulton-Commercial Streets District.

At the beginning of the American Civil War, Sgt. Rufus Yale entertained Capt. Edwin C. Bailey, leader of the parade and owner of the Boston Herald, and the patriots of the Ancient and Honorable Artillery Company of Massachusetts at his offices. For most of his business career, he had the contracts of decorating the events of public figures in the Boston area and other places. He was a Democrat in politics, and was recorded in 1881 among the membership of the Association Over Nine Hundred of Boston's Prominent Citizens.

Yale was a member of the Newburyport Artillery Company from 1846 to 1848, then a member of the Ancient and Honorable Artillery Company of Massachusetts in 1861, and a sergeant of the Artillery Company in 1863. He was also a Freemason, member of the Wyoming Lodge, Hugh de Payens Commandery, Knights Templars of Melrose, and the Massachusetts Charitable Mechanic Association, in addition of having been Chairman of the Overseers of the Poor of Malden, Massachusetts where he lived.

== Personal life ==
Rufus M. Yale stayed engaged in the sailmaking business for over 50 years, and died on October 13, 1899. A delegation of the Artillery Company under Capt. Folsem and the Freemasons of Boston were sent at his funerals. Yale's father-in-law was Enos Wilder, a pioneer safe inventor and manufacturer.

Yale married to Abby Ann Cheney on July 23, 1845, later to Rebecca Wilder, and had one son and two daughters, one of which married to Dr. Godfrey Ryder. Funerals of Rufus's last wife were held in 1899 by Rev. James F. Albion, father of Harvard professor Robert G. Albion, and flowers were given by ex Malden mayor, Elisha S. Converse, the Daughters of the American Revolution, and Rufus Yale's employees.
