= Elihu Yale (captain) =

Connecticut bayonet manufacturer (1747–1806)

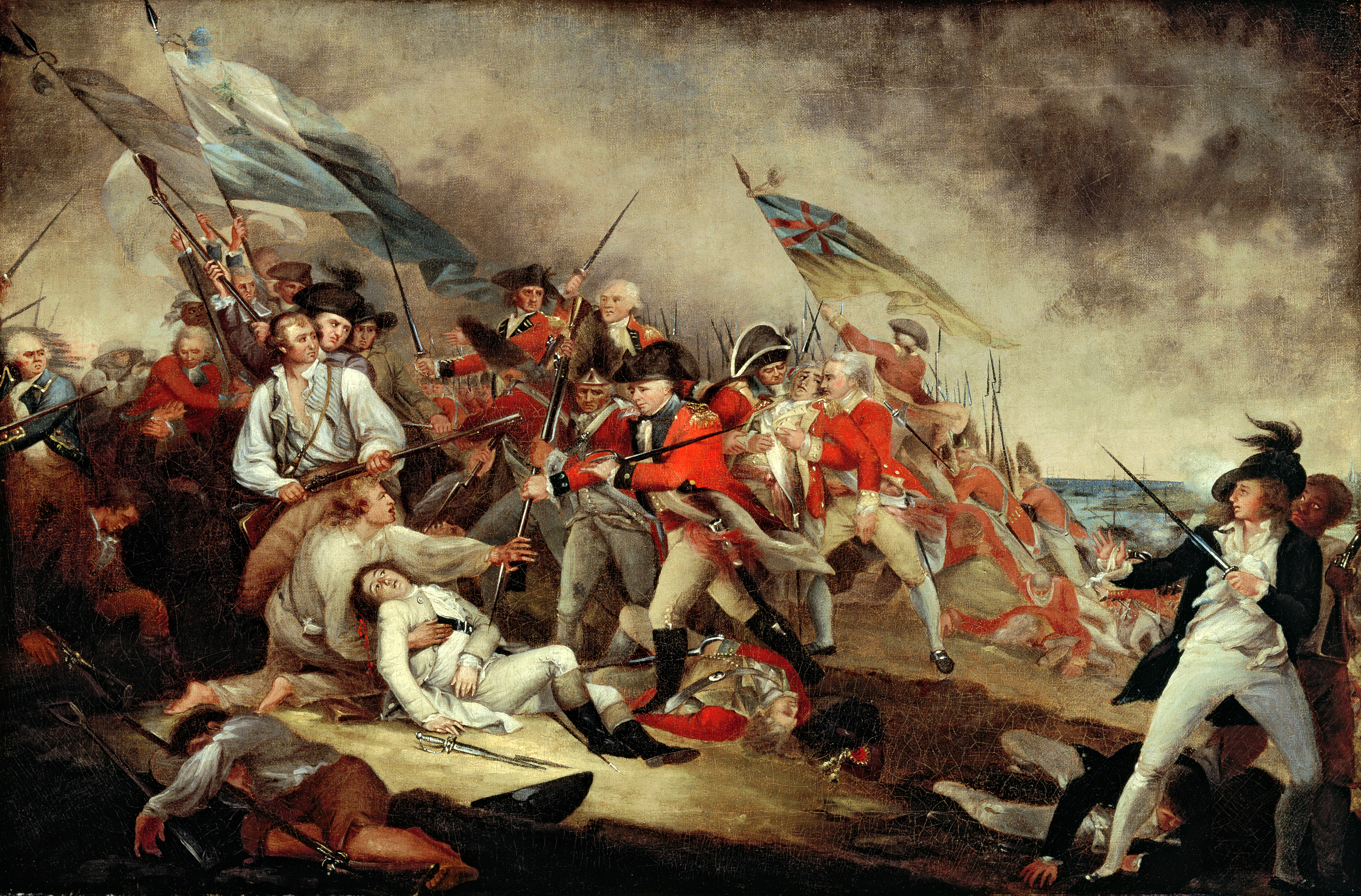
Continental army at the Battle of Bunker Hill, Capt. Elihu Yale was a member of its 15th Regiment, during the American War of Independence

Elihu Yale (1747 – May 12, 1806) was an American military commanding officer, and one of the first manufacturers of bayonets in Connecticut. He served during the American War of Independence, and later became the grandfather of penny press pioneer Moses Yale Beach.

== Biography ==
Elihu Yale of Wallingford was born in 1747, to Theophilus Yale and Azubah Wolf, members of the Yale family. His grandfather, Capt. Theophilus Yale, was a magistrate of the city, while his great-grandfather, Capt. Thomas Yale, was one of the founders of Wallingford, Connecticut. He also served as a magistrate. Yale was an early settler of Wallingford with his family and joined the Continental Army during the American War of Independence.

He served as Sergeant in Col. Thaddeus Cook's Regiment of Militia, in New Haven and Fairfield, Connecticut. The regiment served as reinforcement during the Saratoga Campaign to Gen. Horatio Gates. He served as Sergeant in the New Haven Alarm regiment of the Connecticut State militia, a unit organized for the costal defense between New York and New Haven. He also served at Tryon's Invasion of Connecticut, led by British Gen. William Tryon. Yale was then under the orders of Capt. Abraham Stanley, his brother-in-law, who had served in the 10th Continental Regiment, part of the Connecticut Line. On August 27, 1777, from Wallingford, Yale's regiment was sent to assist Gen. Enoch Poor's brigade. Yale eventually became a commanding officer, reaching the rank of Captain. He was a member of the 15th Continental Regiment of Gen. William Heath, who were involved in the Battle of Bunker Hill during the Siege of Boston.

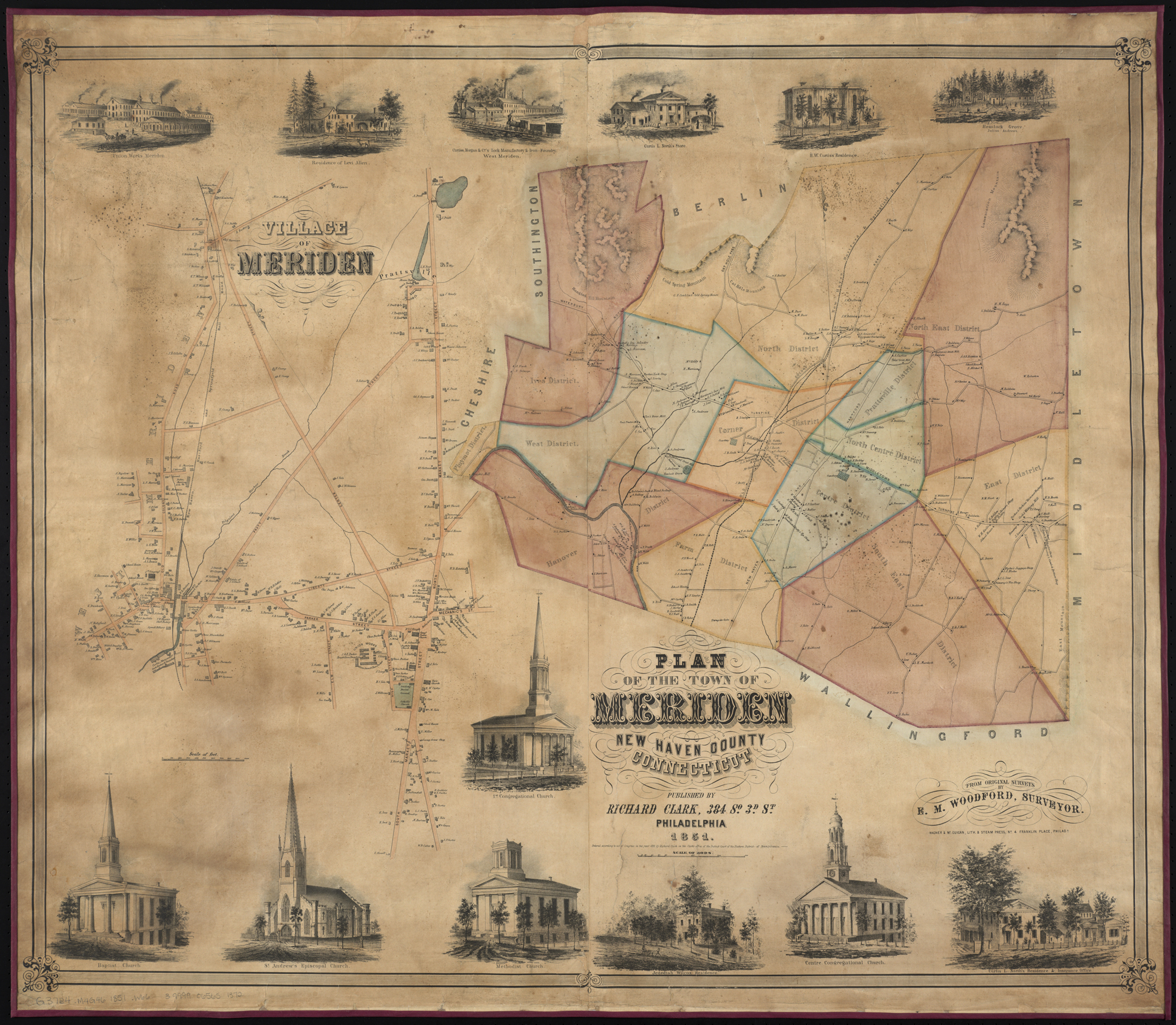
Map of Meriden, Connecticut, 19th century

Initially a blacksmith, he became wealthy from his ventures. He was among the first manufacturers in Connecticut at the time, being a pioneer in the manufacturing of bayonets and scythes. Bayonets were used as ancillary weapons at war while scythes were used by farmers for mowing grass and harvesting crops. He also became one of the largest landholders in Wallingford. For his role in the war, he is recognized as a Patriot of the Revolution by the Daughters of the American Revolution. His son Ira Yale would follow in his footsteps and become a pewter manufacturer. He was the pewter master of Lemuel Johnson Curtis and William Elton. They acquired his enterprise in 1835 and started the firm Curtis & Hall, German silver and Britannia Ware manufacturers.

Manufacturer Ashbil Griswold would also acquire land in the Northern part of Meriden, Connecticut from Ira Yale to start his pewter and block tin business. Ira Yale's third cousins were Union Army major general William Tecumseh Sherman, Judge Charles Taylor Sherman, United States Senator and United States Secretary of State John Sherman, Warden Thomas Mott Osborne, and United States Attorney General T. McKeen Chidsey. Capt. Yale's brother was also a blacksmith. The brothers were the uncles of Eliza Yale, grandmother of philanthropist Laura A. Wood who married the son of Connecticut Lieutenant Governor Julius Catlin, and of fur merchant James Murray Yale, who had his name given to Yaletown in Downtown Vancouver.

They were also the granduncles of Boston sailmaker Rufus M. Yale. Another of Capt. Yale's brother, Nathaniel Yale, became the great-grandfather of Judge George Edwin Lawrence, father of Senator Edwin W. Lawrence and partner of Lt. Col. and Congressman Charles Herbert Joyce. He was the father of Vermont state attorney Robert A. Lawrence, who married the granddaughter of Senator Augustus P. Hunton.

== Personal life ==
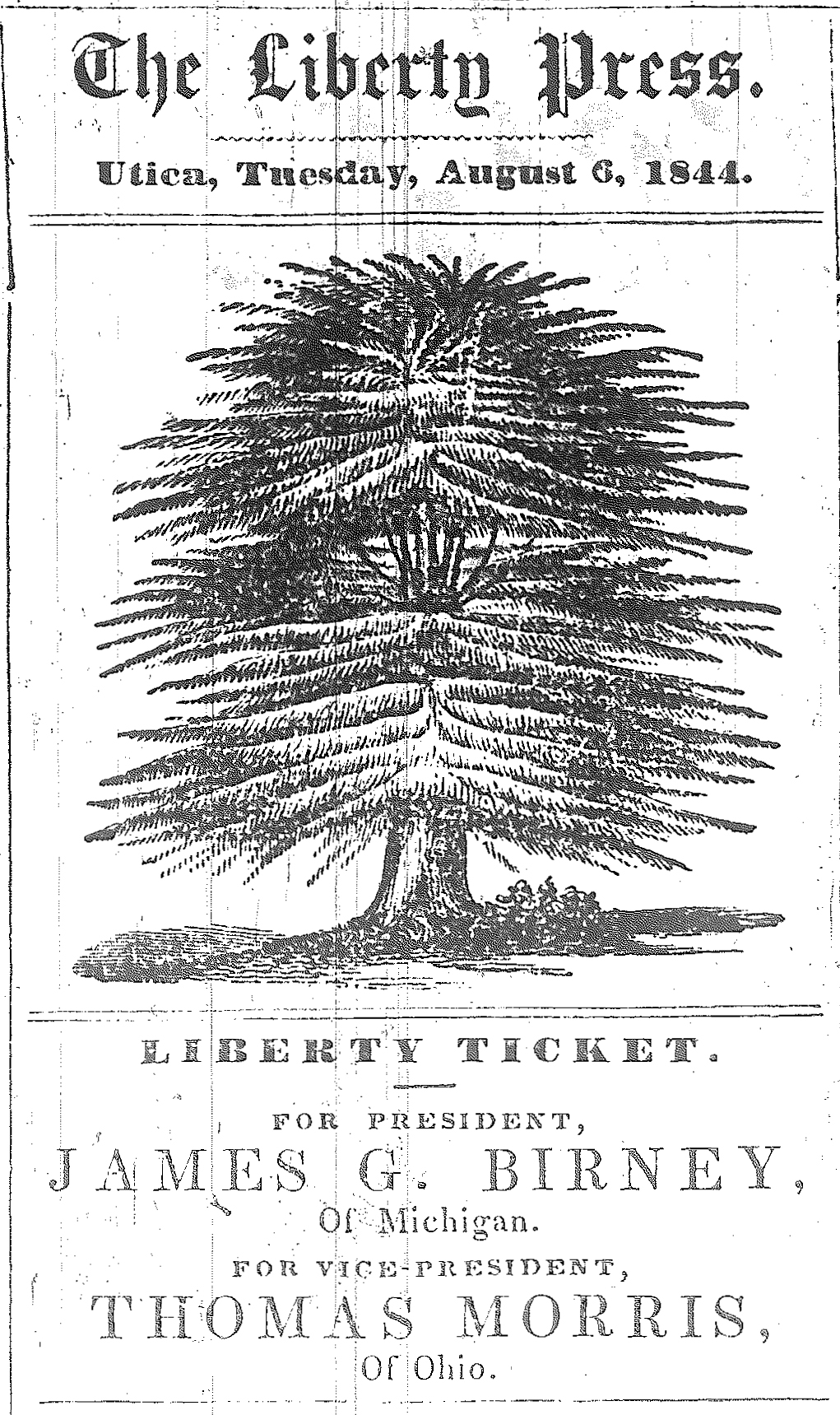
A Liberty Party publication, inciting to vote for the Liberty ticket, 1844

Capt. Elihu Yale married on November 24, 1774, to Lucretia Stanley, daughter of Capt. Abraham Stanley, and descendant of Capt. John Stanley of the Stanley-Whitman House. He died on May 12, 1806, on a Sunday, after having attended church. His wife died on April 30, 1813. They had 7 children together.

- Lois Yale (1776–1814), wife of Postmaster and tavern owner Jared Kirtland, became the aunt of Judge Jared Potter Kirtland, cofounder of Western Reserve University. Their daughter, Lois Yale Kirtland, married to Dr. Eli Mygatt, son of the President of the City Bank of Cleveland, and their granddaughter became the mother-in-law of Pennsylvania politician Ira Franklin Mansfield, owner of coal mines, board director of the First National Bank of Rochester, and president of Beaver College.
- Lucretia Yale (1778–1800), married County Surveyor and Deputy Sheriff Moses Sperry Beach, and became the mother of newspaper entrepreneur Moses Yale Beach, who, at one point, owned the largest newspaper in America. The William street, Meadow Street and Orchard Street, in Wallingford, are named after Moses Yale Beach's estate. His son, abolitionist Moses S. Beach, would sell his paper the New York Sun to a friend of Karl Marx named Charles Anderson Dana, Assistant Secretary of War of Abraham Lincoln, and stayed a stockholder.
- Ira Yale (1783–1864), became Justice of the Peace and Postmaster of Meriden, landowner, pewter manufacturer and owned a general grocery store. His son Elihu Yale Jr. became Judge of the Probate court and Postmaster of Cheshire, Connecticut, then member of the City Council of New Haven, Chief of Police, Constable and Justice of the Peace. He was also a marble manufacturer and the author of the Yale genealogy book published in 1850.

Capt. Yale's cousin, Rev. Thomas Yale, became the first of the Yales to graduate from Yale College in 1765. The past member being Deacon David Yale, educated at Cambridge University, England, who received an honorary degree from Yale in 1724. This was the David Yale initially considered to inherit the fortune of Elihu Yale, benefactor of Yale College, but the man's whole estate, made from the diamond mines of Golconda, India, went to the British branch instead, and was lost through corruption with no living descendants past his grandchildren. Another cousin of Capt. Yale was Capt. Josiah Yale and abolitionist Levi Yale, cofounder of the anti-slavery political party of Connecticut named the Liberty Party.
