= Henry Newsham Peers =

Canadian fur merchant

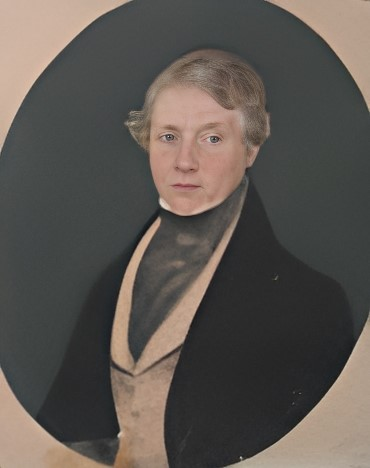
- Portrait of Henry Newsham Peers, chief trader for the Hudson's Bay Company, about 1840
- Born: 17 March 1821; Lymington, England
- Died: 27 March 1864 (aged 42–43); Saanich, British Columbia
- Occupations: fur trader, chief trader, politician, pioneer
- Spouse: Eliza Yale
- Children: 4

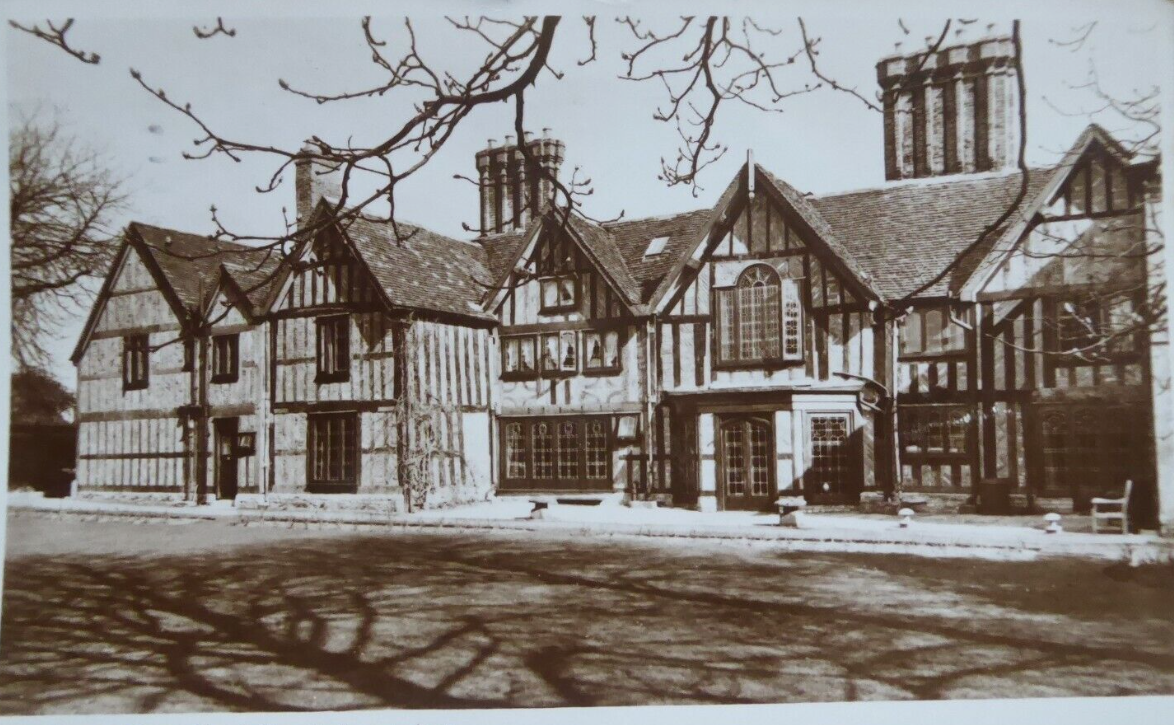
Alveston Manor, Alveston, Warwickshire, ancient seat of the Peers family of Henry Newsham Peers, was sold by his great-grandfather

Captain Henry Newsham Peers (1821 – 1864) was a Canadian fur trader, military officer and British Columbia pioneer. He became a clerk in the Montreal Department of the Hudson's Bay Company, eventually rising to the rank of chief trader. He also established Fort Hope in British Columbia, and served as Captain under Gov. Isaac Stevens during American Indian Wars of 1855-1856.

== Early life ==
Henry Newsham Peers was born on March 17, 1821, at Lymington, England, to Captain H. Peers, son of Count Julianus Petrus de Linnée, member of a noble family from Brittany, France. The Count was married to Mary Eliza Peers, and died while returning from the Gatton Park Estate in England. Peers's father, Capt. Henry Peers, born de Linné, was a magistrate, Commissioner of Taxes, and graduate of Trinity College at Oxford University. He took the surname of Peers by Royal license as the heir of his mother Mary Eliza Peers.

Henry Newsham Peers was named after his great-great-granduncle, Col. Henry Newsham Peers, commander of the Prince of Wales's Own Royal Regiment, and son-in-law of Sir Charles Holt of Oxfordshire. Col. Peers succeeded to Gen. Joseph Sabine and served under Gen. John Huske. He was promoted to the rank of Major General at the Battle of Dettingen under King George II of Great Britain, but died at Dettingen before receiving his new title.

Peers's great-grandfather, Newsham Peers, inherited Alveston Manor, his family ancestral estate, from the male line of Robert Peers, wine merchant of Bristol, England, who arrived at Alveston around 1540. He later sold the estate, having no direct male heir, for about £39,500 in 1810. The property would later be in possession of Lieut.-Colonel R. H. R. Brocklebank.

== Career ==
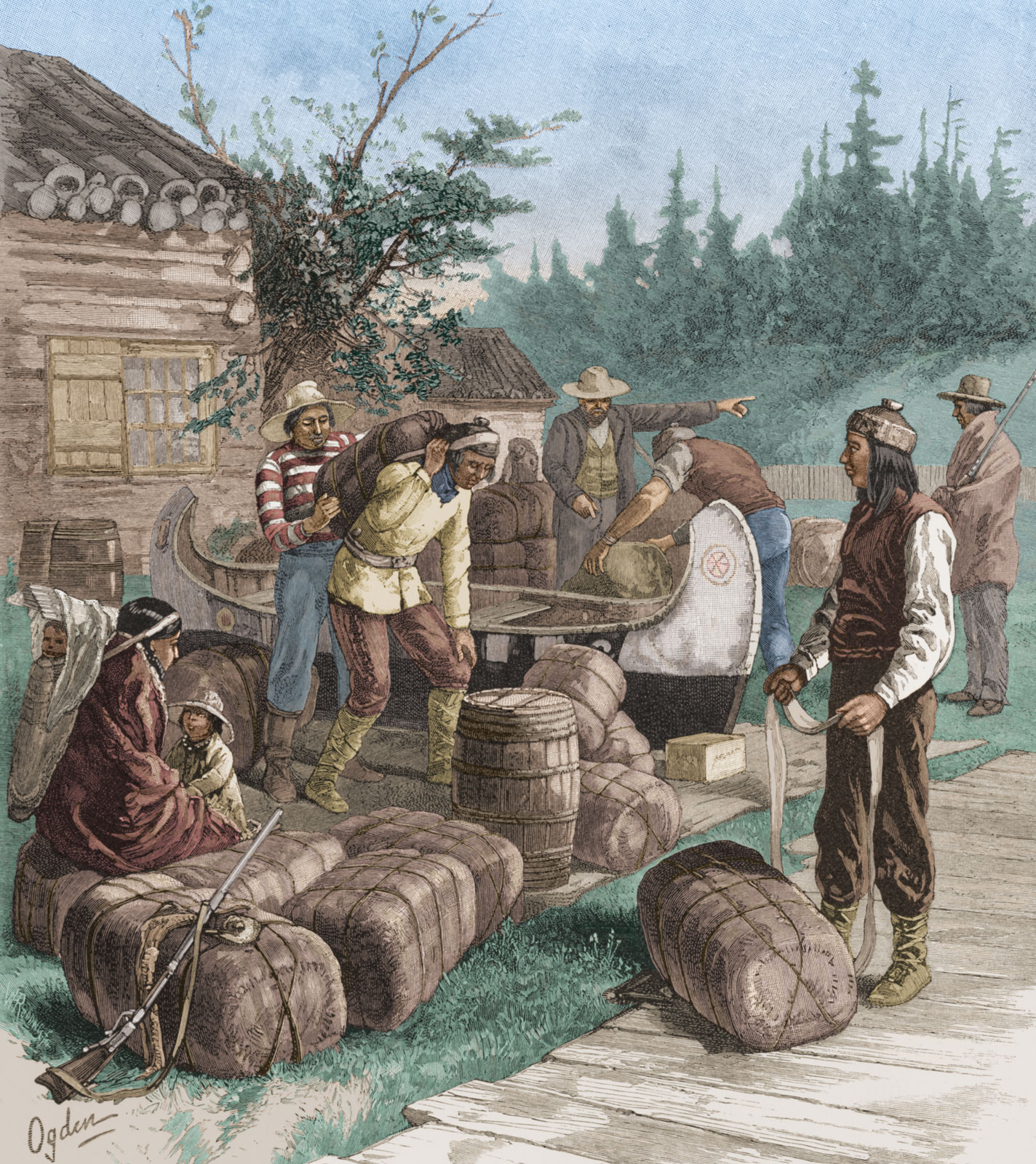
Indians at a Hudson's Bay Company trading post in the 1800s

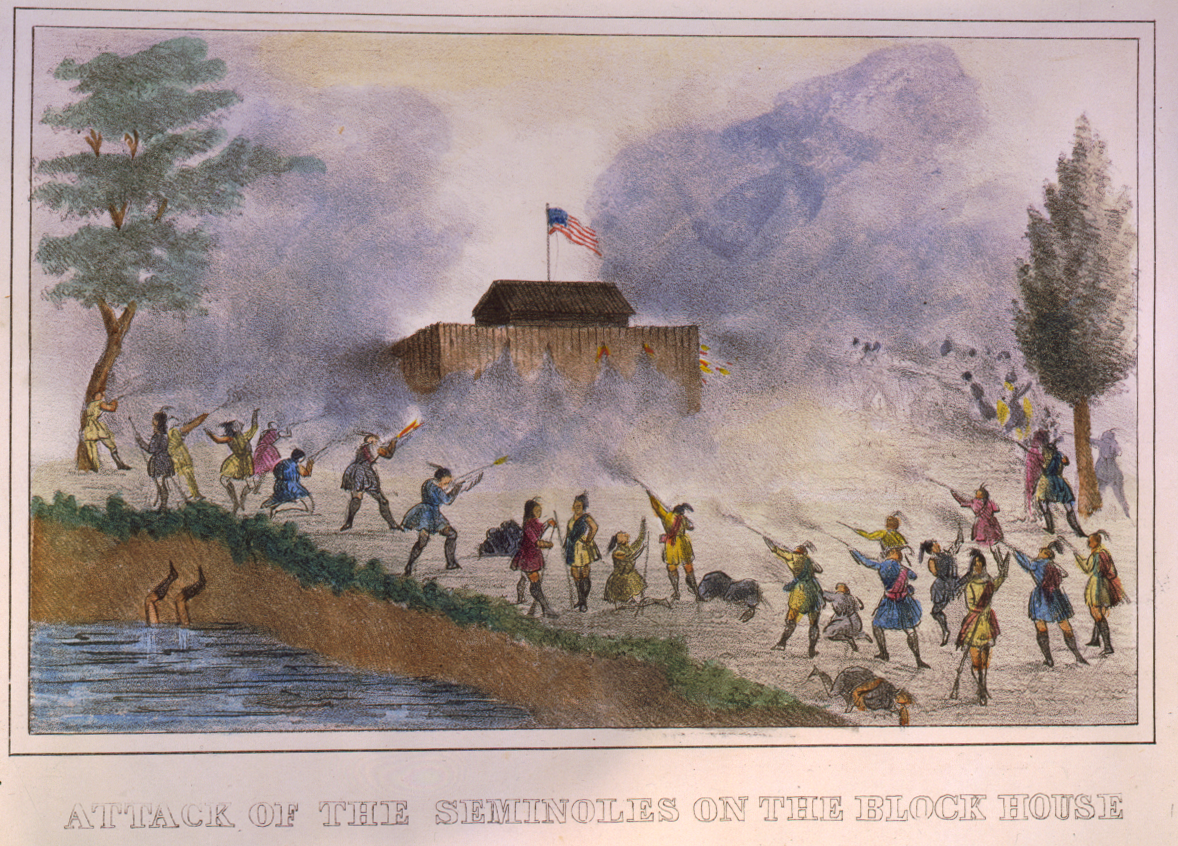
Attack on a block house, part of the American Indian Wars

Henry Newsham Peers entered the Royal Military Academy of Woolwich in south-east London, and thereafter left England for Montreal. He started his career in the Hudson's Bay Company with his brother Richard Augustus, who would become a fur trader and post manager. Throughout his career, Peers would become an apprentice clerk, port agent, elected representative in Vancouver County and chief trader for the HBC. Peers was an apprentice clerk in the Montreal Department of the Hudson's Bay Company, starting in 1841. He then worked at Lachine, Montreal, and joined, as an apprentice clerk, the Columbia District of the company around 1843.

He was made a clerk at Fort Vancouver under Richard Line and Thomas Lowe. In 1846, Peers was elected a representative of Vancouver County, becoming a member of the legislature on the Provisional Government of Oregon. During his time in politics, he launched a petition to Oregon, asking the Congress of the United States to confirm properties, educational policies and navigational facilities related to the trade on the Columbia River. After the Oregon Treaty of 1846, he became a port agent, with the HBC leaving Fort Astoria, the past central trading post of John Jacob Astor, which had been taken by the HBC.

This treaty was made to establish the limits between British North America (modern Canada), and the US territories. His new role was at Baker's Bay, a central stronghold of the fur trading activities in the Columbia District. Peers then tried to improve the trading route from Fort Yale to Kamloops for the HBC, following the trails of Mr. Anderson. In the same year, he discovered a new trading route from Kamloops to the Coquihalla River, bypassing the custom duties of the Americans on goods normally shipped to Fort Vancouver.

In the same year, he founded Fort Hope in British Columbia, located on the Fraser River, under chief factor Sir James Douglas, future governor and cofounder of British Columbia. Peers then opened a new trading route to Peers Creek, named after himself, all the way to the Sowaqua basin and Similkameen Valley. In 1849, his brother Richard Augustus married the daughter of chief trader John Bell, a pioneer of the Yukon River, and one of the fellows who joined John Rae's expedition to bring back Sir John Franklin.

In 1850, Sir George Simpson, Governor of the HBC, informed chief trader James Murray Yale that Peers would be sent to the coal mines, but Peers didn't follow through. Peers then became a clerk at Fort Langley where his future father-in-law, James Murray Yale, would be his commander.

== Later life ==
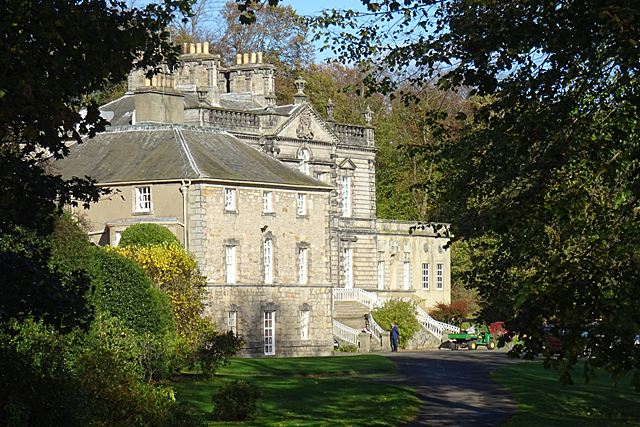
Drum House near Edinburgh, estate of Peers's cousin family, the Lord Somerville

In 1853, Peers achieved the rank of chief trader, having now a share in the company's profits, and was made captain under Gov. Isaac Stevens of Washington during the American Indian Wars of 1855. His military unit was the 1st Regiment of the Cowlitz Rangers. Peers was also a member of the Agricultural and Horticultural Society under Chief Justice David Cameron.

Around 1858, Capt. Peers retired from the Hudson's Bay Company, and settled on his 205 acres farm. Around 1859, his father-in-law, chief trader James Murray Yale, provided him financing for a saw and grist mill, as he lived on a neighbouring property. Henry Newsham Peers died on March 27, 1864, at Saanich, British Columbia, and was buried at Ross Bay Cemetery.

He was married to Eliza Yale, daughter of chief trader James Murray Yale of the Yale family. They had one son, three daughters and five grandchildren. His sister-in-law married the son of Sir George Simpson. Peers's aunt Augusta married Rev. Thomas Robinson, a Fellow of Queen's College, Oxford. His cousin Thomas Jr. became a Deacon from Christ Church, Oxford, and the son-in-law of Admiral Kenelm Somerville, 17th Lord Somerville, of Drum House in Scotland.

His two other cousins married the sons of Dr. William Frederick Chambers, nephew of Sir Robert Chambers. His wife Eliza Yale was also a cousin of Major George Henry Yale and politician Arthur Yale.
