= Macdonald Hotels =

Hotel chain

Macdonald Hotels Ltd, formed in 1990 by Donald Macdonald, is a hotel company based in Bathgate, West Lothian, Scotland.

Its main subsidiary, Macdonald Hotels and Resorts, owns or operates hotels and holiday resorts in the UK and Spain.

== History ==
In 1990, Managing Director of Stakis hotels, Donald Macdonald, created Macdonald Hotels Ltd by purchasing two Scottish hotels. The company continued to grow through various acquisitions, including hotels formerly owned by De Vere hotels and The Rank Organisation, as well as managing resorts in Spain under time-share, through a contract with Barratt Developments.

Macdonald Hotels was bought from shareholders by its management in 2003 in a management buyout facilitated by Bank of Scotland. The value of the transaction was £590 million. It expanded rapidly with the purchase of some "Forte Heritage Hotels" from Forte Hotels after the latter's takeover by Granada plc. In March 2005 the company reported a 600% web revenue increase, owing the tangible increase to a new online marketing strategy. In 2007 the company sold 24 hotels to Moorfield Real Estate Fund. It subsequently bid for the Management Contract to continue running these hotels but lost out to AccorHotels.

== List of hotels ==
Hotel	City
The Macdonald Berystede Hotel & Spa	Ascot, Nr Windsor
Macdonald Highlands Hotel	Aviemore
Macdonald Norwood Hall Hotel	Aberdeen
Macdonald Aviemore Hotel	Aviemore
Macdonald Morlich Hotel	Aviemore
Macdonald Highland Lodges	Aviemore
Macdonald Bath Spa	Bath
Macdonald Burlington Hotel	Birmingham
Macdonald Frimley Hall Hotel & Spa	Camberley
Macdonald Portal Hotel, Golf & Spa	Cheshire
The Lymm Hotel	Cheshire
Macdonald New Blossoms Hotel	Chester
Macdonald Hill Valley Spa, Hotel & Golf	Whitchurch
Macdonald Houstoun House	Uphall, Nr Livingston
Macdonald Crutherland House	East Kilbride
Macdonald Inchyra Hotel & Spa	Central Scotland
Swan Hotel	Grasmere
Macdonald Drumossie Hotel	Inverness
Macdonald Loch Rannoch Hotel & Resort	Kinloch Rannoch
Macdonald Compleat Angler Hotel	Marlow
Macdonald Marine Hotel & Spa	North Berwick
Macdonald Forest Hills Hotel & Resort	Nr Aberfoyle
Macdonald Craxton Wood Hotel	Nr Chester
Macdonald Pittodrie Hotel	Nr Aberdeen
Macdonald Linden Hall, Golf & Country Club	Nr Morpeth
Macdonald Botley Park Hotel, Golf & Spa	Nr Southampton
Macdonald Cardrona Hotel, Golf & Spa	Peebles Nr Edinburgh
Macdonald Tickled Trout Hotel	Preston
Macdonald Alveston Manor Hotel	Stratford-upon-Avon
Macdonald Swan's Nest Hotel	Stratford-upon-Avon
Macdonald Elmers Court Hotel & Resort	The New Forest
Macdonald Leeming House	Ullswater
Macdonald Ansty Hall	Warwickshire
Macdonald Kilhey Court Hotel & Spa	Wigan
Macdonald Old England Hotel & Spa	Windermere
Macdonald Windsor Hotel	Windsor
Macdonald Bear Hotel	Woodstock
