= Drumossie Hotel =

Hotel in Highland, Scotland

Coordinates: 57.45749°N 4.15967°W

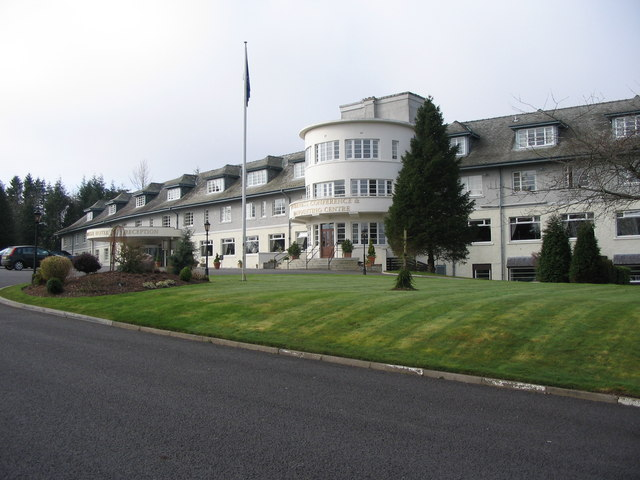
Drumossie Hotel

The Drumossie Hotel is an art deco resort and conference centre two kilometres south east of Inverness.

== History ==
The building was designed by Carruthers May and built in the art deco style as a traditional roadhouse in about 1930. It was requisitioned to serve as the headquarters of No. 14 Group RAF in June 1940 during the Second World War. The headquarters moved later to a permanent location at Raigmore House in 1941 and the building reverted to hotel use and by the 1970s was trading as the "Royal Stuart Motor Hotel". More recently known as the "Drumossie Hotel", it was operated by Shearings in the 1990s but has since been acquired by Macdonald Hotels.
