= Alveston Manor =

- Alveston Manor Hotel
- Interactive map of Alveston Manor
- Location: Stratford-upon-Avon, Warwickshire, England
- Coordinates: 52°11′25″N 1°41′52″W
- Original use: Country house
- Architectural style: Elizabethan
- Owner: Macdonald Hotels

Alveston Manor is a predominantly Elizabethan building located on the northern edge of Stratford-upon-Avon's town centre. Currently it is known as the Macdonald Alveston Manor Hotel, which forms part of the Macdonald Hotels group. The building is reputed to be the site of the first performance of William Shakespeare's A Midsummer Night's Dream and is a Grade II listed building.

== Location ==
Alveston Manor is located in what was the Barlichway Hundred of Warwickshire County. It is located on Banbury Road, at the southern end of Clopton Bridge in Bridgetown, Stratford-upon-Avon.

== Pre-Manor ==
An Anglo-Saxon cemetery, dating from the early 6th to early 7th centuries, was excavated on the site in 1934. More than a hundred burials were discovered, where the "high proportion of male burials with weapons [was] taken to indicate the presence of a warrior and social elite." Also found were "fine necklaces and exquisite broaches".

In 1970, while extending the hotel's carpark, an extensive Saxon burial ground was excavated, including six graves, the remains of four cremations, three other possible graves and nine skeletons, including that of a six-foot warrior buried in what was thought to be a unique way; with heavy planks on top of the skeleton. As part of the dig archaeologists used radioactive capsules for the first time in Britain to discover the age of the relics that they discovered including urns, pottery, shields, spears and broaches. The dig continued in 1971, with the hope of finding a settlement, but this did not materialise.

== Manor ==
The first building on the site was probably an anchorite's cell. Monks from Worcester Cathedral then built there. After the dissolution of the monasteries in the 16th century, the Chapter of Worcester Cathedral was allowed to keep Alveston Manor at the "cost of maintaining 12 divinity students," who had to be paid £6 7s 6d a year. In order to be released from this financial commitment, the Chapter returned the manor to the Crown.

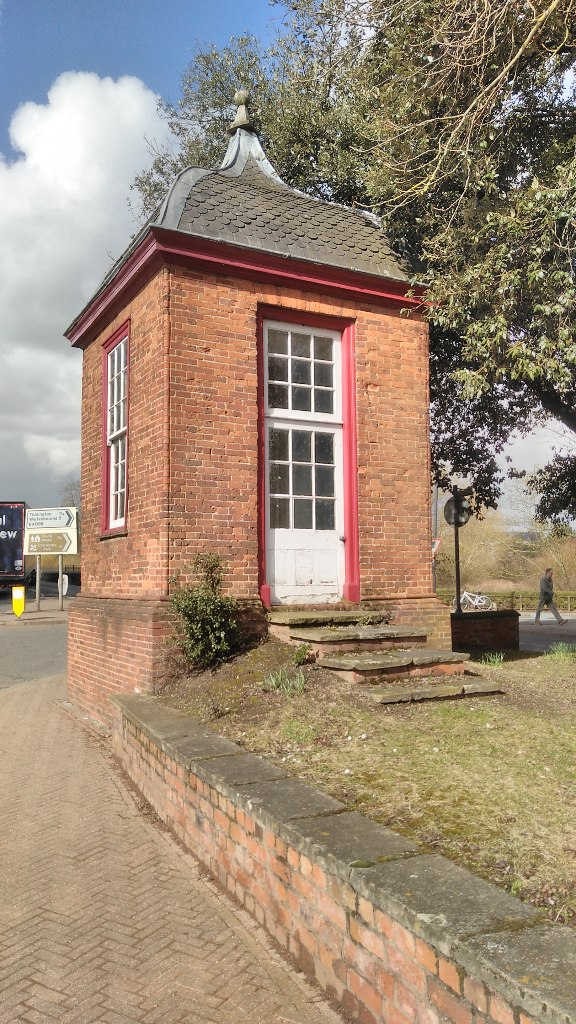
Alveston Manor gazebo

Elements of the current building date from the 10th century, but much of what has survived is from the early Tudor period, including 16th century panelling in the main building. Other owners and residents over the years have included Ludovic Greville (early 1400s), Newsham Peers, Sir Ambrose Cave (d. 1568), Sir Edward Greville, Richard Lane, who bought the manor in 1603, John Lane (1620s) and later Lieut.-Colonel R H R Brocklebank.

In 1812, when nearby Clopton Bridge was widened to allow for an increase in traffic a government act protected the manor from being touched. However, in 1827 when a cast-iron footway was added to the side of the bridge, a new act allowed for the demolition of the manor's 18th century gazebo. However, this did not happen and the gazebo is now "marooned on a traffic island."

=== Twentieth century developments ===
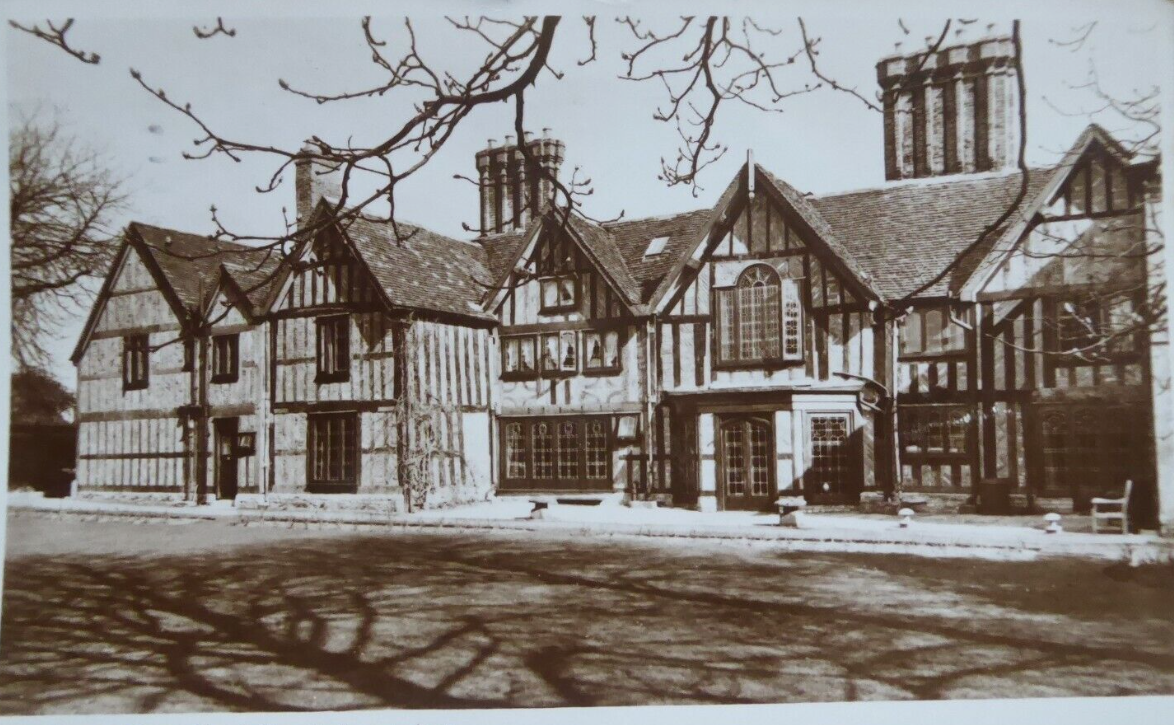
Postcard of Alveston Manor from the 1930s

Alveston Manor functioned as a private hotel in the 1930s. It was offered for sale "for the first time" in 1937, where it was described as "a perfect example of the 15th century".

During WWII the manor was requisitioned as a service club for Canadian officers. In 1945 there was a fire in a timber-framed wing, possibly the eastern end.

Alveston Manor re-opened as a hotel in 1947 by new owners Mr William Thomas and Mrs May Frances Bird who "refashioned the façade, using wood from scrapped Birmingham trams as window frames and timber from tank transporters as exterior beams." At this time the manor "boasted a fine pair of bowling alleys". Many extra rooms were added and in the 1950s, the stained-glass artist Donald Brooke was commissioned to create a window for the hotel including "all the coats-of-arms from William the Conqueror to our Queen's present time." By 1956, the hotel, still surrounded by six acres of its own land, could accommodate 110 people, with 51 bedrooms, 31 private bathrooms and seven public bathrooms. It was granted a full liquor license in 1956.

In 1962 the manor's entire contents were auctioned off in 760 lots "at extremely short notice" by the Bird family, and the building was sold to hotelier Sir Charles Forte, Baron Forte of Forte and Co for an estimated £100,000. The manor was turned into an "American-type" motel, with 100 self-contained units. In 1965 it was one of four Midlands hotels to be awarded a grade one rating from food critic, Egon Ronay. In 1966 Dame Margot Fonteyn and Rudolf Nureyev were guests of the hotel while in Stratford to perform Swan Lake.

The manor is currently owned by the Macdonald Hotel group.

== Shakespeare connection ==
It has been suggested that the first ever performance of A Midsummer Night's Dream took place at Alveston Manor. In the 1950s, Shakespeare's plays were performed in the manor's courtyard, including by the Festival Shakespeare Players from Oxford University. In 1962 Stratford's second full-height statue of Shakespeare was erected in Alveston Manor's grounds.
