= Theophilus Yale =

Magistrate from Wallingford, Connecticut

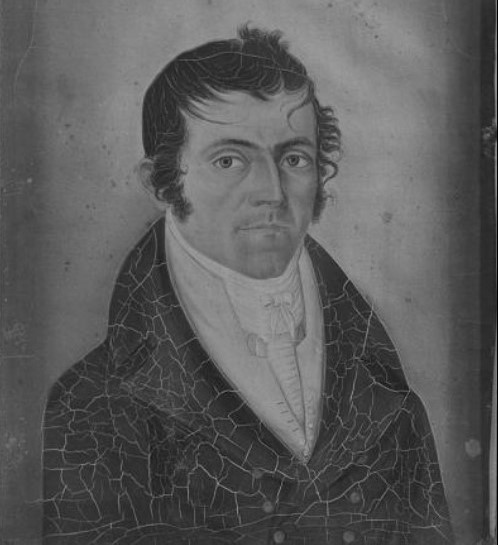
Capt. Theophilus Yale's great-grandnephew, Sea captain Theophilus Yale, nephew of Capt. Elihu Yale

Theophilus Yale (1675 – 1760) was a British military officer, magistrate, and one of the early settlers of Wallingford, Connecticut. His grandnephew, Lyman Hall, became one of the Founding Fathers of the United States, and a signatory of the Declaration of Independence. Yale was also a deputy of the Connecticut House of Representatives and Justice of the Peace for Wallingford.

His daughter, Sarah Yale, became the great-grandmother of abolitionist Congressman Sherlock James Andrews, who welcomed Abraham Lincoln at Cleveland during his presidential visit.

== Biography ==
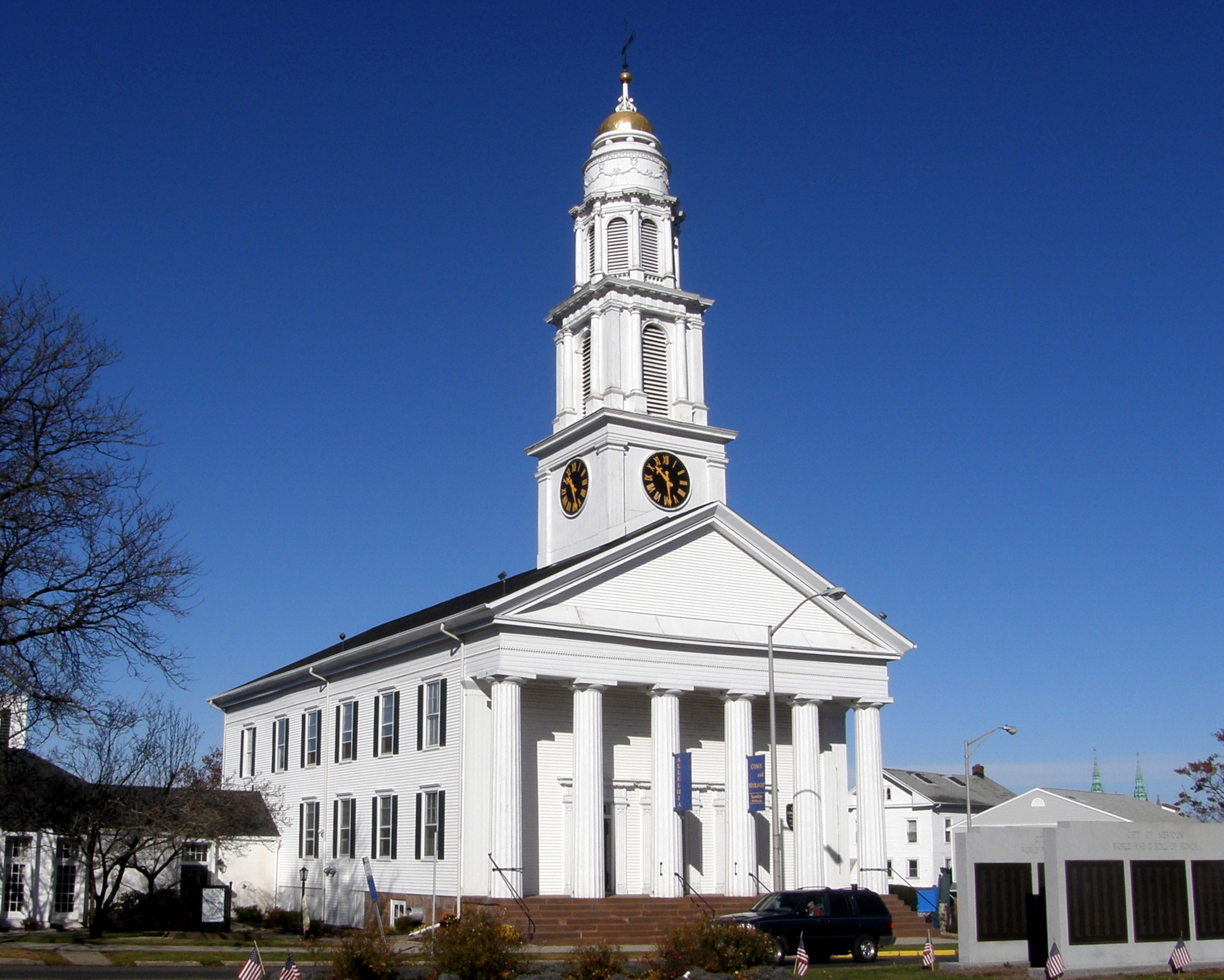
Center Congregational Church, Meriden, Connecticut, Theophilus Yale's brother was one of its founders

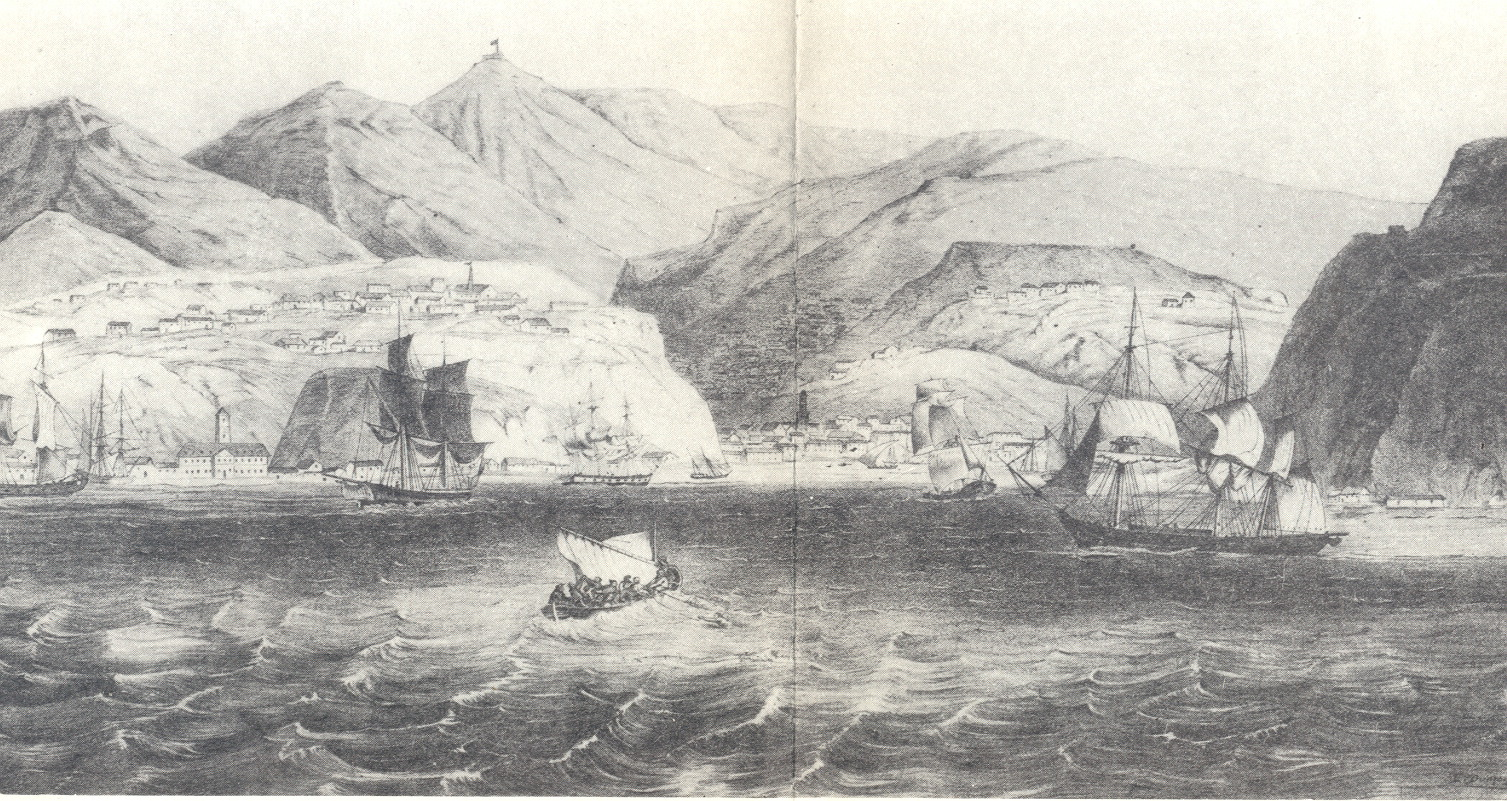
Valparaiso Bay, Chile, where Sea captain Theophilus Yale died, in the early 19th century

Theophilus Yale was born on November 13, 1675, to Thomas Yale and Rebecca Gibbards, daughter of William Gibbards. He was a member of the Yale family, namesake of the future Yale College, and descendant of the Princes of Powys Fadog, Lords of Yale and Dinas Bran. His father was one of the founders of Wallingford, Connecticut, and his grandfather, Thomas Yale, was one of the founders of New Haven Colony. Theophilus's brother, Thomas Yale Jr., was also one of the founders of the Congregational Church of Meriden, with Theophilus Hall, a Yale graduate, as their pastor.

Yale is recorded among the early settlers and proprietors of the town of Wallingford, along with his father. He became a magistrate from about 1724, at 49 years old, to the end of his life in 1760, and occupied various offices in the city and the military. He was described as a "true servant of the people". Yale was made Justice of the Peace of New Haven from 1727 to 1729, and performed 4 marriages, which under the Puritans, could only be performed by a civil magistrate. On May 14, 1734, Yale is recorded as a witness for a concession of 75 aces, in the County of New Haven, to James Scoville of Scoville Hill in Harwinton, Connecticut.

In 1735, Yale is recorded as a Deputy of the Connecticut House of Representatives, representing Wallingford with Benjamin Hall, and would stay for most of his political career. The Assembly, presided by Joseph Talcott and Jonathan Law, had in attendance the other deputies such as David Goodrich, Roger Wolcott, Jonathan Trumbull, Thomas Fitch, William Pitkin, and many others representing different cities across the State. They elected a few lieutenants and captains to be in charge of the trainbands in various cities. Yale was among the deputies present for the re-election of Talcott in 1737.

In 1739, he was appointed by the assembly to form a committee to hear the records of the acts of the assembly read off and compleated, with Isaac Dickerman, Benjamin Hall, John Riggs, Samuel Bassett, John Russell, and 5 others. He was reappointed Justice of the Peace of New Haven County in 1736, a few times more in 1737, 1739, 1740, 1741, and once more in 1742 for the next year ensuing.

In 1742, at a meeting of the Convocation of New Haven County, Yale, as a member of the First Church of Wallingford, launched a complaint against Harvard graduate, Philemon Robbins, pastor of the First Church in Branford. The controversy concerned the Newlightism preaching of Rev. Robbins to the Baptists of Wallingford, whose group were not within his defined territory. His behavior, called disorderly and offensive in conduct to the laws of God, ended up in a trial, and Robbins was excluded from the council with criminal charges. Yale served as a magistrate until his death.

== Personal life ==
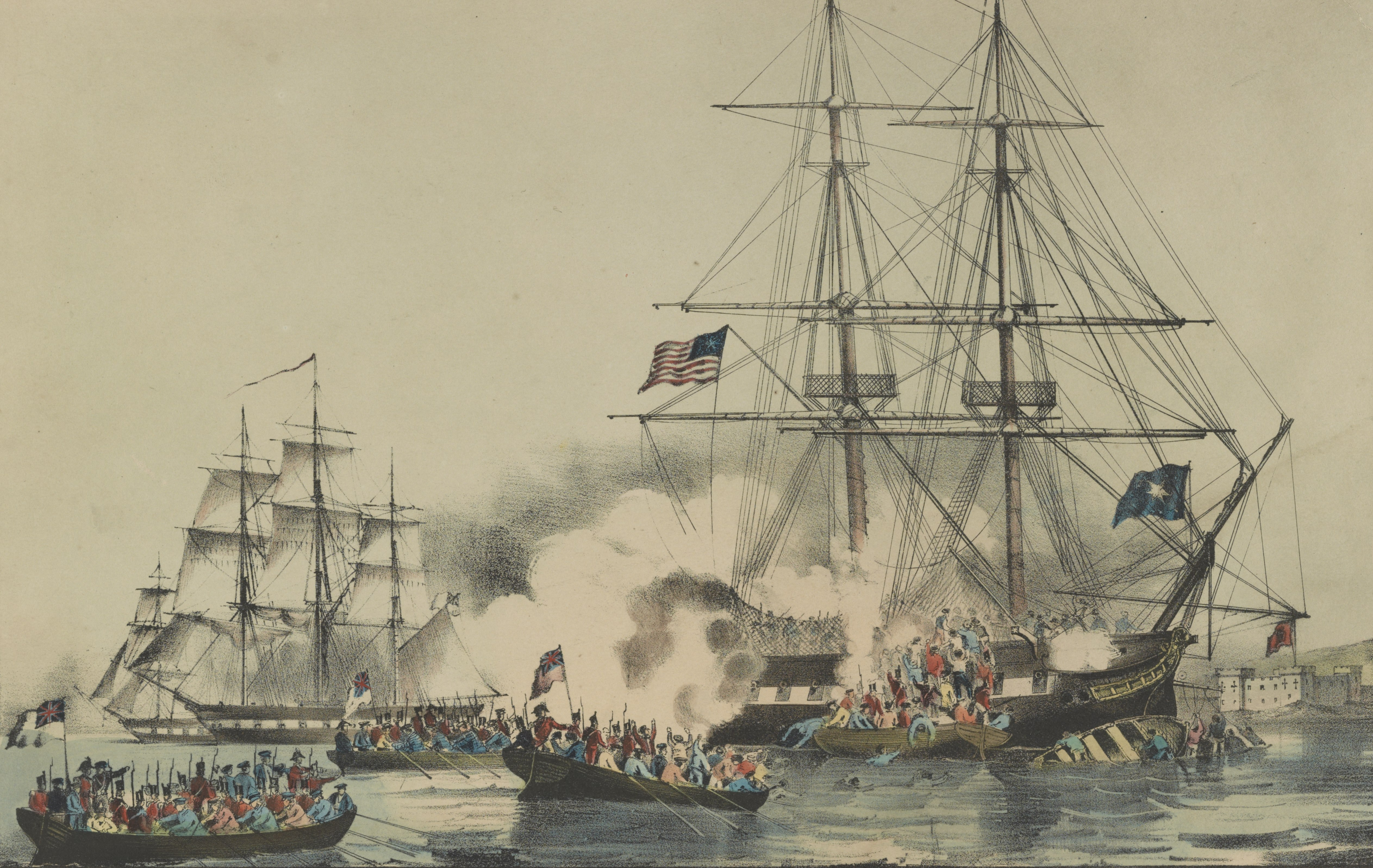
The General Armstrong, Joseph Yale's brother-in-law, Capt. Winship, was captured aboard during the War of 1812

Yale married Sarah Street, daughter of Samuel Street, Harvard graduate and cofounder of Wallingford. Her grandfather Nicholas Street was a minister, colleague of John Davenport, and graduate of Pembroke College at Oxford. Through his wife Sarah Street, Yale became the granduncle of Dr. Lyman Hall, one of the Founding Fathers of the United States. Hall was also a signatory of the Declaration of Independence, a Yale graduate, and Governor of Georgia.

Yale's daughter Sarah became the great-grandmother of abolitionist Congressman Sherlock James Andrews, who also graduated from Yale. Capt. Yale's brother-in-law, John Peck, was the nephew of Jeremiah Peck, a founder of Newark, New Jersey, and first rector of Hopkins Grammar School, funded by Theophilus's granduncle, Edward Hopkins of England.

Among his descendants, number were involved in seafaring ventures; the grandson of his son Theophilus, Sea Captain Theophilus Yale, was involved in the Old China Trade, dealing in natural resources, and died at sea in Valparaíso, Chile. Relatives included John Graham of Wallingford, seaman Joseph Yale, his brother-in-law the sea captain Thomas Davis Winship, Joseph Winship and sea captain Samuel Freeman. Thomas Winship was captured when serving aboard the brig General Armstrong under commander Samuel Chester Reid, who later helped design the Flag of the United States. He served as a Privateer in the War of 1812, serving America, and operated a whaling business with wholesale grocers Fitch Brothers & Co. of Marseille, France.

== Death ==
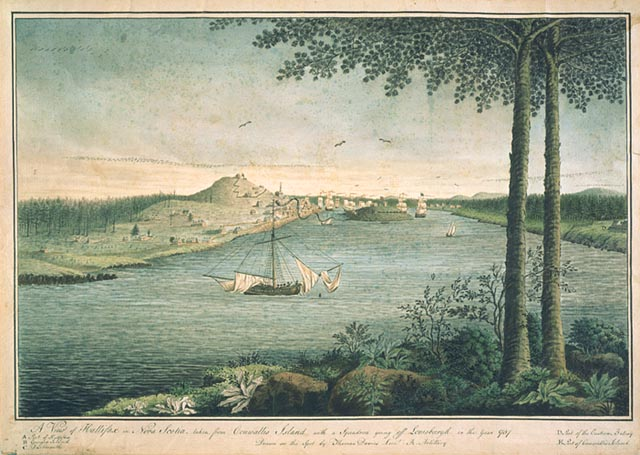
A View of Halifax, Louisbourg Expedition, c. 1757

Yale died on September 13, 1760. His wife died at the home of her son-in-law named Joseph Hough, in Wallingford, on November 28, 1795, at 94 years of age. They had 7 children.

- Elihu Yale (1703-1745), became a soldier in the Louisbourg Expedition against the French, and died at Cape Breton Island, Nova Scotia. He was the father of Stephen Yale, the great-grandfather of William H. Yale, and served in the 10th Connecticut Militia Regiment during the Revolutionary War.
- Samuel Yale (1711-1754), married Scottish Susannah Abernethy and became a wealthy farmer, leaving a large estate; he was the father of Street Yale, a Patriot who fought in the Revolutionary War. His grandson Samuel Yale was also a patriot and became the first manufacturer in Meriden, Connecticut in 1791. He was the patriarch of the Yale family manufacturing dynasty of Connecticut. Members included merchant William Yale, Senator Charles D. Yale, Edwin R. Yale, merchant Henry Clay Yale, Yale merchant William H. Yale, Yale spy William Yale, CIA Director of Finance Thomas B. Yale.
- Theophilus Yale (1714-1759), became the father of Elihu Yale, a wealthy merchant who was among the first bayonet manufacturers of Connecticut. Yale became the uncle of Canadian fur merchant James Murray Yale, and grandfather of New York media magnate Moses Yale Beach. Members of this branch included NYC's first subway builder Alfred Ely Beach, politician Arthur Yale, politician Moses S. Beach, inventor Frederick C. Beach, aviation pioneer Stanley Yale Beach, Brewster Yale Beach.
- Sarah Yale (1716-1784), became the wife of Joshua Atwater, and the great-grandmother of abolitionist Congressman Sherlock James Andrews, who was a graduate from Yale and the 1st President of the Cleveland Bar Association. He was also the son-in-law of Congressman John W. Allen, Mayor of Cleveland, and was related to the Griswold family and the Clay family.

Divan Berry Yale, father of Linus Yale Sr., of the Yale Lock Company, was Yale's great-grandnephew, being a descendant of one of his brothers. Members of this branch included inventor Linus Yale Jr., railroad builder Julian L. Yale, Rockefeller partner George W. Gardner, abolitionist Barnabas Yale, golfer John Deere Cady, baseball owner William Yale Giles, and others.
