= Tom Cobley Tavern =

Pub in Spreyton, Devon, England

Coordinates: 50.7558°N 3.8476°W

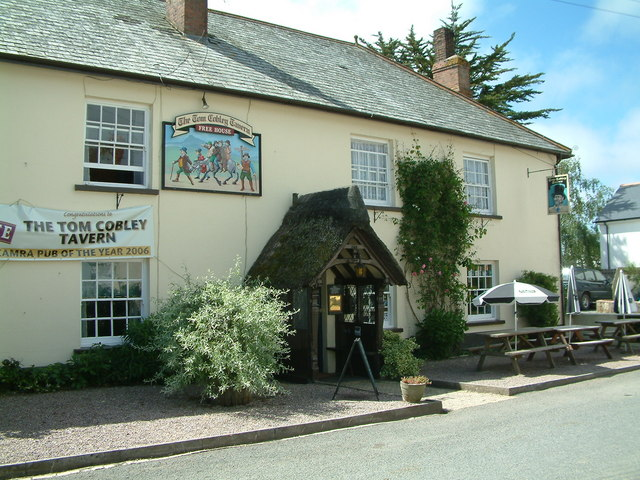
Tom Cobley Tavern, Spreyton, Devon

The Tom Cobley Tavern is a pub in Spreyton, Devon, England. It dates back to the 16th century, and may be the 1802 starting point of Uncle Tom Cobley and his companions for the journey to Widecombe Fair, in the well-known folk song. It was CAMRA's National Pub of the Year for 2006, and a finalist in 2012.

== History ==
The pub dates back to the 16th century, and was renamed in the 1950s to capitalise on Spreyton's connection to Uncle Tom Cobley. On the pub's website, it is stated that the famous song is based on a journey that Tom Cobley and his companions took to Widecombe Fair in 1802, starting out from the pub. According to the BBC, local history research does support this account.

It was CAMRA's National Pub of the Year for 2006. It was Pub of the Year for Exeter and East Devon, and one of four national finalists in the competition for 2012, which was won by The Baum, Rochdale.
