= Fat Cat =

Fat cat is a slang term for a wealthy person, originally used to describe a rich political donor.

Fat Cat may also refer to:

- Fat Cat (singer), (born; 1990) a South Korean singer, also known as Defconn Girl
- Fat Cat, Norwich, a pub in Norwich, England
- Fat Cat Brewery, a brewery in Norwich, England
- Suicide of Fat Cat, the death of a 20-year-old Chinese gamer.
- FatCat Records, a British record label
- Fat Cat, a sandwich offered at the Grease trucks in New Brunswick, NJ
- Fat Cat, the main character of the Australian television show Fat Cat and Friends and the mascot of the Channel Seven Perth Telethon
- Fat Cat, a character in the animated series Chip 'n Dale Rescue Rangers
- An obese cat
