= Widecombe Fair (song) =

Devon folk song

Song
- Genre: Folk

"Widecombe Fair", also called "Tom Pearce" (sometimes spelt "Tam Pierce"), is a Devon folk song about a man called Tom Pearce, whose horse dies after someone borrows it to travel to the fair in Widecombe with his friends. Its chorus ends with a long list of the people travelling to the fair: "Bill Brewer, Jan Stewer, Peter Gurney, Peter Davy, Dan'l Whiddon, Harry Hawke, Old Uncle Tom Cobley and all." Some research suggests that the names originally referred to real people.

As the last name in a long list, "Uncle Tom Cobley and all" has come to be used as a humorous colloquialism meaning "anyone and everyone", with an underlying implication that there are too many people involved. One interpretation of the song is that it describes "too many people borrowing and riding a single horse to attend the fair, resulting in the poor creature's death and the unfortunate gang haunting the moor forever". In some references, the surname is spelt as "Cobleigh".

== History ==
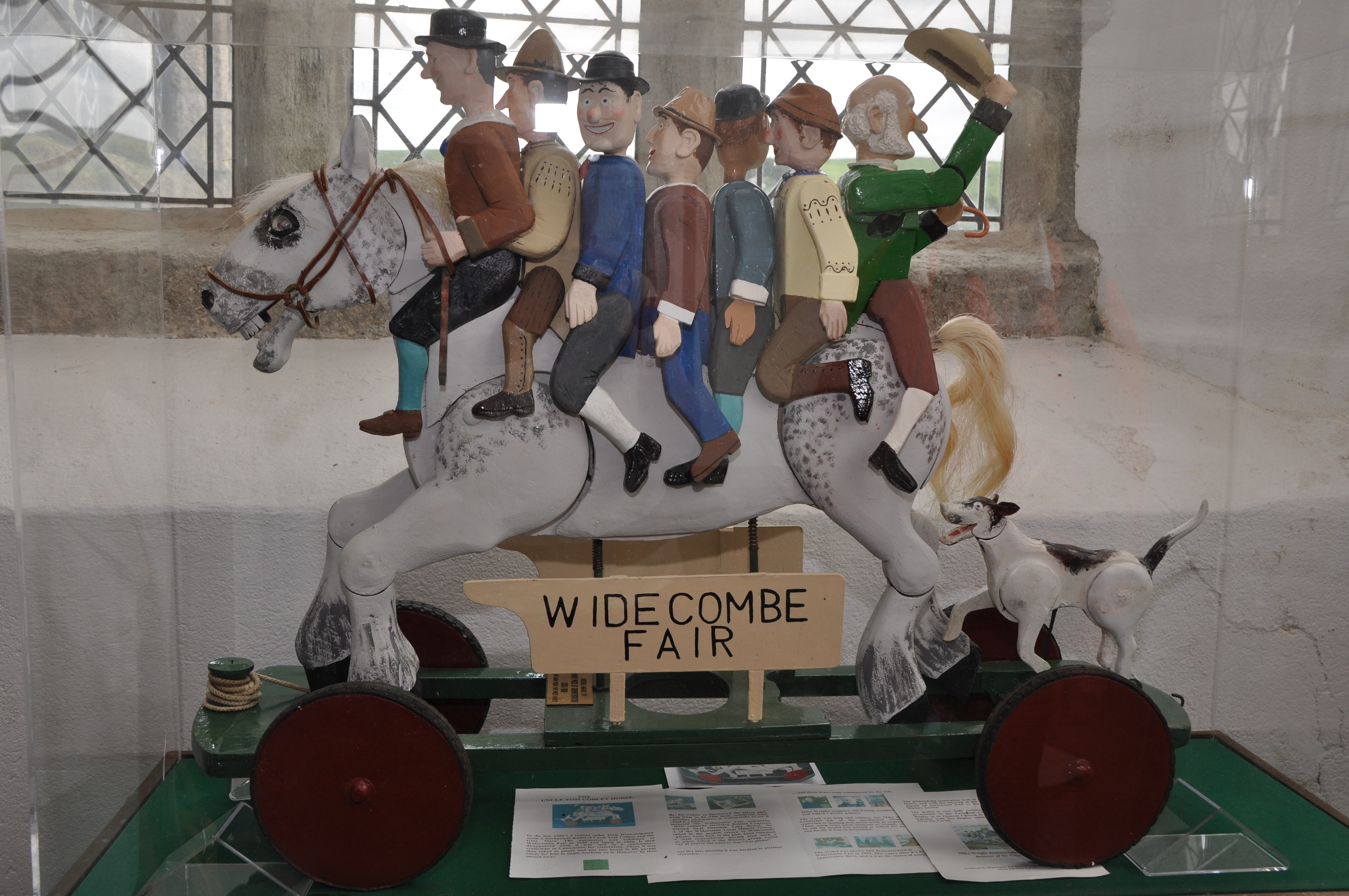
A painted wooden sculpture depicting the horse and its riders, displayed in Widecombe in the Moor's St Pancras church

The song was published by Sabine Baring-Gould in the book Songs and Ballads of the West (1889–1891) (referring to the West Country in England), though it also exists in variant forms. The title is spelt "Widdecombe Fair" in the original publication, though "Widecombe" is now the standard spelling of the village Widecombe in the Moor. On the His Master's Voice record 4-2123; mx. 12442e, by Charles Tree the title is spelt "Widdicombe Fair".

The ghostly 'Grey Mare' of the song may in fact refer to a lost folk custom similar to the Mari Lwyd or Hobby Horse of Welsh and Cornish tradition.

Local historians have tried to identify the characters in the song. Tony Beard, a member of a local history group that has researched the song, says "I'm convinced the characters were real people", concluding that they are likely to have been inhabitants of the Spreyton area and that the song may commemorate an event that happened in 1802.

== Versions ==
Mr Charles Tree, Baritone, recorded "Widdicombe Fair" (composer credit: "Heath") twice for the Gramophone Company (later labelled "His Master's Voice"), initially in October 1910. (He also recorded it for the foreign Favorite label (No.65046), as well as a shortened version for French Pathe (60171), about the same time). The original Gramophone Company recording of 1910 (12442e) was superseded in May 1915 with a new recording (HO 1522 ab) but keeping the same catalogue number (G.C.4-2123).

A comic version with dramatic dialogue spoken by the characters, including Mrs Pearce, was recorded in 1930 by the Regal Dramatic players. A review in Gramophone says it is "played with spirit and indeterminate dialect". A straight version was also recorded by Raymond Newell. In 1932 Newell also appeared in Columbia on Parade, a record which included a version with other British singing stars at the time, who replaced the familiar list of names with their own.

It was recorded by Burl Ives on 11 February 1941 for his debut album Okeh Presents the Wayfaring Stranger, introduced with a spoken explanation of the ghostly aspects of the song. Since then, it has been recorded by many others, including Paul Austin Kelly and Jon Pertwee in the persona of Worzel Gummidge.

In a 1967 episode of the radio series Round the Horne, Kenneth Williams in character as Rambling Syd Rumpo performed a parody version called "Ganderpoke Bog" (introduced as "The Somerset Nog"), with the long list of people in the chorus being "Len Possett, Tim Screevy, The Reverend Phipps, Peg Leg Loombucket, Solly Levy, Ginger Epstein, Able Seaman Trufitt, Scotch Lil, Messrs Cattermole, Mousehabit, Neapthigh and Trusspot (solicitors and Commissioners for Oaths), Father Thunderghast, Fat Alice, Con Mahoney, Yeti Rosencrantz, Foo Too Robinson and Uncle Ted Willis and all". (Con Mahoney was at the time Head of the BBC Light Programme).

George Adamson, who lived for many years in Devon, illustrated the song as a picture book for children with the title Widdecombe Fair. First published by Faber and Faber in 1966, Adamson later converted his drawings into a lively poster. The Tablet noted that "George Adamson has drawn a set of earthy characters to ride Tom Pearse's grey mare in the famous West Country song that are so obviously just right for their names. The colours are sombre, but there is humour and sly detail to delight an observant child".

In 1964, The Nashville Teens released a rock version of the song - with abridged lyrics and new music - on their album Tobacco Road. A similar but much longer version was performed in 1970 by an early incarnation of Renaissance (some of whose members had previously been in The Nashville Teens) on a German TV program Muzik-Kanal, as seen on the DVD Kings & Queens (released in 2010).

In a 1973 episode of The Benny Hill Show, the fictional Dalton Abbott Railway Choir performed a parody of the song with the names in the chorus taken from the railway duty roster.

Tavistock Goosey Fair composed in 1912 is likely influenced by Widecombe Fair.

The Devon duo Show of Hands wrote a sinister ballad, also called "Widecombe Fair", about a young man who separates from his older companions and is murdered, which leaves off where the original folk song begins: "Tom, Tom, lend me your grey mare, I want to go back to Widecombe Fair..."

The lyrics to the song appeared in the graphic story The Devil's Footprints, written by Marcus Moore and illustrated by Eddie Campbell. The story showcases many elements of Devon folklore, with the song as its centre piece. It was originally published in the Heavy Metal magazine's 20th Anniversary Hardcover (1997), later reprinted in Eddie Campbell's Bacchus.

== The song lyrics, in full ==
Tom Pearce, Tom Pearce, lend me your grey mare.
All along, down along, out along lea.
For I want for to go to Widecombe Fair,
With Bill Brewer, Jan Stewer, Peter Gurney,
Peter Davy, Dan'l Whiddon, Harry Hawke,
Old Uncle Tom Cobley and all,
Old Uncle Tom Cobley and all.

And when shall I see again my grey mare?
All along, down along, out along lea.
By Friday soon, or Saturday noon,
With Bill Brewer, Jan Stewer, Peter Gurney,
Peter Davy, Dan'l Whiddon, Harry Hawke,
Old Uncle Tom Cobley and all,
Old Uncle Tom Cobley and all.

So they harnessed and bridled the old grey mare.
All along, down along, out along lea.
And off they drove to Widecombe fair,
With Bill Brewer, Jan Stewer, Peter Gurney,
Peter Davy, Dan'l Whiddon, Harry Hawke,
Old Uncle Tom Cobley and all,
Old Uncle Tom Cobley and all.

Then Friday came, and Saturday noon.
All along, down along, out along lea.
But Tom Pearce's old mare hath not trotted home,
With Bill Brewer, Jan Stewer, Peter Gurney,
Peter Davy, Dan'l Whiddon, Harry Hawke,
Old Uncle Tom Cobley and all,
Old Uncle Tom Cobley and all.

So Tom Pearce, he got up to the top o' the hill.
All along, down along, out along lea.
And he seed his old mare down a-making her will,
With Bill Brewer, Jan Stewer, Peter Gurney,
Peter Davy, Dan'l Whiddon, Harry Hawke,
Old Uncle Tom Cobley and all,
Old Uncle Tom Cobley and all.

So Tom Pearce’s old mare, her took sick and died.
All along, down along, out along lea.
And Tom he sat down on a stone, and he cried
With Bill Brewer, Jan Stewer, Peter Gurney,
Peter Davy, Dan'l Whiddon, Harry Hawke,
Old Uncle Tom Cobley and all,
Old Uncle Tom Cobley and all.

But this isn't the end o' this shocking affair.
All along, down along, out along lea.
Nor, though they be dead, of the horrid career
Of Bill Brewer, Jan Stewer, Peter Gurney,
Peter Davy, Dan'l Whiddon, Harry Hawke,
Old Uncle Tom Cobley and all,
Old Uncle Tom Cobley and all.

When the wind whistles cold on the moor of the night.
All along, down along, out along lea.
Tom Pearce's old mare doth appear ghastly white,
With Bill Brewer, Jan Stewer, Peter Gurney,
Peter Davy, Dan'l Whiddon, Harry Hawke,
Old Uncle Tom Cobley and all,
Old Uncle Tom Cobley and all.

And all the long night be heard skirling and groans.
All along, down along, out along lea.
From Tom Pearce’s old mare in her rattling bones,
With Bill Brewer, Jan Stewer, Peter Gurney,
Peter Davy, Dan'l Whiddon, Harry Hawke,
Old Uncle Tom Cobley and all,
Old Uncle Tom Cobley and all.
