= Colebrooke, Devon =

Village in Devon, England

Coordinates: 50.78648°N 3.74627°W

Colebrooke
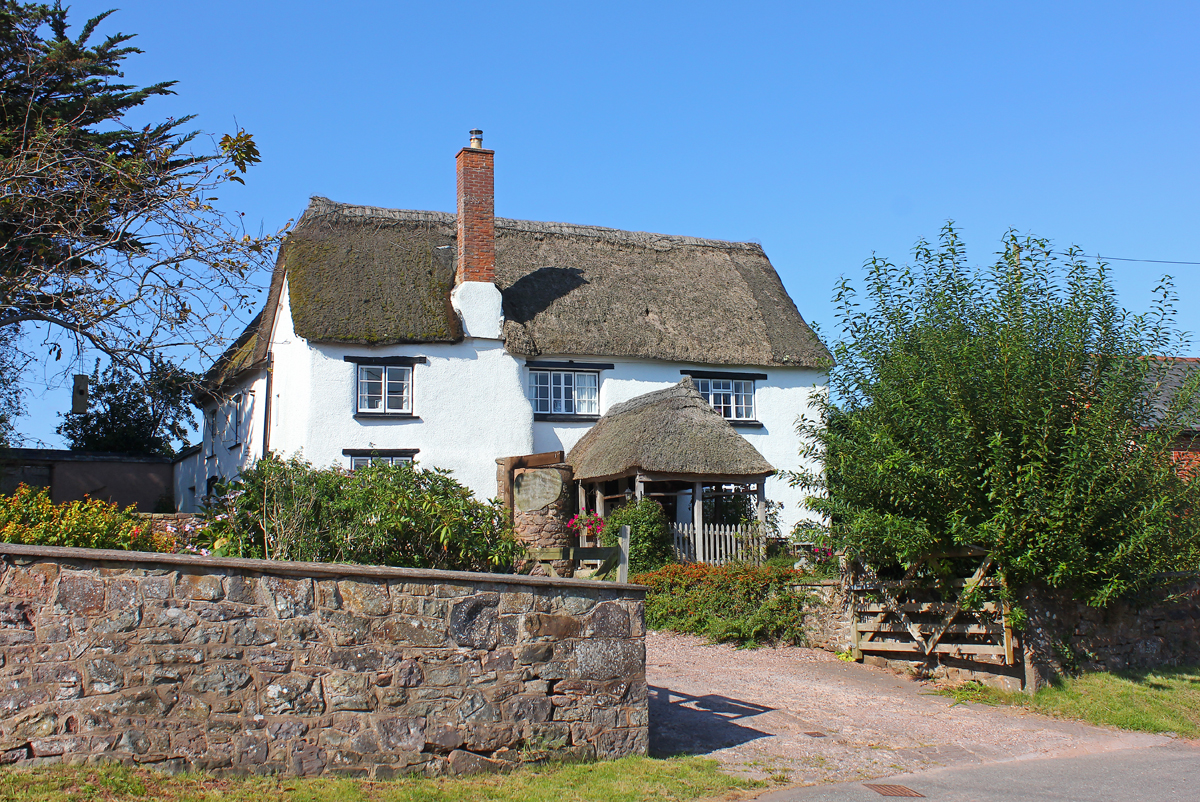

- Location within Devon
- Population: 445 (2021 census)
- OS grid reference: SS770000
- District: Mid Devon
- Shire county: Devon
- Region: South West
- Country: England
- Sovereign state: United Kingdom
- Police: Devon and Cornwall
- Fire: Devon and Somerset
- Ambulance: South Western

Colebrooke is a village and parish in Devon, England about 5 miles (8.0 km) west of Crediton. The main point of interest is the church and the connection to Henry Kingsley's novel The Recollections of Geoffry Hamlyn. Also Uncle Tom Cobley, of the folk song, signed his will at Pascoe House, but is buried 4 miles west at Spreyton. The champion Devon wrestler, Abraham Cann was born and buried here. He won the all-comers wrestling crown in London.

Colebrooke gave its name to Colebrook, Connecticut, United States.

== Roman road ==
The remains of the agger can be seen in a field some 300 metres south of Rag Lane and just to the east of Five Acre Copse. This is also clearly visible from aerial views accessible online. The road follows the same line all the way from North Tawton to this point where the route becomes less obvious. A rather straight lane along the ridge of hills to the east of the railway line is suggestive of its line.

== Other History ==
Colebrooke is also the supposed site of a Roman fort or marching camp just outside the village to the East. However, there is no evidence for this and it appears to refer to a square field that used to sit astride a straight run of hedgerows that was mistakenly identified as the course of the Roman road to Exeter in the 1980s (see 'Devon's Past an Aerial View' by Frances Griffith ISBN 0 86114-833-9). Two of this field's hedgerows have since been removed.

== Historic estates ==
=== Coplestone ===
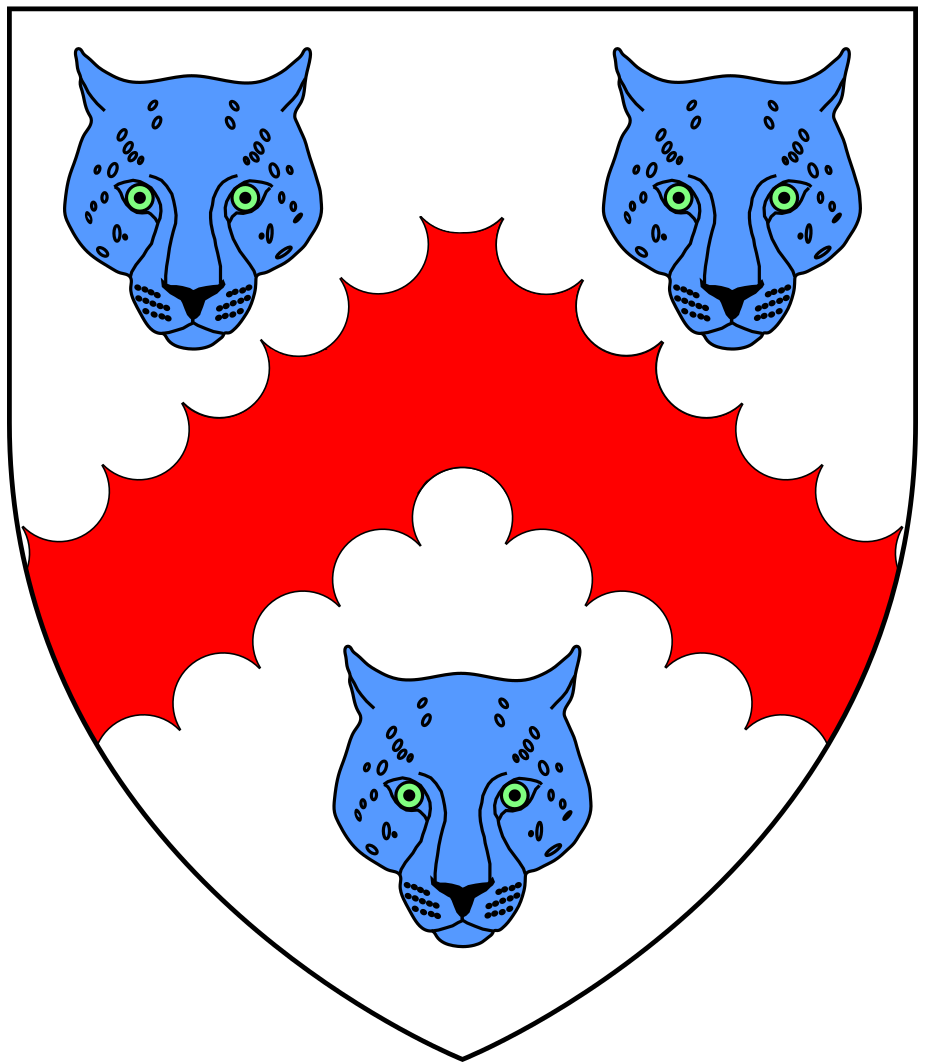
Arms of Copleston: Argent, a chevron engrailed gules between three leopard's faces azure

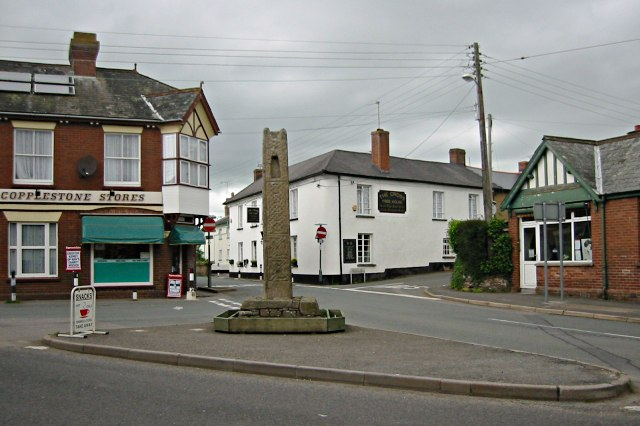
Coplestone Cross

The Coplestone (or "Copplestone", "Copleston" etc.) family took its name from the manor of Copleston in the parish of Colebrooke. Pole (d.1635) states that the earliest record of this family he was able to find was in a deed dated during the reign of King Edward II (1307-1327). The great antiquity of this family thus seems somewhat overstated in the traditional Devon rhyme, dismissed by Hoskins as containing "not a word of truth":

"Crocker, Cruwys and Copplestone,
When The Conqueror came were all at home".

Several junior branches of the Copleston family existed seated at Eggesford, Bowden, Instow Upton Pyne, Kingdon and Woodland. Copleston Cross, the surviving shaft of a late Saxon large 10 foot high granite stone cross, named after the estate of Coplestone, is situated on the main Exeter to Barnstaple road at the junction of the parishes of Colebrooke, Crediton and Down St Mary. Coplestone House was the seat of the Coplestone family from the 13th century to 1659 and the surviving Georgian house was rebuilt on a new site in 1787 by its then owner Robert Madge.

=== Horwell ===
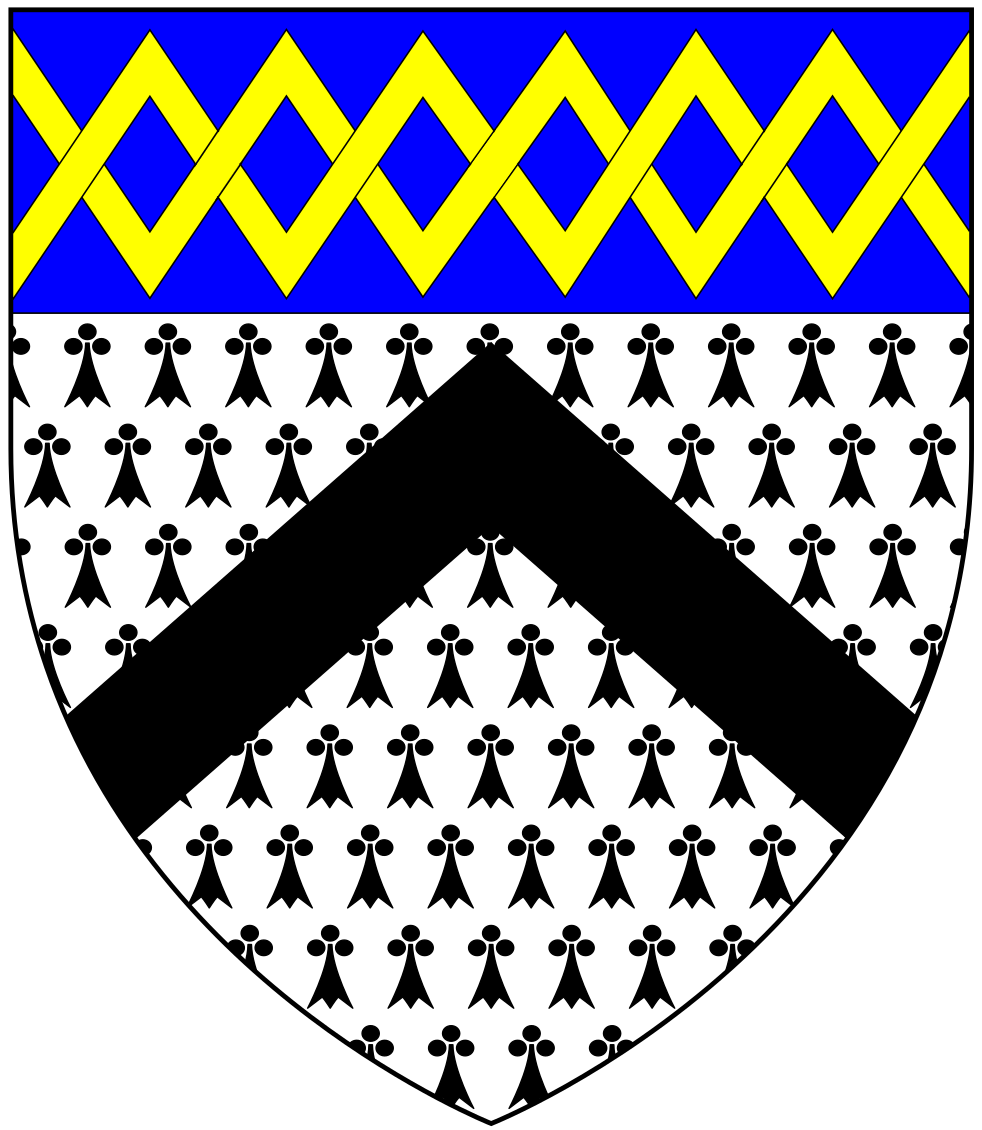
Arms of Prye family of Horwell in the parish of Colebrooke, Devon: Ermine, a chevron sable a chief azure fretty or

Horwell was the residence from the 16th century of the Prye (or Pryce) family, one of the old armigerous gentry families of Devon which made a return in the 1620 Heraldic Visitations of Devon. Their armorials were: Ermine, a chevron gules (or sable according to Pole) a chief azure fretty or. According to Risdon (d.1640): "In this family one thing is remarkable that although they have continued many generations yet was it never known to have brought forth a younger brother until this our age, insomuch as the name is nowhere to be heard of but in only this place". The present house known as Horwell Barton has an early 19th-century facade.

== Church of St Andrew ==
In the parish church of St Andrew there is a mural monument to Elizabeth Mills (d. 27 September 1667), daughter of John Mills of Colebrooke, with Corinthian columns and scrollwork pediment. She was the wife of Sir John Coryton, 1st Baronet (c 1621 - 1680).

== Demographics ==
Census population of Colebrooke, Devon parish
Census	Population	Female	Male	Households	Source
2001	468	229	239	187	
2011	461	233	228	191	
2021	445	230	215	181	
