= Bridge Inn =

Bridge Inn may refer to:

- Bridge Inn, Topsham, Grade II listed public house at Bridge Hill, Topsham, Devon, England
- Bridge End Inn, pub in Ruabon, Wales
- Trent Bridge Inn, pub in Nottingham, England
