= National Pub of the Year =

Annual competition held by CAMRA in the UK

The Tamworth Tap, Tamworth, Staffordshire is the current award-holder.

The National Pub of the Year is awarded annually by the Campaign for Real Ale (CAMRA). Established in 1988, the competition highlights pubs around the UK that are worth seeking out. Each local CAMRA branch nominates one pub in their area, which then go through to a regional competition, with four pubs going on to the national final.

Pubs are evaluated on:

- Quality of the real ales served
- Value for money
- Atmosphere
- Interior decoration
- Customer service and welcome

== Winners ==
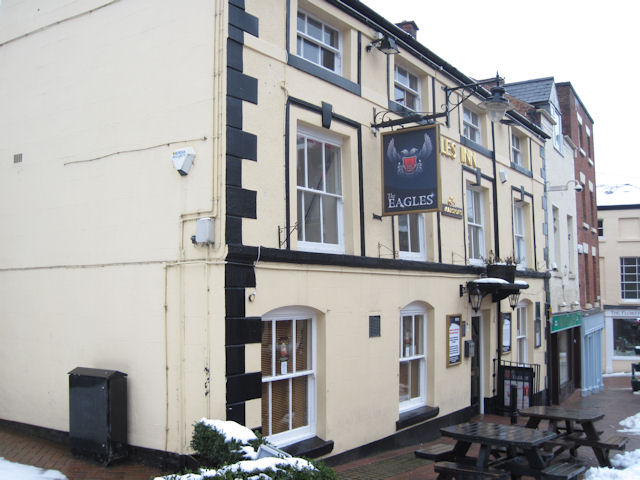
The Bailey Head, Oswestry (pictured under previous name) won in 2024

Until 1998 the date of the award was for the year of the announcement of the winner. From 1998 onwards the date of the award is the year that the award was judged and it is awarded at the start of the following year. As a result the Volunteer Arms, Musselburgh was announced as the 1998 winner in April 1998 and the Fat Cat, Norwich was announced as the 1998 winner at the start of 1999.

- 2025: The Tamworth Tap, Tamworth, Staffordshire (third win)
- 2024: The Bailey Head, Oswestry
- 2023: The Tamworth Tap, Tamworth, Staffordshire (second win)
- 2022: The Tamworth Tap, Tamworth, Staffordshire
- 2021: Competition cancelled due to COVID-19 pandemic
- 2020: Competition cancelled due to COVID-19 pandemic
- 2019: The Bell Inn, Aldworth, Berkshire (second win)
- 2018: Wonston Arms, Wonston, Hampshire
- 2017: Cricketers Arms, St Helens, Merseyside
- 2016: George & Dragon, Hudswell, North Yorkshire
- 2015: Sandford Park Alehouse, Cheltenham, Gloucestershire
- 2014: The Salutation Inn, Ham, Gloucestershire
- 2013: The Swan with Two Necks, Pendleton, Lancashire
- 2012: The Baum, Rochdale, Greater Manchester
- 2011: The Bridge End Inn, Ruabon, Wrexham
- 2010: The Harp, Charing Cross, London
- 2009: The Kelham Island Tavern, Sheffield, South Yorkshire (second win)
- 2008: The Kelham Island Tavern, Sheffield, South Yorkshire
- 2007: Old Spot Inn, Hill Road, Dursley, Gloucestershire
- 2006: Tom Cobley Tavern, Spreyton, Devon
- 2005: The Swan, Little Totham, Essex (second win)
- 2004: The Fat Cat, Norwich, Norfolk (second win)
- 2003: The Crown & Thistle, Gravesend, Kent
- 2002: The Swan, Little Totham, Essex
- 2001: The Nursery Inn, Heaton Norris, Greater Manchester
- 2000: Blisland Inn, Blisland, Cornwall
- 1999: The Rising Sun, Tipton, West Midlands
- 1998: The Fat Cat, Norwich, Norfolk
- 1998: The Volunteer Arms, (Staggs Bar), Musselburgh, East Lothian
- 1997: The Sair Inn, Linthwaite, Huddersfield, West Yorkshire
- 1996: Halfway House, Pitney, Somerset
- 1995: Coalbrookdale Inn, Coalbrookdale, Shropshire
- 1994: Beamish Mary Inn, No Place, between Stanley and Beamish, Co Durham
- 1993: Three Kings, Hanley Castle, Worcestershire & The Fishermans Tavern, Broughty Ferry, Angus
- 1992: (No Result)
- 1991: Great Western, Wolverhampton, West Midlands
- 1990: The Bell Inn, Aldworth, Berkshire
- 1989: Cap & Feathers, Tillingham, Essex
- 1988: The Boars Head, Kinmuck, Aberdeenshire

== Final Four winners ==
Each year, a super-regional round whittles down the Regional Winners to a Final 4 Round

=== 2025 ===
2025 Final Four
Blackfriars Tavern, Great Yarmouth
Pelican Inn, Gloucester
Tamworth Tap, Tamworth
Volunteer Arms (Staggs)

=== 2024 ===
2024 Final Four
Black Horse, Preston
Little Green Dragon, Winchmore Hill
Three B’s, Bridlington
Bailey Head, Oswestry

=== 2023 ===
2023 Final Four
Beer Engine, Skipton
Trafalgar Hotel, Ramsey, Isle of Mann
Nelson Arms, Tonbridge
Tamworth Tap, Tamworth

== Regional winners ==
=== 2024 ===
Region	Pub Name	Location
Central Southern	Bell Inn, Aldworth	Aldworth
East Anglia	Blackfriars Tavern, Great Yarmouth	Great Yarmouth
East Midlands	Horse and Jockey, Stapleford	Stapleford, Nottinghamshire
Greater London	Little Green Dragon, Winchmore Hill	Winchmore Hill
Greater Manchester	Northumberland Arms, Marple Bridge	Marple Bridge
Kent	Nelson Arms, Tonbridge	Tonbridge
Merseyside/Cheshire/North Wales	Turks Head, St Helens	St Helens, Merseyside
North East	Grey Horse, Consett	Consett
Scotland	Hillend Tavern, Dalgety Bay	Dalgety Bay
Northern Ireland	Dog and Duck, Lisbellaw	Lisbellaw
Wales	Cresselly Arms, Cresswell Quay	Cresswell Quay
South West	Crossways Inn, West Huntspill	West Huntspill
Surrey/Sussex	Brickmakers Alehouse, Bexhill on Sea	Bexhill-on-Sea
Wessex	Woodman Inn, Bridport	Bridport
West Midlands	Bailey Head, Oswestry	Oswestry
West Pennines	Black Horse, Preston	Preston, Lancashire
Yorkshire	Three B’s, Bridlington	Bridlington

=== 2022 ===
Region	Pub Name	Location
Central Southern	Bell	Waltham St Lawrence, Berkshire
East Anglia	King's Head	Norwich, Norfolk
East Midlands	Horse & Jockey	Stapleford, Nottinghamshire
Greater London	Hop Inn	Hornchurch, London
Greater Manchester	Real Crafty	Wigan, Manchester
Kent	Larkins Alehouse	Cranbook, Kent
Merseyside/Cheshire/North Wales	Magazine Hotel	New Brighton, Wallasey, Merseyside
North East	Station House	Durham, Northumberland
Scotland/Northern Ireland	Commercial Inn	Dunfermline, Fife
Wales	Mold Ale House	Mold
South West	Pelican Inn	Gloucester
Surrey/Sussex	Hornet Alehouse	Chichester
Wessex	Olaf's Tun	Southampton, Hampshire
West Midlands	Tamworth Tap	Tamworth, Staffordshire
West Pennines	Fifteens at St Annes	St Annes
Yorkshire	Heaven & Ale	Barnsley

=== 2017 ===
Region	Pub Name	Location
Central Southern	The Cross Key	Thame, Oxfordshire
East Anglia	The Stanford Arms	Lowestoft, Suffolk
East Midlands	Old Oak Inn	Horsley Woodhouse, Derbyshire
Greater London	The Hope	Carshalton, London
Greater Manchester	The Baum	Rochdale, Manchester
Kent	The Rifle Volunteers	Maidstone, Kent
Merseyside/Cheshire/North Wales	The Cricketer's Arms	St Helens, Merseyside
North East	The Steamboat	South Shields, South Tyneside
Scotland/Northern Ireland	Staggs Bar	Musselburgh, East Lothian
Wales	Arvon Ale House	Llandrindod Wells, Powys
South West	The Salutation	Ham, Gloucestershire
Surrey/Sussex	Brooksteed Alehouse	Worthing, West Sussex
Wessex	The Bottle Inn	Marshwood, Dorset
West Midlands	The Earl Grey Inn	Leek, Staffordshire
West Pennines	The Swan with two necks	Pendleton, Lancashire
Yorkshire	George and Dragon	Hudswell, North Yorkshire

=== 2011 ===
Region	Pub Name	Location
Central Southern	Radnor Arms	Coleshill, Oxfordshire
East Anglia	Engineers Arms	Henlow, Bedfordshire
East Midlands	Crown	Beeston, Nottinghamshire
Greater London	Southampton Arms	Highgate Road, London
Greater Manchester	Magnet	Stockport
Kent	Flower Pot	Maidstone
Merseyside/Cheshire/North Wales	Bridge End Inn	Ruabon, Wrexham County Borough
North East	Boathouse Inn	Wylam, Northumberland
Scotland/Northern Ireland	Fox and Hounds	Houston, Renfrewshire
South/Mid Wales	Ancient Briton	Pen-y-cae, Powys
South West	The Front	Falmouth, Cornwall
Surrey/Sussex	Evening Star	Brighton
Wessex	Nog Inn	Wincanton
West Midlands	Beacon Hotel	Sedgley, West Midlands
West Pennines	Swan with Two Necks	Pendleton, Lancashire
Yorkshire	Jemmy Hirst at the Rose & Crown	Rawcliffe, East Riding of Yorkshire

=== 2010 ===
Region	Pub Name	Location
Scotland and Northern Ireland	Albert Tavern	Freuchie, Fife
North West	Taps	Lytham, Lancashire
North East	Surtees Arms	Ferryhill, County Durham
Greater Manchester	Knott Bar	Manchester
Merseyside, Cheshire and North Wales	Brewery Tap	Chester
Yorkshire	Ferry Boat	Thorganby, North Yorkshire
East Midlands	The Crown	Beeston, Nottinghamshire
West Midlands	Beacon Hotel	Sedgley, West Midlands
East Anglia	Dove	Bury St Edmunds, Suffolk
Kent	Flower Pot	Maidstone
Greater London	The Harp	Charing Cross
Surrey and Sussex	Royal Oak	Friday Street, near Rusper, West Sussex
South West	Salutation	Ham, near Berkeley, Gloucestershire
South and Mid Wales	Ship and Castle	Aberystwyth
Wessex and Channel Islands	Guide Dog	Bevois Valley, Southampton, Hampshire
Central Southern	The Bell	Aldworth, Berkshire

=== 2009 ===
Region	Pub Name	Location
Scotland and Northern Ireland	Albert Tavern	Freuchie, Fife
West Pennines	Taps	Lytham, Lancashire
North East	Boathouse Inn	Wylam, Northumberland
Greater Manchester	Crown Hotel	Worthington
Merseyside, Cheshire and North Wales	Golden Lion Inn	Llangynhafal, Denbighshire
Yorkshire	Kelham Island Tavern	Sheffield, South Yorkshire
East Midlands	Old Oak Inn	Horsley Woodhouse, Derbyshire
West Midlands	Cock Hotel	Wellington, Shropshire
East Anglia	Wheatsheaf	Writtle, Essex
Kent	Bull	Horton Kirby
Greater London	Bricklayer’s Arms	Putney
Surrey and Sussex	Royal Oak	Friday Street, near Rusper, West Sussex
South West	Old Spot	Dursley, Gloucestershire
South and Mid Wales	Severn Arms	Penybont
Wessex and Channel Islands	Prince of Wales	Farnborough, Hampshire
Central Southern	Royal Oak Inn	Wantage, Oxfordshire

=== 2008 ===
Region	Pub Name	Location
Scotland and Northern Ireland	Marine Hotel	Stonehaven, Grampian
West Pennines	Manor Arms	Broughton-in-Furness, Cumbria
North East	Kings Arms	Deptford, Sunderland, Tyne and Wear
Greater Manchester	Crown	Stockport
Merseyside, Cheshire and North Wales	Blue Bell	Halkyn, Flintshire
Yorkshire	Kelham Island Tavern	Sheffield, South Yorkshire
East Midlands	Arkwright Arms	Sutton cum Duckmanton, Derbyshire
West Midlands	Beacon Hotel	Sedgley
East Anglia	Chequers	Little Gransden, Cambridgeshire
Kent	Butchers Arms	Herne
London	Trafalgar	South Wimbledon
Surrey and Sussex	Royal Oak	Friday Street, near Rusper, West Sussex
South West	Tom Cobley Tavern	Spreyton, Devon
South and Mid Wales	Tafarn John y Gwas	Drefech-Felindre, West Wales
Wessex and Channel Islands	Red Lion Inn	Kilmington, Wiltshire
Central Southern	Royal Oak Inn	Wantage, Oxfordshire

=== 2007 ===
Region	Pub Name	Location
Scotland/N.I.	Blue Peter Hotel	Kirkcolm, Dumfries & Galloway
North West	Bridge Bier Huis	Burnley, Lancashire
North East	Kings Arms	Deptford, Sunderland, Tyne and Wear
Greater Manchester	The New Oxford	Salford
Merseyside/North Wales	Turks Head	St. Helens
Yorkshire	Kelham Island Tavern	Sheffield, South Yorkshire
East Midlands	Thorold Arms	Harmston, Lincolnshire
West Midlands	The Bell	Pensax, Worcestershire
East Anglia	Land of Liberty, Peace and Plenty	Heronsgate, Hertfordshire
Kent	Ship Centurion	Whitstable
London	Bricklayer’s Arms	Putney
Surrey/Sussex	White Horse	Maplehurst, West Sussex
South West	Old Spot Inn	Dursley, Gloucestershire
South Wales	Borough Arms	Neath, Glamorgan
Wessex	Plough Inn	Little London, Hampshire
Central Southern	Rose and Crown	Hawridge, Buckinghamshire

=== 2005 ===
Region	Pub Name	Location
Scotland/N.I.	Halfway House	Edinburgh
North West	Taps,	Lytham St Anne's, Lancashire
North East	Robin Hood	Jarrow, Tyne and Wear
Greater Manchester	Musketeer	Leigh
Merseyside/North Wales	Bhurtpore Inn	Aston, Cheshire
Yorkshire	Crown Inn	Manfield, North Yorkshire
East Midlands	Old Coach House	Southwell, Nottinghamshire
West Midlands	Jolly Crispin	Upper Gornal, West Midlands
East Anglia	The Swan	Little Totham, Essex
Kent	Shipwrights Arms	Faversham
London	Robin Hood & Little John	Bexleyheath
Surrey/Sussex	Evening Star	Brighton
South West	Check Inn	North Wroughton, Wiltshire
South Wales	Wern Fawr Inn	Ystalyfera, Swansea
Wessex	Boot Inn	Weymouth, Dorset
Central Southern	Bell	Aldworth, Buckinghamshire

=== 2004 ===
Region	Pub Name	Location
Scotland/N.I.		
North West		
North East		
Greater Manchester	Arden Arms	Stockport
Merseyside/North Wales	Beartown Tap	Congleton, Cheshire
Yorkshire	Kelham Island Tavern	Sheffield
East Midlands		
West Midlands	Olde Swan	Netherton, West Midlands
East Anglia	Engineers Arms	Henlow, Bedfordshire
Kent		
London		
Surrey/Sussex		
South West	New Inn	Halse, Somerset
South Wales		
Wessex	Queen's Hotel	Gosport, Hampshire
Central Southern		

== Runners-up ==
- 2010:
  - Taps, Lytham St Annes, Lancashire
  - Beacon Hotel, Sedgley, West Midlands
  - Salutation, Ham, near Berkeley, Gloucestershire
- 2009:
  - Royal Oak Inn, Wantage, Oxon
  - Crown Hotel, Worthington, Greater Manchester
  - Royal Oak, Friday Street, West Sussex
- 2008:
  - The Crown, Stockport, Greater Manchester
  - Tom Cobley Tavern, Spreyton, Devon
  - Royal Oak, Rusper, West Sussex
- 2007:
  - Turks Head, St Helens, Merseyside
  - Land of Liberty, Peace and Plenty, Heronsgate, Hertfordshire
  - Blue Peter Hotel, Kirkcolm, Dumfries & Galloway
- 2006:
  - Failford Inn, Failford, Ayrshire
  - West Riding Refreshment Rooms, Dewsbury railway station, Dewsbury, West Yorkshire
  - Dove Street Inn, Ipswich, East Anglia
- 2005:
  - The Check Inn, North Wroughton, Wiltshire
  - Old Coach House, Southwell, East Midlands
  - Robin Hood, Jarrow, Tyne & Wear
- 2004:
  - Arden Arms, Stockport, Greater Manchester
  - New Inn, Halse, Somerset
  - Olde Swan, Netherton, West Midlands
- 1998:
  - Brewery Arms, Keighley
  - Number 22, Darlington
  - Plough and Harrow, Monknash, Glamorgan
- 1997:
  - Blacksmith's Arms, Calbourne, Isle of Wight
  - Railway, Yorton, Shropshire
  - Pot Kiln, Frilsham, Berkshire
  - Boat Inn, Ashleworth, Gloucestershire

== See also ==
- Heritage pub
- List of public house topics
- Pub Design Awards
