= The Bell Inn, Aldworth =

Listed pub in West Berkshire, England

The Bell Inn
- The pub in 2012

General information
- Type: Public house; originally a house
- Location: Bell Lane, Aldworth, West Berkshire, England
- Coordinates: 51.5132°N 1.2006°W
- Year built: 15th century (or earlier)
- Renovated: 17th and 19th century (altered); 20th century (added)
- Owner: Independent

Design and construction
- Designations

Listed Building – Grade II
- Official name: The Bell Inn
- Designated: 3 June 1986
- Reference no.: 1117177

The Bell Inn is a Grade II listed pub on Bell Lane in Aldworth, a village in West Berkshire, England. The building originated as a house and dates from the 15th century or earlier, with later alterations and extensions. It is the only pub in Berkshire with a Grade II-listed interior and is included in the Campaign for Real Ale's National Inventory of Historic Pub Interiors, where it has a three-star rating. The pub has been owned and managed by the same family since the 18th century. It won CAMRA's National Pub of the Year award in 1990 and again in 2019.

== History ==
The building originated as a house and dates from the 15th century or earlier, with alterations made in the 17th and 19th centuries and an extension added in the 20th century.

On 3 June 1986, the Bell Inn was designated a Grade II listed building. It is the only pub in Berkshire with a Grade II-listed interior, which the Campaign for Real Ale (CAMRA) regards as being of "outstanding national historic importance", and it has been awarded three stars on the National Inventory of Historic Pub Interiors.

It won CAMRA's National Pub of the Year award in 1990 and again in 2019.

The Bell Inn has remained under the ownership and management of the same family since the 18th century. It is a free house and serves beers from several local breweries, as well as filled rolls. In 2022, James Macaulay established Aldworth Brewing Co., which operates from an outbuilding behind the pub. Sources describe the Bell Inn as being frequented by local residents and walkers using the nearby Ridgeway.

== Architecture ==
=== Exterior ===
The pub is a two-storey brick building with timber framing and a tiled roof. It has a long rectangular plan running east to west, with later additions at the north-east and north-west ends. Tradition holds that the building was originally a medieval hall house or manor house before its conversion to a public house. The roof is served by chimney stacks at the centre and both ends, and the south-facing frontage has a central entrance beneath a tiled porch, flanked by large multi-pane windows, with further multi-pane windows on the upper floor.

=== Interior ===
Internally, the pub retains two principal rooms: a larger panelled tap room with a quarry-tiled floor and an inglenook fireplace incorporating built-in seating, and a smaller L-shaped room. Much of the building's historic timber structure survives, and the room to the left of the entrance retains wooden wall panelling, likely dating from the 19th century or earlier, together with fixed benches. The servery is separated by sliding glazed partitions and serving hatches, while the only fittings at the bar are handpumps made of ebony installed in 1902. A 17th-century staircase survives at the rear of the building near the central chimney.
