= Beatrice Chase =

British writer

Beatrice Chase (5 July 1874 – 3 July 1955) was the pen name for a British writer known during the first half of the 20th century for her Dartmoor-based novels. Her real name was Olive Katharine Parr, and she claimed to be directly descended from William Parr, the brother of Katharine, the sixth wife of Henry VIII.

== Biography ==
Beatrice Chase was born as Olive Katherine Parr in Harrow on the Hill in 1874. Her father, Charles Parr, apparently died when she was young, and her mother was a lapsed Catholic. Both Olive and her younger sister Hilda were educated at the Convent of the Holy Child in Cavendish Square, and both were baptised Catholics and became Dominican Tertiaries. Olive also took the nun's vow of chastity.

Around 1900 she was helping the poor in London, when she contracted a lung disease, (Note: Variously described as "a severe attack of influenza" by Laver, tuberculosis by Chard, and a "bout of ill health" by Milton.) and her younger sister died. In 1901 she travelled to Devon to convalesce and spent time with her mother in the Dartmoor village of Widecombe-in-the-Moor. By 1908 she and her mother had bought a farm at Venton about 1 kilometre (0.6 mi) south-south-east of the village. She later wrote about the discovery of the property in a book A Book of Answered Prayers that she published as Olive Katharine Parr in 1915. They rented out the farm and its outbuildings, but retained a cottage in which they lived, and built an adjacent Roman Catholic chapel which was licensed as a public oratory by Dr. Charles Graham, the Bishop of Plymouth, and for which the sacrament was reserved in 1910 until it was universally withdrawn by the Vatican in 1920.

Her first book The Voice of the River was published under her real name by Routledge in 1903. She used her real name for seven more books before starting to use her Beatrice Chase pseudonym with The Heart of the Moor, published by Herbert Jenkins in 1914. From then on she tended to use her real name only for her factual and religious writings.

During the First World War, Chase formed a "Crusade for Moral Living" which attracted a large following. Soldiers in the trenches and their wives or fiancées at home would write to Chase at Venton, pledging to be "true to honour". In return, Chase prayed for their souls in her small chapel. She attempted to revive the crusade in World War Two, but had no success.

I am thinking to-night, of all you who are on the wrong side of my hills. I ache, with a longing which is absolute pain, to draw you all into this old-world haven of peace.

— Beatrice Chase: opening words of The Dartmoor Window Again (1918)

She was often to be seen sitting at her writing desk, beside her favourite window which provided the titles for three of her books. Here she wrote many novels and also poetry. Her passion for Dartmoor is evident in her writing and she was often referred to as 'My Lady of the Moor' following the publication of John Oxenham's novel in which she was the heroine. The book was called My Lady of the Moor, and she adopted the title.

Chase was initially welcoming to devotees of her work to her home at Venton, where she was happy to show them round and sell them signed copies of her books, but in later life she tired of them and erected notices on her property ordering "trippers" not to call. The popularity of her fiction declined and in 1930 she decided to become a photographer: she produced a series of postcards of Dartmoor views for Raphael Tuck & Sons, (Note: This series of postcards was known as the "Beatrice Chase Dartmoor Snapshot Series".) and a book of 41 of her "Dartmoor Snapshots" was published in 1931.

As she grew older she vigorously campaigned to protect the moor from modern developments – particularly its use by the British Army – selling many of her possessions to fund this. She lived alone at Venton until 1954 when, aged 79 or 80, she was taken to hospital under the provisions of the National Assistance Act 1948 as a person in need of care and attention. Locals tell a story that she was taken to hospital in a straitjacket, but only after the loaded revolver she kept by her bed was removed.

Chase died at Newton Abbot Infirmary on 3 July 1955 and was buried in the churchyard at Widecombe-in-the-Moor. The granite cross on her grave is inscribed with "Beatrice Chase 1874–1955" on one side and "Pray for Olive Katharine Parr" on the other. It was erected in 1959 and is a reduced-size copy of Nun's Cross.

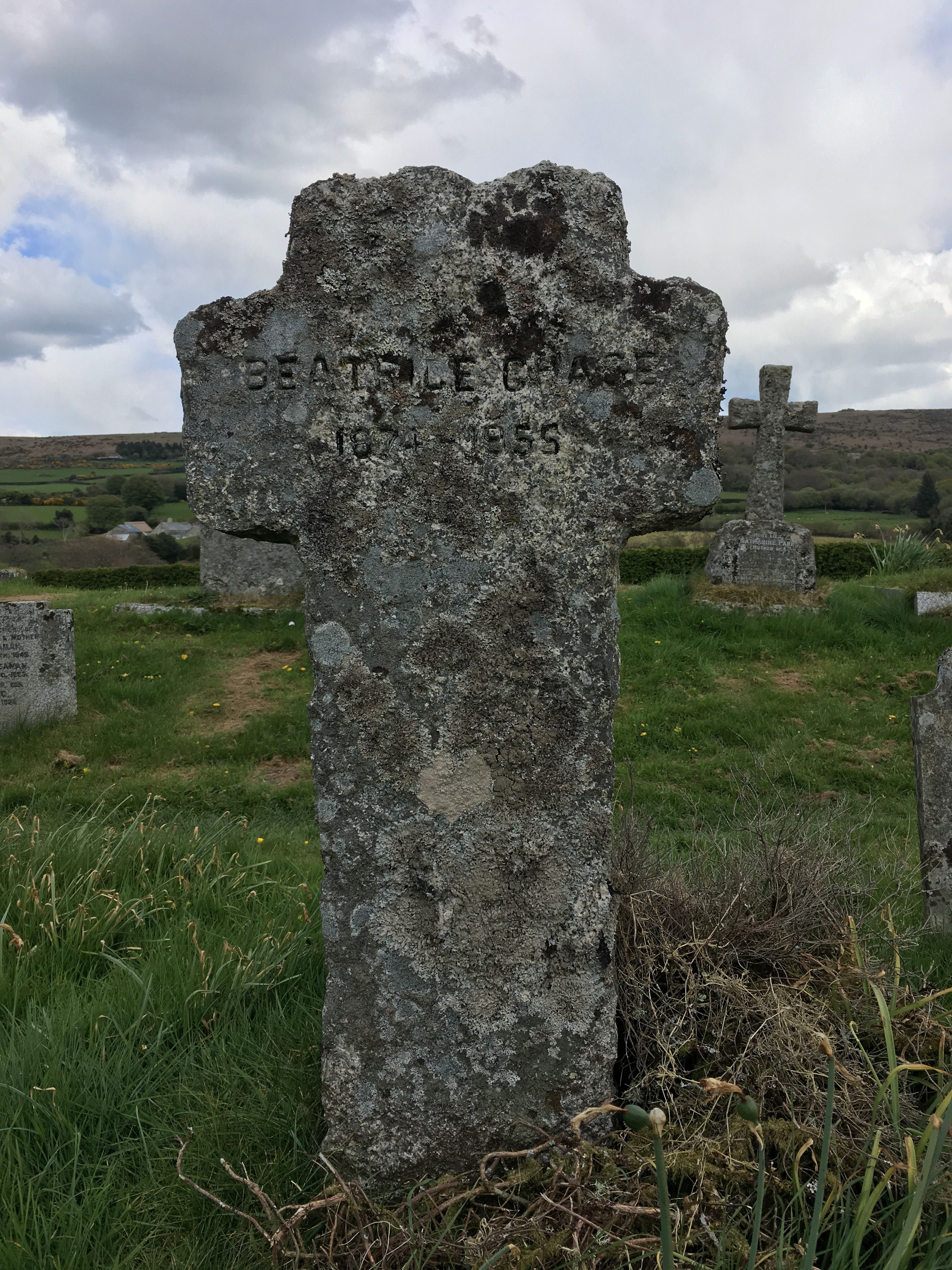
The grave of Beatrice Chase in the churchyard of St Pancras, Widecombe-in-the-Moor

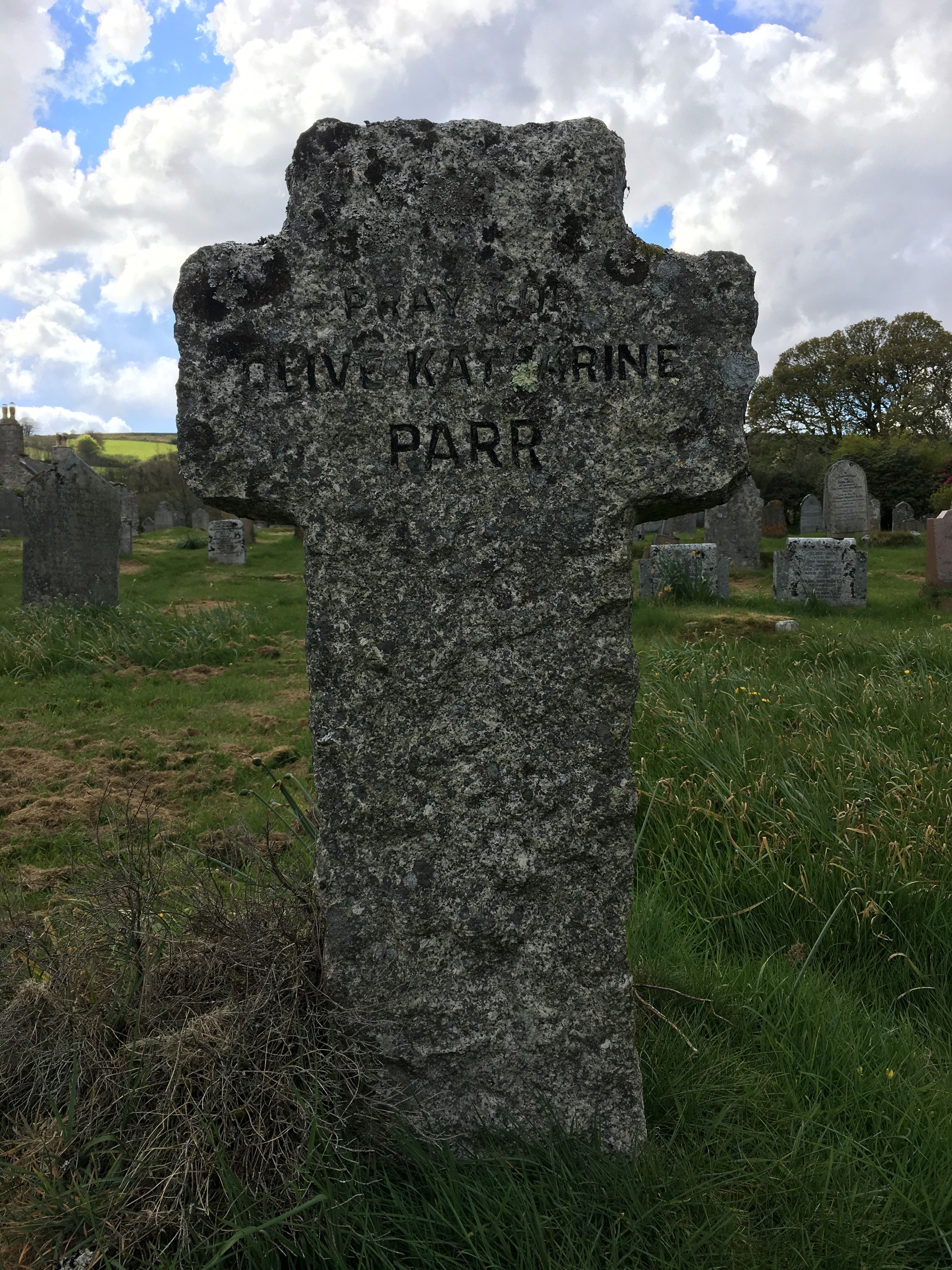
The other side of the grave of Beatrice Chase

== Legacy ==
Since the second half of the 20th century, Chase's writing style has been seen as outdated and her novels have been described as containing "cardboard characters [that] move stiffly through stereotypical scenes ... uttering trite phrases of deplorable sentimentality". However, her descriptions of life on Dartmoor at the turn of the 20th century are seen as valuable.

In her last book The Dartmoor Window Forty years On (1948) she claimed to have started the tradition of Uncle Tom Cobley appearing in a smock-frock at the annual Widecombe Fair, (Note: Chase wrote that she presented a genuine Norfolk smock-frock to Mr. Dunn which gave him the idea of impersonating Tom Cobley.) and today she is credited as the person who instigated the practice of leaving fresh flowers on Jay's Grave.

== Selected publications ==
As Beatrice Chase:

- 1914 The Heart of the Moor
- 1915 Through a Dartmoor Window
- 1917 Gorse Blossoms from Dartmoor (poetry)
- 1918 The Dartmoor Window Again
- 1920 Pages of Peace from Dartmoor

== Sources ==
- Chard, Judy (1994). The Mysterious Lady of the Moor. Chudleigh, Devon: Orchard Publications. ISBN 1-898964-04-1.
- Green, Christina (1979). Beatrice Chase. My Lady of the Moor (3rd ed.). Ideford, Devon: Ideford Publications.
- F. J. M. Laver (1989). "The Dartmoor Books of Beatrice Chase". Report & Transactions of the Devonshire Association. 121: 87–108.
- Milton, Patricia (2006). The Discovery of Dartmoor, a Wild and Wondrous Region. Chichester: Phillimore. pp. 190–195. ISBN 1-86077-401-6.
