= The Swan, Little Totham =

Grade II listed pub in Little Totham, Essex, England

Coordinates: 51°46′20″N 0°44′13″E

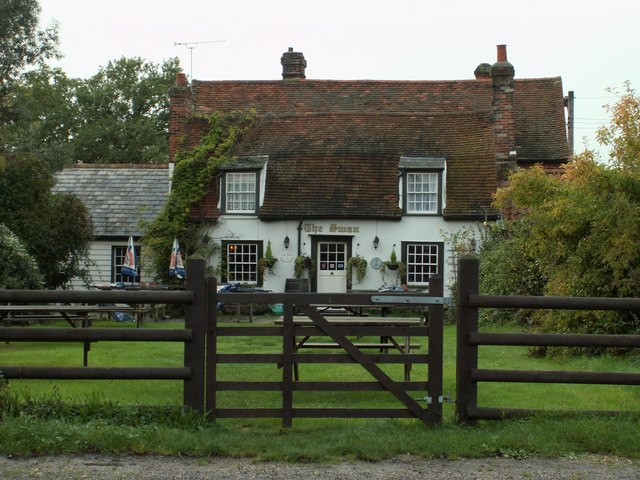
- The Swan in 2006
- Interactive map of the The Swan, Little Totham area

General information
- Location: School Road, Little Totham, United Kingdom
- Grid position: TL 88931 11726

Website
- theswanlittletotham.com

The Swan is a Grade II listed pub in Little Totham, Essex, England. The building has a whitewashed plaster exterior and a red tiled roof, with a large garden.

The building mainly originates from the 17th and 18th centuries, though there are 19th century additions to its rear.

The pub was CAMRA's National Pub of the Year for 2002 and 2005. In June 2013, the pub closed unexpectedly, prompting a group of 50 villagers to form Friends of the Swan, campaigning for it to stay as a pub. It was then sold to Phil Cornell who planned to reopen it in December. In 2025, The Daily Telegraph listed it as the best pub in Essex. It celebrates an annual Summer Beer Festival.
