= Old Spot Inn =

Pub in Dursley, Gloucestershire, England

Coordinates: 51.68098°N 2.35767°W

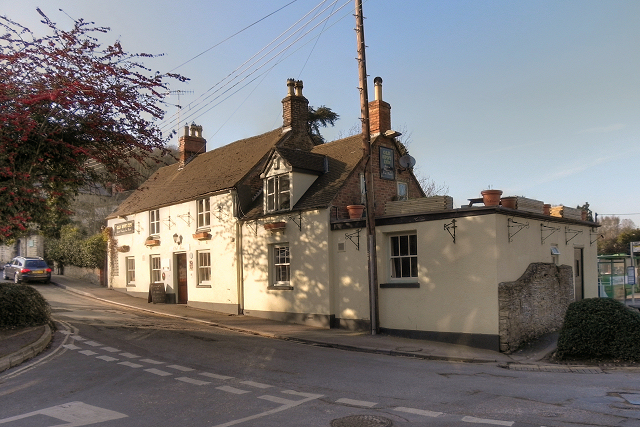
Old Spot Inn

The Old Spot Inn is a pub in Dursley, Gloucestershire, England.

It was CAMRA's National Pub of the Year for 2007.
