= Fat Cat Brewery =

Brewery in Norwich, England

- Interactive map of Fat Cat Brewery
- Location: Norwich, Norfolk, England
- Coordinates: 52.6434°N 1.3003°E
- Opened: 2005
- Owner: Colin Keatley
- Website: www.fatcatbrewery.co.uk

Active beers
Name	Type
Norwich Bitter	Bitter
Tom Cat	India pale ale
Wild Cat	Extra pale ale
Marmilade Cat	Strong bitter
Honey Ale	Honey beer

The Fat Cat Brewery is a brewery located at the Fat Cat Brewery Tap, Lawson Road, Norwich, in the English county of Norfolk. The brewery is owned by Colin Keatley, landlord of the Fat Cat public house, twice winner of the CAMRA National Pub of the Year.

== History ==
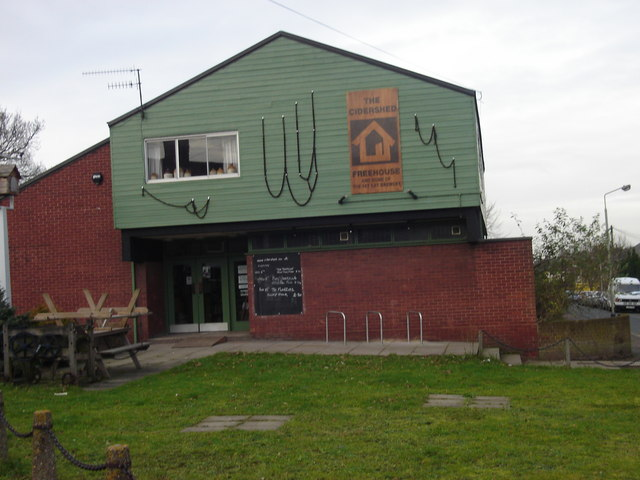
The brewery is based at the Fat Cat Brewery Tap

In 2004, Keatley acquired the 1970s built Wherry public house with the ultimate aim of creating a brewery on the premises. After renaming the pub The Shed and later the Cider Shed following a legal dispute. The brewery was opened in September 2005 by Roger Protz editor of the Good Beer Guide. Today 2011, the brewery supplies beer under the guidance of former Woodforde's brewer Ray Ashworth to its sister-pubs the Fat Cat and the Fat Cat and Canary, and also to other wholesale and retail outlets.
