= The Salutation Inn =

Pub in Gloucestershire, England

Coordinates: 51.68337°N 2.46396°W

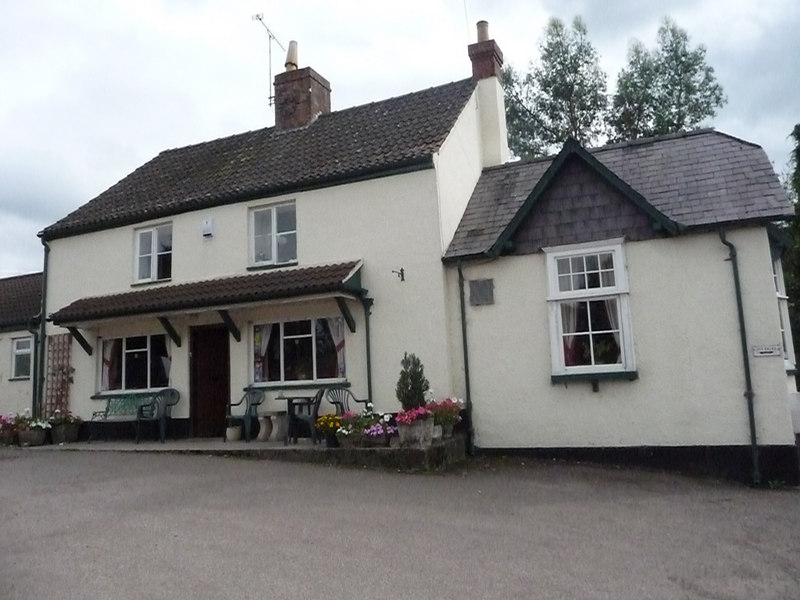
The Salutation Inn, Ham

The Salutation Inn is a pub in Ham, Berkeley, Gloucestershire, England.

It was CAMRA's National Pub of the Year for 2014.
