= Bricklayer's Arms, Putney =

Pub in Putney, London, England

Coordinates: 51°27′58″N 0°13′00″W

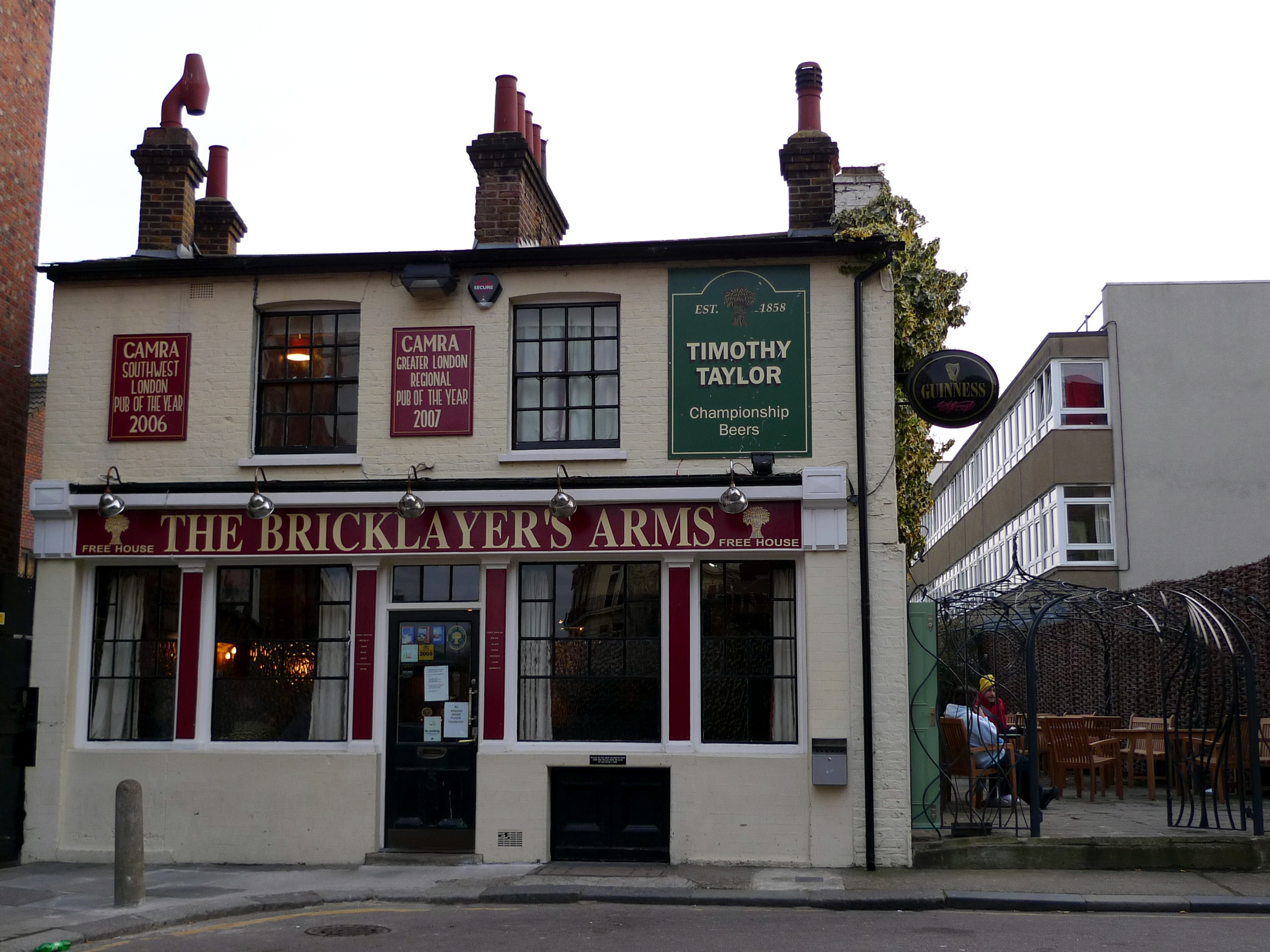
The Bricklayer's Arms

The Bricklayer's Arms, Waterman Street, is one of the oldest pubs in Putney, London. It has twice been CAMRA National Pub of the Year for the Greater London Region, in 2007 and 2009, and was "South West London Pub of the Year" in 2006, 2008 and 2010.

It was built in 1826, on the site of an old coaching house and blacksmith's forge, and was then known as the Waterman's Arms, as it was very close to the river Thames, and the men who worked on the boats formed the majority of its customers. At the end of the 19th century, it changed its name to the Bricklayer's Arms, as there was a huge amount of construction taking place in the surrounding area, due to the extension of the District line railway.

The landlady Becky Newman is a former actress, having appeared in Casualty and The House of Eliott. She took over the pub in 2005.

Before Newman took over, it had been an Inntrepreneur tenancy, and in 2000 was restyled as the Putney Brick, but soon closed, as the then owners intended to sell the site for redevelopment. In 2002, the pub was bought at auction by Newman's brother-in-law John and sister Helen. They reopened it for six months without great success, and it became their family home. After Helen's unexpected death in January 2005, money was needed to support his young family, so John and Newman reopened the pub on 27 March 2005, the day of The Boat Race, to immediate success.

In 2012, National Geographic rated the Bricklayer's Arms as a "compact Victorian gem", the third best pub in England.
