= Goosey Fair =

English town fair

Tavistock Goose Fair, known locally as the Goosey, or Goosie, Fair, is the annual fair in the stannary town of Tavistock in the west of Devon, England. It has been held on the second Wednesday of October since 1823 and it is one of only three historically established traditional fairs in the UK to carry the name, the other being the larger Nottingham Goose Fair, and the smaller Michaelmas Goose Fayre in Colyford, also in Devon.

The fair, originally focused on geese trading, has now transformed into a marketplace for vendors to sell toys, food, and offer amusement rides.

== History ==
Tavistock Goose Fair is one of the best known fairs in the West Country and has its ancient origins in the Michelmas fair that first came into being in the early 12th century. Adoption of the Gregorian calendar by Britain in 1752 necessitated a correction to the established dates of charter fairs, in this case moving Tavistock's fair from Michelmas day (29 September) to October 10. Whilst there appears to be little published evidence of the name ‘Goosey Fair’ prior to the first decade of the 20th century, it seems likely that the name was in use locally in the eighteenth century.

The goose name itself probably arose out of the old tradition of buying geese at the Michelmas market to be fattened ready for Christmas Day as goose was the fowl of choice for the dinner table long before the arrival of the turkey from North America. An alternative theory is that the name is a corruption of St Eustachius (Saint Eustace), the Patron Saint of the Parish church whose day fell on 20 September, close to Michelmas. The livestock market on Whitchurch Road continues the tradition with live geese and poultry being available for sale at public auction on the day itself, whilst some of the town's cafés and restaurants usually offer special goose themed menus.

Historically, the fair was mainly attended by the townsfolk, but the mix of visiting gypsy travellers, showmen, local miners and sailors from Devonport gave the fair a reputation for drunken behaviour and fighting. From the mid-1850s to the late 1960s, the Southern and GWR railway lines that once served Tavistock brought people in from outlying villages and the town's platforms were often awash with litter and drunken stragglers by the end of the day. Unlike today, in the early 20th century, people from other surrounding villages did not always travel to the fair partly because of its reputation but also from the fact that the journey had to be made on foot in the days before public road transport. The fair's rowdy atmosphere must have been in stark contrast to the more genteel charabanc picnic outings and paddle steamer excursions that were popular in the Tamar Valley area during the Edwardian era.

This fair went on hiatus in 1915–18, 1940–45 & 2020.

== "Tavvystock Goozey Vair" ==
Sheet music cover from 1912

The narrative folk song "Tavvystock Goozey Vair", first published in 1912 (words and music by C. John Trythall), is thought by some to be an older traditional song than "Widecombe Fair" and is still sung. There is a suggestion that the song was known in the years before publication and that Trythall was the first to document it. If true, it seems an oversight on the part of Rev. Sabine Baring-Gould to have omitted it from his folk song collections. Another theory holds that the song was composed by Trythall as a tribute to the people of Tavistock. Little is known of Trythall's identity, but the British Library Integrated Catalogue lists two other local songs by Trythall, both published in 1916, "The Dinky Farm nigh Burrator" and "Down 'pon ole Dartymoor". "Tavistock Gossey Fair" was recorded by the Yetties in 2001 (LP GRCD111 Grasmere Music Ltd). A version by Bob Cann and an unnamed singer recorded by Keith Summers is held by the British Library Sound Archive

== Goose Fair on film ==
Directed by Clive Gunnell and produced by Westward Television, an award-winning regional TV documentary film "To Tavistock Goosey Fair" was made in 1977 and was later published as a companion book.

The BFI has limited footage of the fair dating from 1975

Local TV news bulletins typically have annual coverage exploring different aspects of the fair.

== The Fair today ==
The fair traditionally provided a platform for livestock trading and other commercial activities, gradually evolving into a recurring social event for the community and attracting numerous visitors from surrounding areas. Local schools typically schedule an inset day to accommodate children attending the fair. Presently, the fair draws market traders from across the UK, with their stalls lining Abbey Bridge and stretching along Plymouth Road, accompanied by various smaller fairground rides. Visitors often seek out the latest popular gadgets or toy crazes showcased at the stalls. In addition to the customary aromas of various foods, representative fare at the fair might include local specialties.

During the fair week, the Wharf and Bedford car parks are utilized by the main travelling funfair, managed by the western section of the Showmen's Guild of Great Britain. The funfair, characterized by its brightly lit amusements, stalls, and lively rides, serves as the primary source of entertainment well into the night, continuing long after the market stalls have been dismantled.

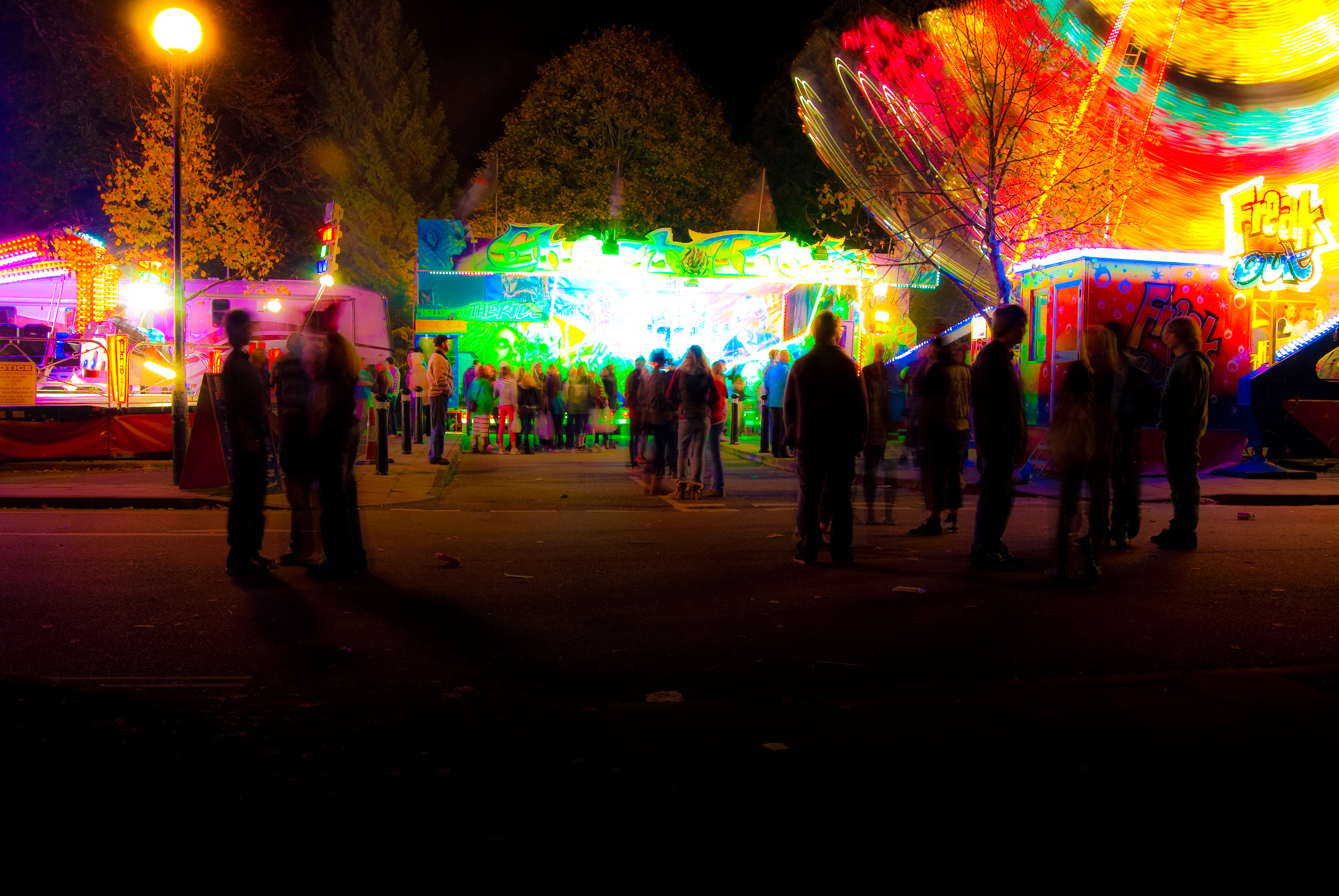
Large rides near the Wharf by night

There is a long-standing local sentiment expressed through the joke that "Goosie Fair is not as good as it used to be." However, this assertion is debatable, as the annual fair's enduring popularity consistently attracts large crowds, regardless of the autumn weather conditions experienced by the people of Tavistock.
