= Aldworth =

Village in Berkshire, England

Coordinates: 51°30′32″N 1°12′04″W

- Village and civil parish
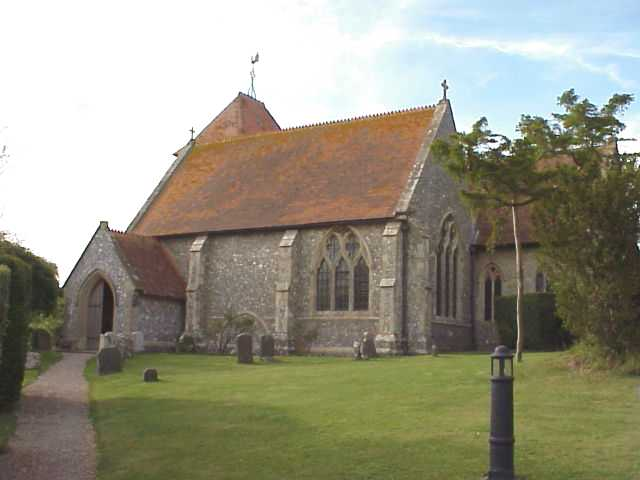
- St Mary's Church, Aldworth

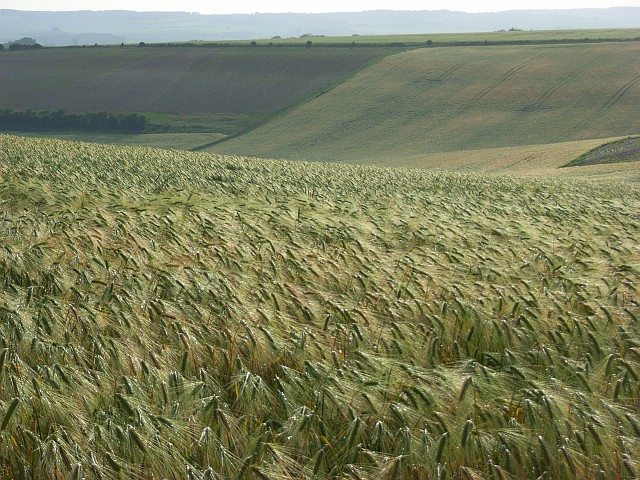
- Rolling fields of barley and other crops in Aldworth with patched woodland.

- Location within Berkshire
- Area: 9.06 km^{2} (3.50 sq mi)
- Population: 296 (2011 census)
  - Density: 33/km^{2} (85/sq mi)
- OS grid reference: SU5579
- Civil parish: Aldworth
- Unitary authority: West Berkshire
- Ceremonial county: Berkshire
- Region: South East
- Country: England
- Sovereign state: United Kingdom
- Post town: Reading
- Postcode district: RG8
- Dialling code: 01635
- Police: Thames Valley
- Fire: Royal Berkshire
- Ambulance: South Central
- UK Parliament: Newbury
- Website: Aldworth Village Community Website

Aldworth is a village and mainly farmland civil parish in the English county of Berkshire, near the boundary with Oxfordshire.

== Orthography and slight change of name ==
Aldworth was recorded in the Domesday Book of 1086 by scribes whose orthography was heavily geared towards French, lacking k and w, regulated forms for sounds ð and θ and ending many hard consonant words with e, as Elleorde, hinting at El(d)ward, the Old English for Old Ward i.e. Old farmed out (let) land. Scribes in the 12th century rendered it at least once as Aldewurda.

== Geography ==
Aldworth is in a rural area between Reading, Newbury and Streatley. It includes the hamlets of Westridge Green and Hungerford Green. (Note: at grid reference SU564797) It lies on the high ground of the Berkshire Downs, just off the B4009 road between Newbury and Streatley. The Ridgeway, an 87 miles (140 km) pre-Roman footpath crosses the north of the parish.

== History ==
King Alfred's defeat of the Danes at the Battle of Ashdown in January 871, is said by some to have occurred near The Ridgeway and Lowbury Hill.

In medieval times there was a fortified manor house or castle; La Beche Castle once stood on the site of what is now Beche Farm in the parish. This was the main residence of the De La Beche family, after whom it was named. This well-known family of medieval knights had held high positions at court since at least 1260. The De La Beche family remained powerful landowners and knights in the 14th century. Many were retainers to the king, warders to the Tower of London, and sheriffs of Oxfordshire and Berkshire. The family was influential in the reigns of Edward II and Edward III, and embroiled in the royal intrigue of the time. Sir Phillip was imprisoned in Scarborough Castle from 1322 to 1327, but later pardoned by Edward III. His father, also Sir Phillip, had been imprisoned and later pardoned under Edward II.

== Amenities ==
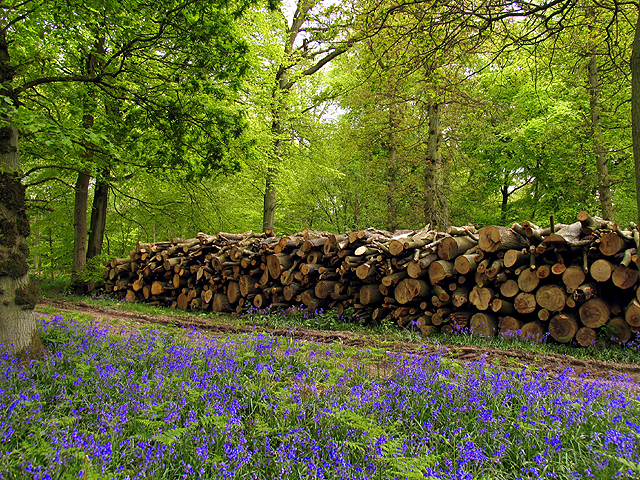
Long Copse in the south of the parish, with bluebells.

A small area in the south of the village bears woodland centuries old that is still coppiced and carpeted with bluebells. It is open to the public subject to informal permission. The Bell Inn is a 15th-century inn that has twice won a National Pub of the Year award. Another pub, The Four Points, stands at a crossroads south of the village centre.

== Governance ==
Aldworth is a civil parish with an elected parish council. It belongs to the West Berkshire unitary authority and the parliamentary constituency of Newbury.

== Parish church ==
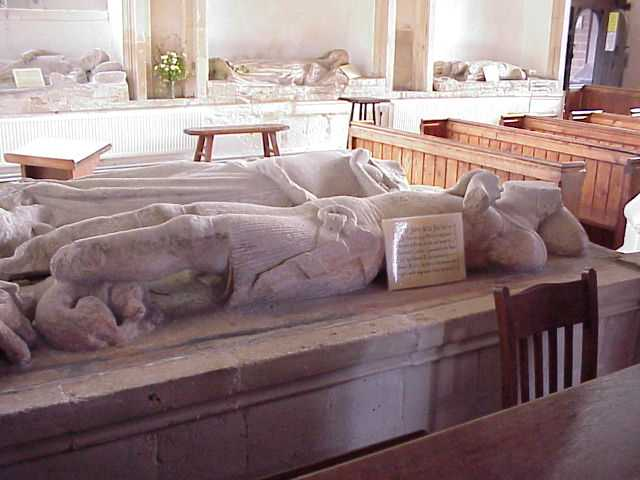
The Aldworth giants are on all sides of the pews in St Mary's Church, and are effigies to members of the same family.

The Church of England parish church of Saint Mary is a Grade I listed building, parts of which date back to the 12th century.

The church contains numerous effigies to the De La Beche family. The collection holds the largest number of medieval memorials to a single family in any parish church. The figures are supposed to be life-size representations, but some of the knights are over seven feet tall, which has led to them being known as the Aldworth Giants. They were long thought to have been erected in the 1340s by the influential Sir Nicholas De La Beche (sometimes erroneously called Lord De La Beche), but historians now prefer to date them variously in the Middle Ages. A large number of the effigies were damaged by Parliamentarian iconoclasts during the English Civil War of the 17th century. Many of the knights are missing the lower part of their legs, noses and arms, presumably because these were easy parts to break off. Parliamentarians may have seen the giants as a symbol of royalty, although many churches were ransacked in the same period.

In the churchyard to the east of the church is the Aldworth Yew, an ancient yew tree. The yew was a popular subject for postcards in the 19th century. The trunk diameter was measured at 9 yards (8.2 m) in 1644, but in 1787 it was reported to be in decline. In 1909, its girth was described as requiring "seven men to span it", and little remained other than the broken trunk and a few branches, most broken and dead. By the late 20th century, the trunk was mostly hollow, and it broke during the Gale of January 1976, though some roots survived, enabling the tree to regrow with fresh growth. In 2016, the yew was certified to be over 1,000 years old.

The poet, Laurence Binyon, moved to Westridge Green on his retirement in 1933. After his death in 1943, his ashes were scattered in the churchyard, where there is a slate memorial plaque to him. The parents of Emily Tennyson, Lady Tennyson née Sellwood, the wife of Alfred, Lord Tennyson, are also buried there. Marianne Faithfull, the noted singer songwriter and actress is also buried in the churchyard. Her mother Eva von Sacher Masoch lived in the village from the late sixties until her death and Marianne lived with her there for a time in the early seventies.

== Demography ==
2011 Published Statistics: Population, home ownership and extracts from Physical Environment, surveyed in 2005
Output area	Homes owned outright	Owned with a loan	Socially rented	Privately rented	Other	km^{2} roads	km^{2} water	km^{2} domestic gardens	Usual residents	km^{2}
Civil parish	38	40	15	18	4	0.05	0.001	0.1	296	9.06
