= Sandford Park Alehouse =

Pub in Cheltenham, England

Coordinates: 51°53′49″N 2°04′12″W

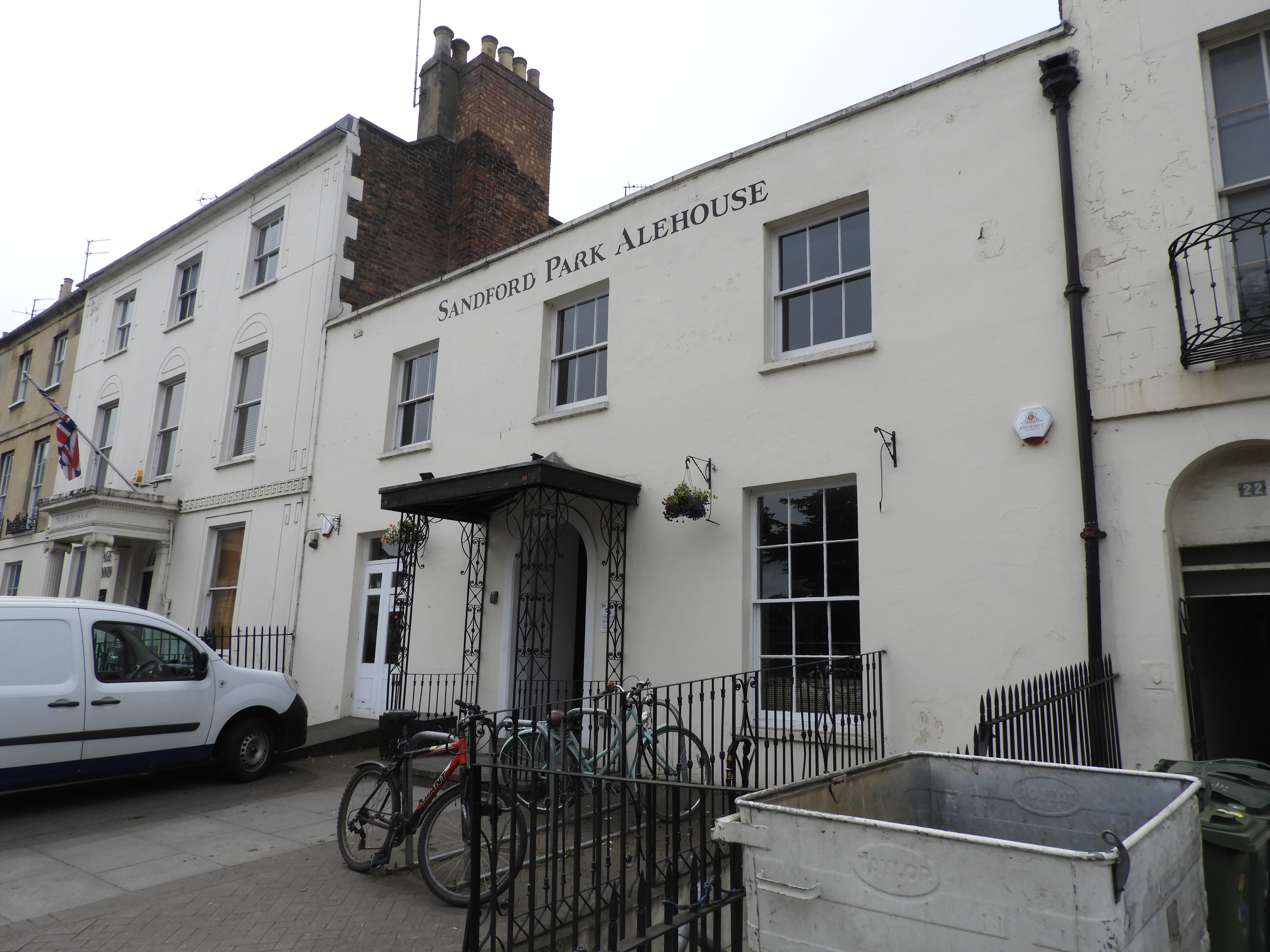
Sandford Park Alehouse

Sandford Park Alehouse is a pub at 20 High Street, Cheltenham, Gloucestershire, England, it opened in 2010.

It was CAMRA's National Pub of the Year for 2015.

It is in a grade II listed building.
