= National Inventory of Historic Pub Interiors =

Register of UK public houses

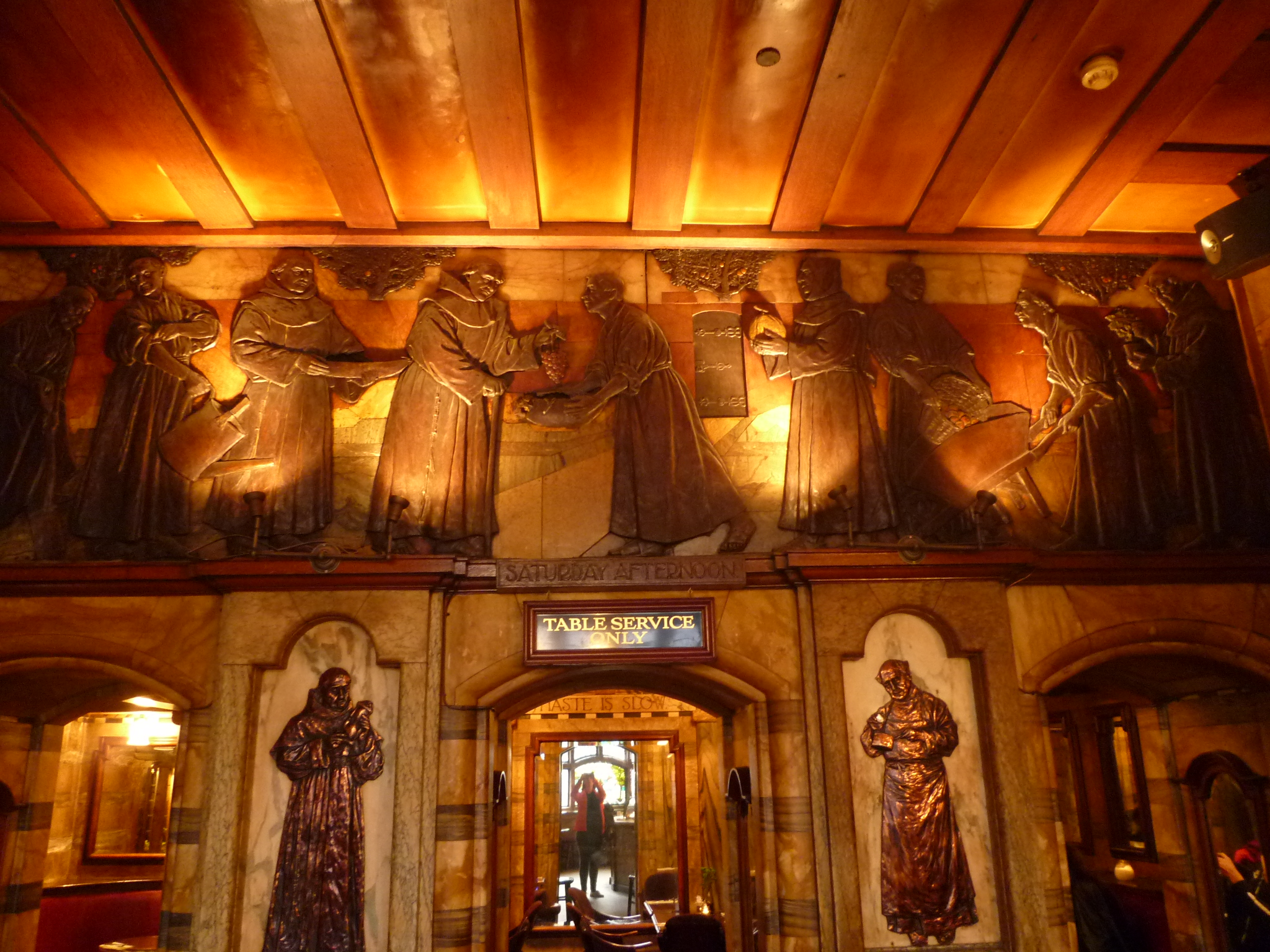
Interior of The Blackfriar in London, a Grade II* listed public house

The National Inventory of Historic Pub Interiors was a register of public houses in the United Kingdom whose interiors were considered to be of significant historic interest, having remained largely unchanged for at least 30 years, and often since the Second World War. It is widely used as a reference point for identifying historically intact pub interiors in the UK.

The Inventory was created and maintained by the Campaign for Real Ale (CAMRA) as part of its work to protect historic pub interiors. CAMRA is an independent, voluntary consumer organisation in the United Kingdom whose aims include promoting real ale, cider and perry, and supporting pubs and clubs in local communities. It is now the largest single-issue consumer group in the UK. Within CAMRA, the Pub Heritage Group identifies, records and seeks to protect pub interiors of historic or architectural importance, including encouraging statutory listing where appropriate. Assessment focuses on the survival of original layout, fittings, fixtures and decorative schemes. The group maintained the National Inventory (NI), the Regional Inventory (RI), and a list of pubs with interiors of some regional interest. The NI contained 289 pubs in June 2009.

In 2023 the system was revised into a single register of "real heritage pubs", defined as pubs with significant interior features that have remained unaltered for at least 50 years. Each entry is graded from one to three stars, with three indicating "outstanding historic importance", two "very special historic interest", and one "special historic interest". These broadly correspond to the former categories, although many pubs were re-evaluated and regraded. As of October 2026, the register contained 303 three‑star pubs, 270 two‑star pubs and 740 one‑star pubs. Entries are published by CAMRA and updated periodically. The grading applies only to interiors; exteriors may be protected separately through statutory or local listing. Inclusion in the register is independent of statutory listing, although many pubs appear on both.

CAMRA has established influence at national level, including with English Heritage, and has been designated by the Secretary of State for Trade and Industry as a "super-complainant" to the Office of Fair Trading. It also presents the Pub Design Awards, held in association with English Heritage and The Victorian Society, covering categories such as new-build, refurbishment and conversion.
