= Crown & Thistle, Gravesend =

Closed pub in Gravesend, Kent, England

Coordinates: 51.44358°N 0.37439°E

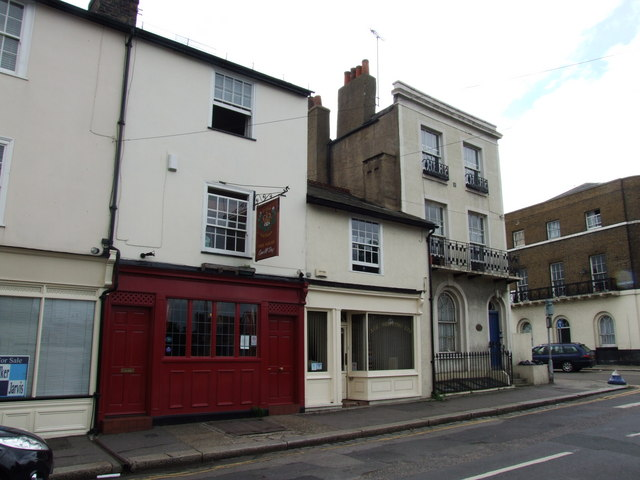
The Crown and Thistle, Gravesend

The Crown & Thistle was a pub at 44 The Terrace, Gravesend, Kent, England. It is Grade II listed.

It opened in 1849.

It was CAMRA's National Pub of the Year for 2003.

The pub has been closed since November 2015.
