= Bridge End Inn =

Pub in Ruabon, Wales

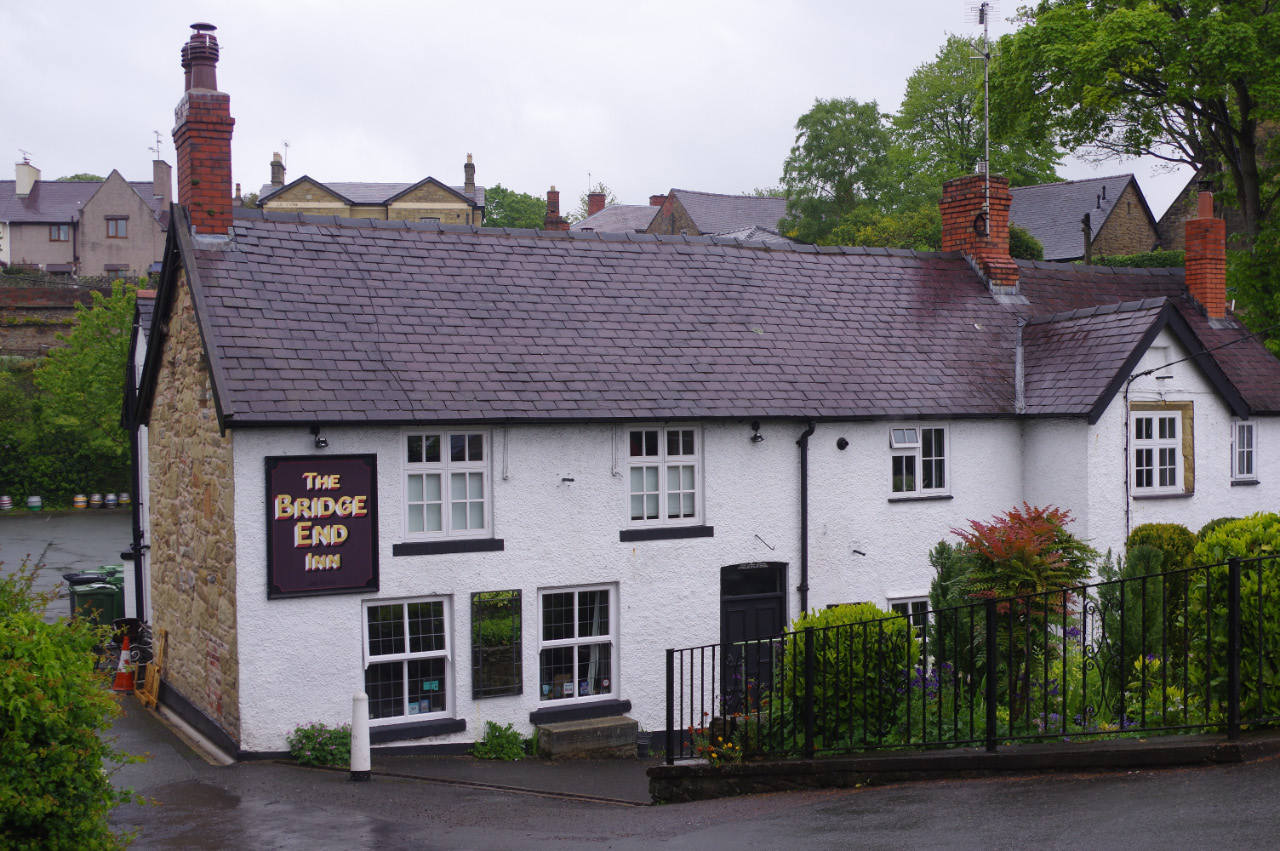
- The front of the pub from Bridge Street
- Interactive map of the Bridge End Inn area

General information
- Type: Public house Former coaching inn
- Location: Ruabon, Wrexham, Wales
- Coordinates: 52.98666°N 3.04091°W
- Owner: McGivern family (since 2008)

Website
- bridgeendruabon.com

The Bridge End Inn is a pub in Ruabon, Wales. Located in a former coaching inn, since 2008 it has been operated by the McGivern family and has its own microbrewery. It has received various local and national awards.

== History ==
The Bridge End Inn was previously known as the Bricklayers Arms between the 1850s and 1880s, and is a former coaching inn. In March 2009, the Bridge End Inn was opened after being closed for six months. It incorporates the McGivern microbrewery, who are the family who has operated the pub since 2008.

It is located not far from Ruabon railway station, has three low-ceiling rooms and a covered outdoor drinking area. The beer garden hosts events such as music nights and celebration parties. The pub serves eight ales, including a brew from the on-site brewery when it is operating, along with a selection of beers that are generally sourced within 60 miles of the pub.

== Awards ==
In 2011, the pub won, CAMRA's National Pub of the Year for 2011, Welsh Regional Pub of the Year and the Chester & South Clwyd CAMRA Welsh Pub of the Year.

In 2012, it won National CAMRA Pub of the Year Runners-Up, the first Welsh and youngest pub to do so, as well as Welsh Regional Pub of the Year and Chester & South Clwyd CAMRA Welsh Pub of the Year.

In 2014, 2015, 2017, and 2018, it won Chester & South Clwyd CAMRA Welsh Pub of the Year. In 2018, it was also stated to be the best in Wales in the Good Beer Guide.

In 2025, it won CAMRA's Pub of the Year for the Dee Valley area and the wider North Wales area.

== See also ==
- Wynnstay Arms Hotel, Ruabon – nearby pub and hotel in Ruabon, Wales
