= Little Totham =

Village in Essex, England

Coordinates: 51.774°N 0.738°E

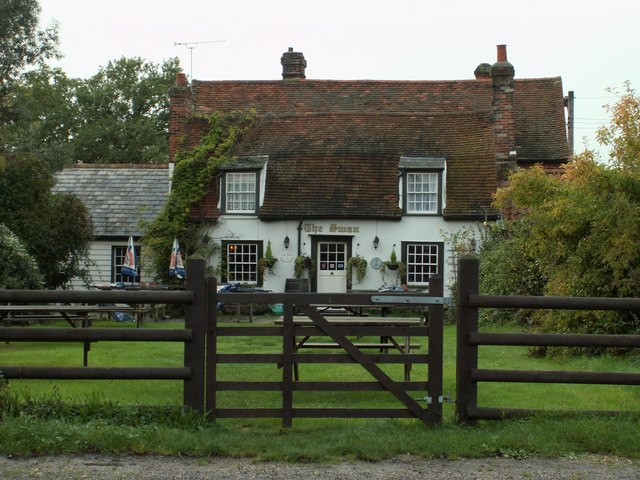
- The Swan

- Location within Essex
- Population: 424 (Parish, 2021)
- OS grid reference: TL889118
- District: Maldon
- Shire county: Essex
- Region: East
- Country: England
- Sovereign state: United Kingdom
- Post town: Maldon
- Postcode district: CM9
- Dialling code: 01621
- Police: Essex
- Fire: Essex
- Ambulance: East of England
- UK Parliament: Witham

Little Totham is a village in the Maldon District of Essex, England. The parish extends from the extensive common and heath-land of Tiptree down to the River Blackwater. The village lies about 6 miles 10 km) from Maldon and 5 miles (8 km) from Tiptree and lies on the back road between Goldhanger and the Maldon to Colchester road. At the 2021 census the parish had a population of 424.

Most of the population live on the edge of the parish adjoining Tolleshunt Major and centred on the main road running through the village past The Swan public house and children's play area. The rest of the parish is agricultural.

== History ==
The halls of Little Totham and Rook Hall have their origins in the 12th century, and the architecture of this period is seen in the North and South doorways of the parish church of All Saints, which lies adjacent to Little Totham Hall (Farm) in the centre of the parish. The parish church has an active community which provides community support in the form of pastoral visits, caring and community activities. This 12th-century church houses one of the oldest recorded stone doorways in the country (c. AD 1085), and there is a comprehensive history document within the church.

The present main road through the village was originally a track used by smugglers bringing liqueur, silks and other cloths from the River Blackwater to the plains where travellers would exchange them for money. In Little Totham, on the edge of the River Blackwater and in the fields near Osea Island there is evidence of man dwelling there from as far back as the Bronze Age 6,000 years ago. There is evidence of the smelting of ores using the wood from the extensive forests which covered the area.

The main farms developed in the area in the 11th century, and life revolved around these until the development of the dwellings along the smugglers' route in the late 16th century. Notably among these is the White Horse (now the White House), which was a pub and boarding house until the beginning of the 20th century. There are extensive patterns of footpaths across the area which lead to the farms and were developed by farm workers walking to and from work. There has always been a history of itinerant workers both on the farms and in the smuggling trade and these have over the years rested, albeit temporarily, on the Totham plains.

'The Plains' which form some of the largest areas of common land in the country are within the village boundary and there are many pleasant walks across them.

In the mid- to late 19th and early 20th centuries more substantial farm workers' cottages were built around the "main" road and the village grew. In the late 19th century three more ale houses sprang up to deal with the thirst of these farm workers. The 17th-century residential property near the extensive village pond became The Swan Ale House and more latterly a Public House. Further along the road the White Hart (now demolished) was for a period an ale house and off-licence. Along Plains Road, The Eagle (now a private house) was an ale house mainly serving itinerant travellers who came seasonally to work on the land. It was at this time that the Peculiar People's Chapel was built on the common. This is still an active Evangelical Church.

The present village is a mixture of these old houses and more modern development, and the community is a mixture of people. People who work from home, commute to Maldon, Witham, Chelmsford, Colchester and London, are retired or craftsmen. The farms are still working mainly arable crops, present cereals and rape. There are hen and turkey farms, pigs and sheep. There has been some diversification where gravel has been extracted and the land laid down to lakes for nature trails and fishing.

== Car show and Fête ==
Every year, hosted upon the Village Green, in Little Totham, is the Classic Car Show, and a village fête. The event is organised by David Oram and his family, and the team from All Saints’ Church, all working with the parish council.
