= Frances Griffith =

British archaeologist

Frances Griffith FSA
- Occupation: Archaeologist

Academic work
- Discipline: Archaeology
- Sub-discipline: Aerial archaeology
- Institutions: Devon County Council; Devon Archaeological Society; Royal Archaeological Institute

Frances Griffith FSA is a British archaeologist specialising in aerial archaeology. She worked as Devon County Archaeologist until her retirement in 2011. She was elected a Fellow of the Society of Antiquaries of London in 1997.

From 1983, while working in Devon, Griffith undertook a programme of aerial reconnaissance across the county mapping archaeological sites. Described by Devon historian Simon Timms as Griffith's "seminal work", the aerial survey led to greater understanding of Devon's archaeological sites, including the prehistoric sites in the county beyond Dartmoor. Among the sites identified by Griffith through aerial archaeology was a Roman military site on St Andrew's Hill in Cullompton. She has been a vice-president of the Royal Archaeological Institute and the Devon Archaeological Society.
