= The Baum, Rochdale =

Pub in Greater Manchester, England

The Baum
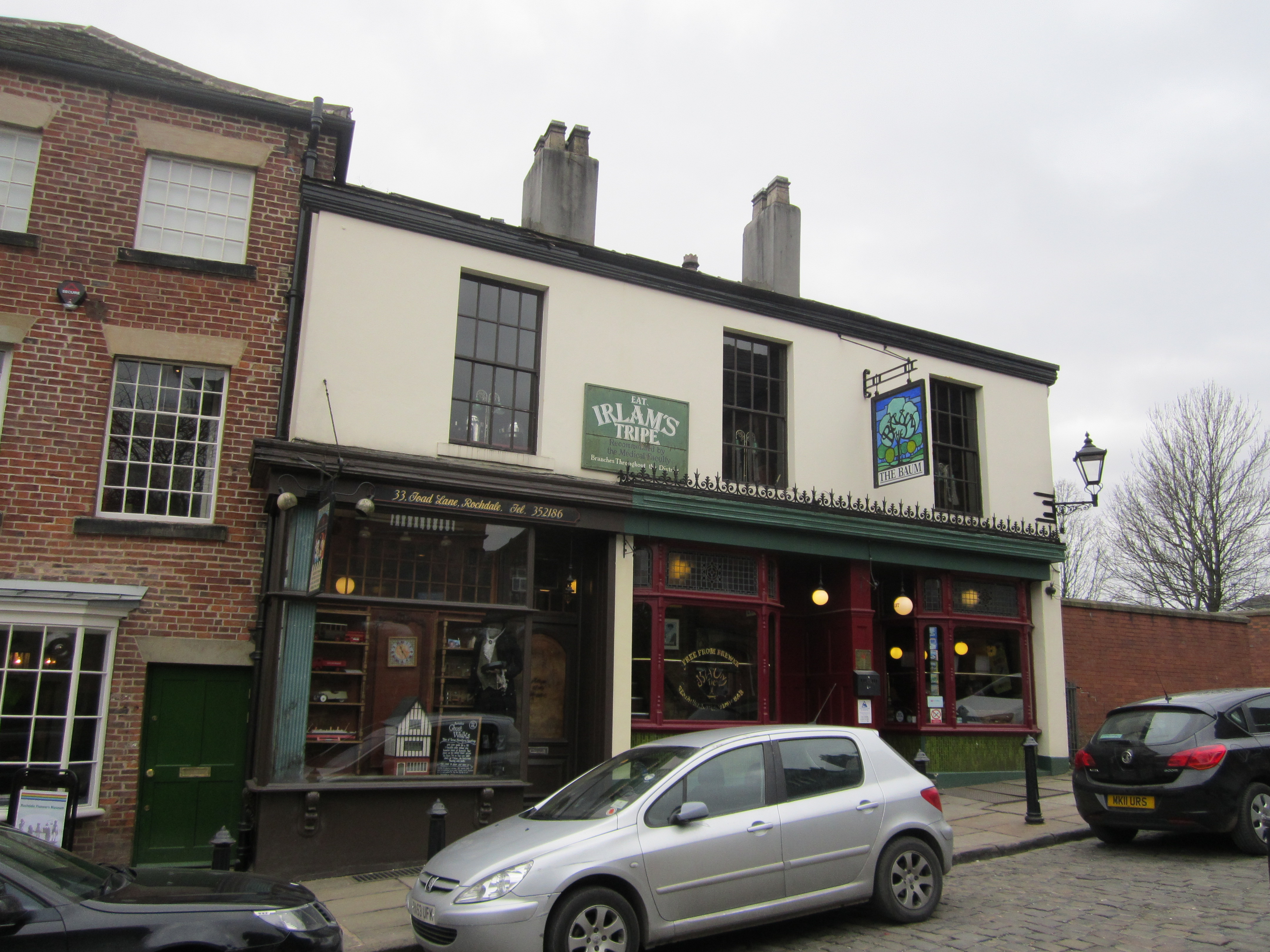
- The pub in 2013

General information
- Type: Public house; originally a shop
- Location: 33–37 Toad Lane, Rochdale, Greater Manchester, England
- Coordinates: 53.6188°N 2.1594°W
- Owner: Rochdale Borough Council

Website
- thebaum.co.uk

The Baum is a public house on Toad Lane in Rochdale, a town in Greater Manchester, England. Formerly a hardware store, it was converted into a pub in the early 1980s and lies within the Toad Lane conservation area. The pub was CAMRA's National Pub of the Year in 2012 and is operated by Tree & Toad, with the freehold owned by Rochdale Borough Council.

== History ==
The building was formerly a hardware store and converted to a pub in the early 1980s. In 1977 the site was included in the newly established Toad Lane conservation area. The pub stands a short distance from the Grade I‑listed Church of St Mary in the Baum and adjacent to the Grade II‑listed Rochdale Pioneers Museum. The name "Baum" (Rochdale dialect for balm) refers to the wildflowers that once grew in the meadows around the church. These were thought to be either lemon balm or white mint.

The Baum was CAMRA's National Pub of the Year for 2012. As of February 2026, it is operated by Tree & Toad and the freehold is owned by Rochdale Borough Council.

== Architecture ==
The two-storey building is constructed in brick with a rendered exterior and a three‑bay front. The upper floor has three 16‑pane sash windows set beneath a simple eaves line, and two chimneys rise from the roof. At street level the building retains two canted shopfronts with bay windows and green glazed tiling, separated by a pair of doorways. A third shopfront to the left, formerly No. 33, has a plate‑glass frontage and its own entrance.

Inside, the pub is arranged as a series of intimate spaces with bare timber floors and a traditional interior. A conservatory occupies the rear of the building, opening onto a walled beer garden.
