= Widecombe in the Moor =

Village in Devon, England

Coordinates: 50.57593°N 3.81191°W

Widecombe-in-the-Moor
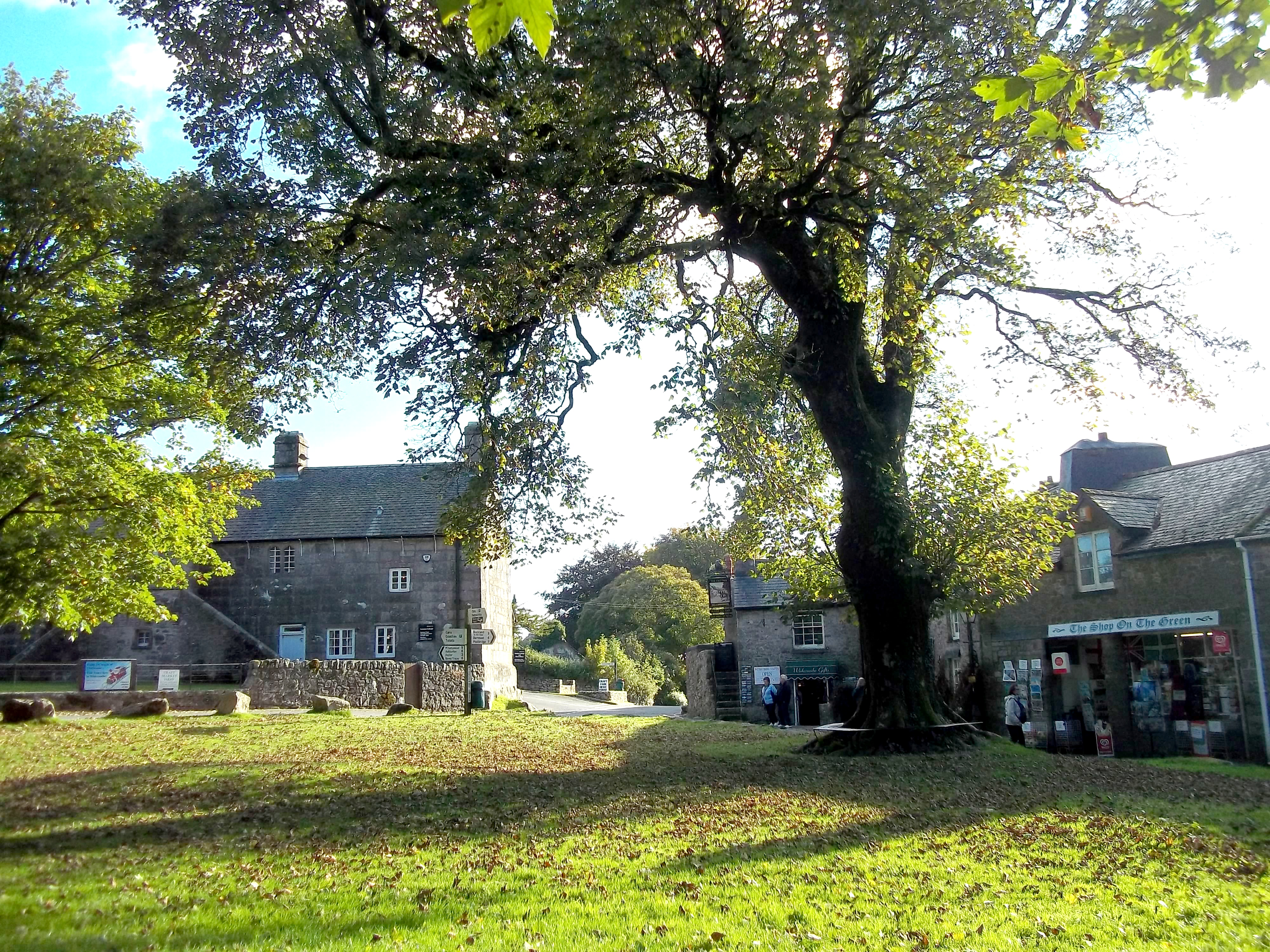
- Village green

- Location within Devon
- OS grid reference: SX718767
- Civil parish: Widecombe in the Moor
- District: Teignbridge
- Shire county: Devon
- Region: South West
- Country: England
- Sovereign state: United Kingdom
- Post town: NEWTON ABBOT
- Postcode district: TQ13
- Dialling code: 01364
- Police: Devon and Cornwall
- Fire: Devon and Somerset
- Ambulance: South Western
- UK Parliament: Central Devon
- Website: The Widecombe-in-the-Moor Website

Widecombe-in-the-Moor (/ˌwɪdɪkəm ... ˈmʊər/) is a village and large civil parish in Dartmoor National Park in Devon, England. Its church is known as the Cathedral of the Moors on account of its tall tower and its size, relative to the small population it serves. It is a favourite tourist centre, partly for its scenic character and partly for its connection to the popular song "Widecombe Fair".

== History ==
The name is thought to derive from 'Withy-combe' which means Willow Valley. According to Widecombe's official website, there are 196 households in the village, although its large and sprawling parish stretches for many miles and encompasses dozens of isolated cottages and moorland farms. The parish is surrounded, clockwise from the north, by the parishes of Manaton, Ilsington, Ashburton, Buckland-in-the-Moor, Holne and Dartmoor Forest.

Tourism is a major source of income for Widecombe today, and within a small area of the village there are several gift shops, one cafe and two pubs (the Old Inn and the Rugglestone Inn).

The village is known for Widecombe Fair, held annually and celebrated by a folksong of the same name, featuring "Old Uncle Tom Cobley and All". Its words were first published in 1880, and the characters from the song are featured in many of the souvenirs on sale in the local shops. Also popular are the traditional Toby Jugs; a type of mug, with a handle, shaped as a three-dimensional caricature of a person's head, sometimes fictional, sometimes a celebrity.

== North Hall ==
North Hall Manor was a medieval Manor House, likely built in the 13th century, that served as a central hub for the village. Archaeological findings suggest the site was historically significant, featuring a large moat roughly 10 metres wide and 4 metres deep. The earliest known lords of the manor of Widecombe (specifically North Hall) were the family of Ralph (or FitzRalph) who are believed to have held the manor from circa 1216, residing at North Hall, just north of the church.

== The church ==
The church of St Pancras is known as the "Cathedral of the Moors" in recognition of its 120-foot tower and relatively large capacity for such a small village. Originally built in the fourteenth century, in the Perpendicular style (late Gothic), using locally quarried granite, it was enlarged over the following two centuries, partly on the proceeds of the local tin mining trade. Inside, the ceiling is decorated with a large number of decorative roof bosses, including the tinner’s emblem of a circle of three hares (known locally as the Tinners' Rabbits).

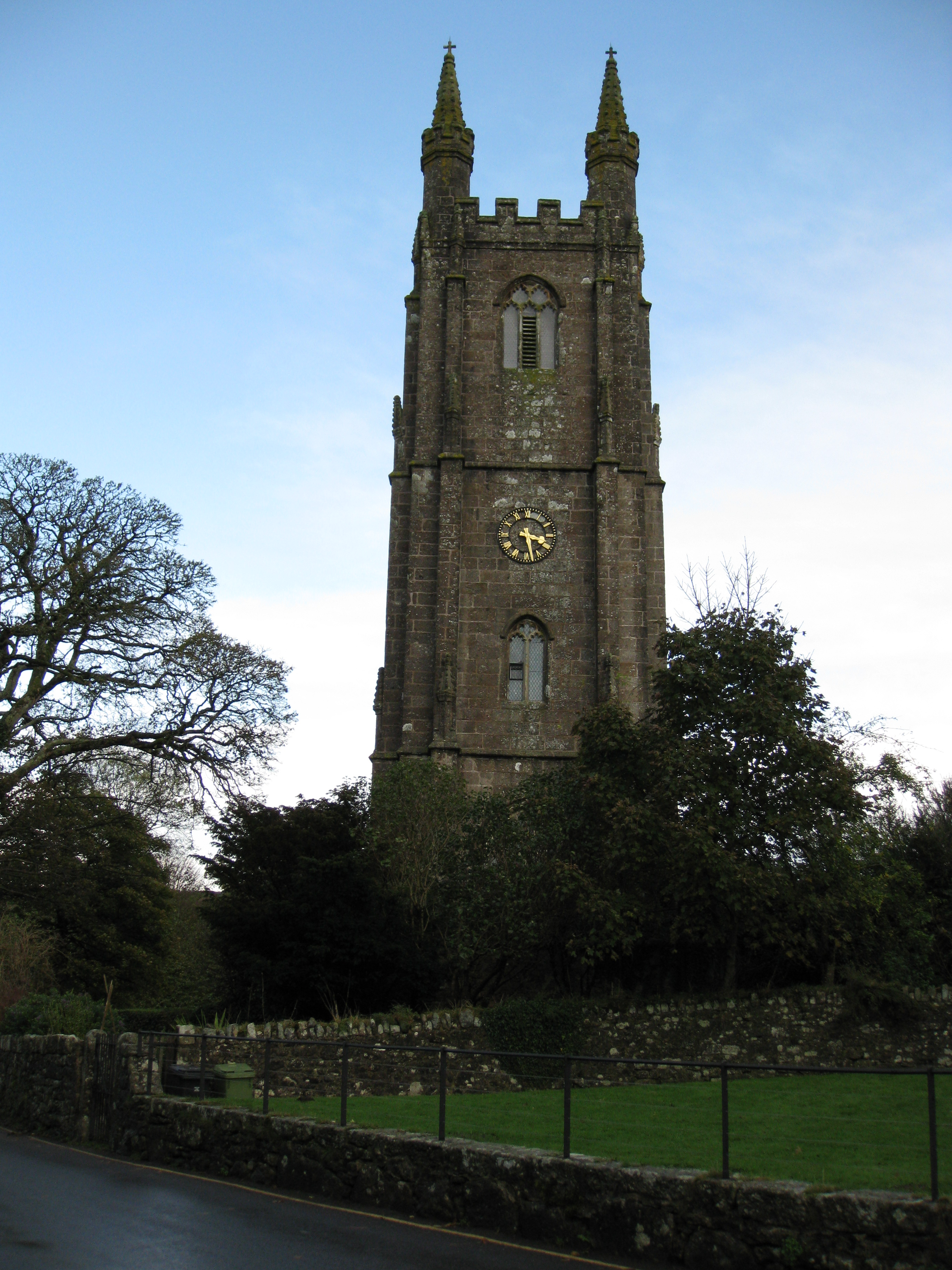
St Pancras Church, Widecombe-in-the-Moor

It was badly damaged in the Great Thunderstorm of 1638, apparently struck by ball lightning during an afternoon service. The building was packed with about 300 people sheltering from the storm, four of whom were killed and around 60 injured. Local legend relates that the disaster was caused by a visit from the Devil.

In Widecombe churchyard is the grave of novelist Beatrice Chase who lived for much of her life in a cottage close to the village.

== Education ==
The Karuna Institute, a collaboration partner of Middlesex University is located here.

Widecombe Primary School is a primary school that educates around 70 pupils.

== Other features ==
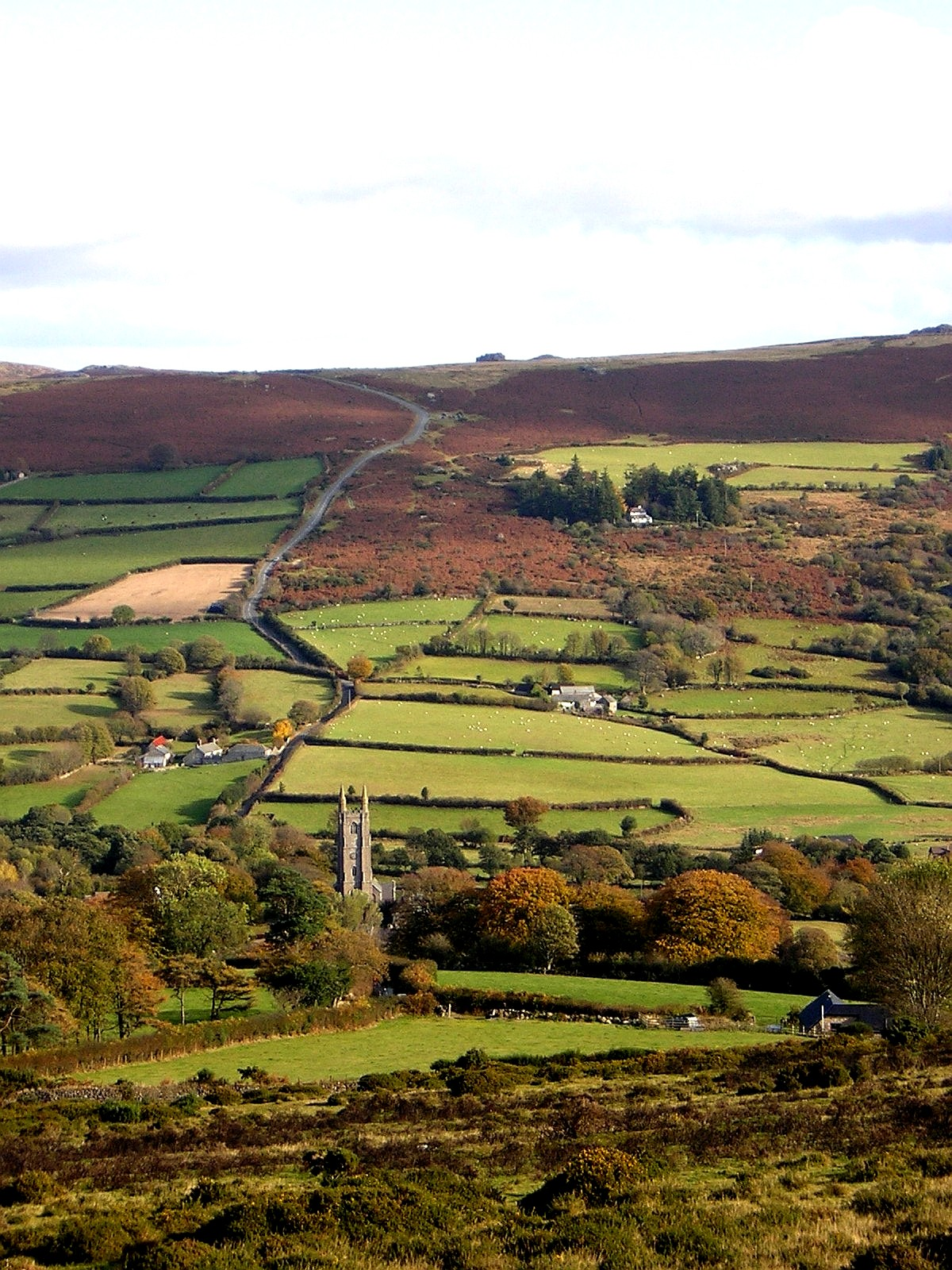
Widecombe Valley

Next to the church stands the Church House, built in 1537. It is thought to have originally been built as a brewery for the production of church ales, became adapted as an almshouse, and later became the village school. Today, it is used as a meeting place for local people. Sexton's Cottage forms the western end of the building and is now a National Trust shop and Dartmoor National Park information point. It is now managed by the National Trust. Standing in front of the building is a 15-inch naval shell, which was donated to the village after the First World War to thank the villagers for supplying troops with sphagnum moss. This grows in abundance in the damp Dartmoor conditions, and is said to have healing properties. It was used as an emergency field dressing for injured troops.

The size of the parish meant that, for centuries, families were obliged to walk for miles to attend the church every Sunday. The task was even more challenging when it came to burying their dead, whose coffins had to be carried over rough ground and both up and down exceptionally steep hills. Halfway up Dartmeet Hill, for example, lies the Coffin Stone, close to the road, where the body would be placed to allow the bearers to take a rest. The rock is split in two, along its length. Local legend has it that the body of a particularly wicked man was laid there. God took exception to this, and struck the stone with a thunderbolt, destroying the coffin and splitting the stone in two.

The deserted medieval village of Hutholes and the abandoned farmstead Dinna Clerks (also spelt Dinah Clark's) are nearby. The Rippon Tor Rifle Range lies within five miles of the village.

== In popular culture ==
In the reality show Celebrity Ghost Stories, American actor Daniel Stern claimed to have had an unsettling, and possibly supernatural, experience while on a brief visit to the village during his honeymoon in 1980. He also recounted that people in the region considered Widecombe to be haunted, and that the Great Thunderstorm of 1638 was blamed. The official Widecombe-in-the-Moor website responded to the claims and dismissed the alleged hauntings as a legend borne of superstitions.

In 2010, Widecombe-in-the-Moor was one of the filming locations for the Steven Spielberg film War Horse.
