= Pub Design Awards =

Annual awards for UK pubs

Pub Design Awards (PDA)
- Description: Recognition for exceptional pub architecture and conservation in the UK
- Country: United Kingdom
- Presented by: CAMRA (Campaign for Real Ale)

The Pub Design Awards (PDA) are an annual awards, established in 1983 and hosted by CAMRA in association with English Heritage and the Victorian Society, that are given to exceptional pubs in the UK that have been newly built/converted or have recently undergone building/conservation work.

== Categories ==
The awards cover 4 Categories:

1. New Build (For newly constructed pubs)
2. Conversion of existing buildings to pub use (For use of a building that had not previously been a pub)
3. Refurbishment of existing public houses (For recently refurbished pubs. The final interior must suit the era of the building and enhance the 'feel' of the pub)
4. The English Heritage Award for conservation (For pubs that have retained much of their original design and/or decor and have recently had conservation work to improve the overall condition of the interior.)

There is also a fifth award which is given independently of the above categories and cannot be entered directly; the Joe Goodwin Conservation Award, sometimes known as Joe Goodwin Award for best 'Street-Corner Local'. This is chosen from all entries, not just winners of other categories.

Any pub can only enter one category, entries may be from anywhere in the British Isles. Anyone can enter a pub for the awards.

== Entry ==
Photographs and a typed description (Max. 2 A4 sheets) of the interior and exterior and what work was completed are required for entry, as are drawings of the interior plan and location map of the pub.

To qualify, the work must have been finished between 1 January and 31 December of the year before, e.g. For 2007, the work on the pub must have been completed sometime in 2006.

== Judging ==
Judging takes place initially by shortlisting, after which the selection will be visited, the panel comprises members of the CAMRA Pubs Group along with conservation experts and architects outside CAMRA.

Not every award is given every year (depending on the entries), but there are often mentions for highly commended pubs, and some years there are joint winners when there are a number of exceptional pubs in particular categories.

The winners receive a plaque which can be displayed publicly in the pub, permanently.

== Winners ==
Where the entry reads None Awarded, this means no award was given in that category for that year, even though there may be 'Highly Commended' pubs in that category(which are not listed here). None listed, this means there was no information about that particular award. Sources: CAMRA website - PDA winners list; What's Brewing (Newspaper of CAMRA), Issue: April 2007, Article: Better pubs by design..

	Award				
Year	New Build	Conversion	Refurbishment	Conservation	Joe Goodwin Award
2008	Zero Degrees, Reading, Berkshire	Unknown	Joint Winners: Princess Louise, High Holborn, London; Castle Inn, Bradford on Avon, Wilts	Unknown	Unknown
2007	The Black Horse Inn, Walcote, Leicestershire	The Tobie Norris, Stamford, Lincolnshire	The Weaver Hotel, Runcorn, Cheshire	The Weaver Hotel	None Awarded
2006	None Awarded	The Works, Sowerby Bridge, W. Yorkshire	Prince of Wales, Herne Bay, Kent	Three Pigeons, Halifax, W. Yorkshire	Joint: Prince of Wales, Herne Bay, Kent; Three Pigeons, Halifax, W. Yorkshire
2004/2005	Zero Degrees, Bristol	The Yorkshire Terrier, York	The Racecourse, Lower Kersal, Salford	Prestoungrange Gothenburg, Prestonpans, Scotland	The Yarborough, Brigg, Lincolnshire
2003	Not awarded	Smiths of Bourne, Lincolnshire	Wortley Almshouses, Peterborough	The Bell Inn, Nottingham	None listed
2002	Manor Barn Farm, Southfleet, Kent	Gatekeeper, Westgate Street, Cardiff, Wales	The Test Match, West Bridgford, Nottinghamshire	The Bath Hotel, Sheffield	Holt's Railway, Didsbury, Greater Manchester
2001	None Awarded	Porterhouse, London	Joint: Burton Bridge Brewery Tap, Burton on Trent; Thomson's Bar, Edinburgh	Bull & Butcher, near Henley on Thames	Merchants Arms, Bristol
2000	None Awarded	Sedge Lynn, Manchester	None Awarded	Phoenix, York	The Monkey, Crewe
1999	None Awarded	Joint: Billiard Hall, West Bromwich; Half Moon, Mile End Road, London	Dispensary, Liverpool	None Awarded	Dispensary, Liverpool

== See also ==
- National Pub of the Year
- Heritage pub
- List of public house topics
