= Fat Cat, Norwich =

Pub in Norwich, England

Coordinates: 52.6351°N 1.2756°E

The Fat Cat
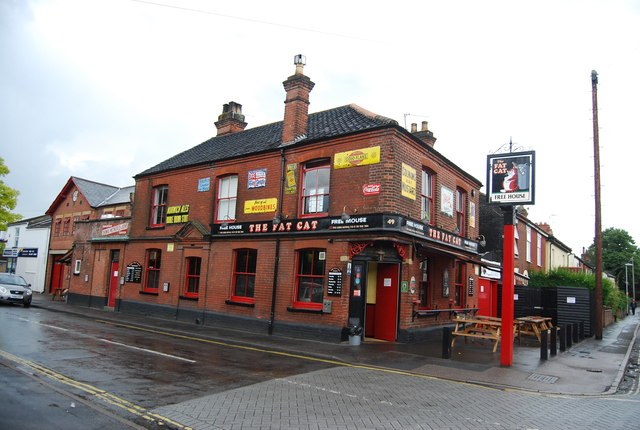
- The Fat Cat in 2011
- Interactive map of the The Fat Cat area

General information
- Location: 49 West End Street, Norwich, Norfolk, United Kingdom

Website
- fatcatpub.co.uk

The Fat Cat is a pub at 49 West End Street, Norwich, Norfolk, England. It is run by the Fat Cat Brewery.

It was CAMRA's National Pub of the Year for 1998 and 2004, as well as its Norwich and Norfolk Pub of the Year in 2012. In 2025, The Daily Telegraph ranked it as the best pub in Norfolk, noting that it had a "reputation as one of the best places to drink beer in England".
