= Spreyton =

Village in Devon, England

Coordinates: 50.75537°N 3.84312°W

- Location within Devon
- Population: 380 (2011 Census)
- OS grid reference: SX6996
- District: West Devon
- Shire county: Devon
- Region: South West
- Country: England
- Sovereign state: United Kingdom
- Post town: Crediton
- Postcode district: EX17
- Dialling code: 01647
- Police: Devon and Cornwall
- Fire: Devon and Somerset
- Ambulance: South Western
- UK Parliament: Central Devon

Spreyton is a small rural village just north of Dartmoor in Devon, England. Spreyton is famous for its connection to the tale of “Old Uncle Tom Cobley and all”. The character Cobley came from and is thought to be buried in Spreyton. Some believe that, if Uncle Tom Cobley did exist and did travel to Widecombe fair, he would have travelled from Spreyton.

Spreyton was mentioned in the Domesday Book (1086) as ""Spreitone" in the ancient hundred of Wonford and in 1236 as "Sprotton". The first element of the name is the Anglo-Saxon word from which "spray" is derived, "spray" meaning "twig" or "brushwood".

There is a small primary school, Spreyton County Primary School, serving the village and the surrounding area. The Tom Cobley Tavern is the village pub, placed on the main street in the village. There is also a parish church, which holds the grave of 'Tom Cobley' within its churchyard.

The parish church of St Michael is built of granite ashlar and stands on a hill. The wagon roofs of the nave, aisle and chancel are medieval; the roof of the chancel has an inscription dated 1451. The Norman font is octagonal. The church is notable for its medieval ceiling boss depicting three hares with shared ears.
