= Widecombe Fair =

Annual fair in Devon, England

Widecombe Fair is an annual fair in England, held in the Dartmoor village of Widecombe-in-the-Moor on the second Tuesday of September. It is well known as the subject of the folk song of the same name, featuring Uncle Tom Cobley and his friends.

== History ==
The earliest written record was in 1850, when it was described in the Plymouth Gazette as a cattle fair. It soon became an opportunity to show and sell other livestock, particularly locally bred sheep and Dartmoor ponies, and by the 1920s it had also become a sports day for local schoolchildren. In 1933, stalls were introduced, selling rural arts and crafts. World War I saw a cancellation of the Fair between 1915 and 1918.

Widecombe Fair was suspended during the Second World War, but reinstated in 1945 with new attractions, including a gymkhana and tug of war. All profits were donated to the 'Local Welcome Home Fund' for returning soldiers, sailors and airmen.

In 1989, it was decided to cancel the pony classes following an outbreak of Equine flu (these were replaced with terrier races, which have continued ever since). The Fair was cancelled altogether in 2001 due to the outbreak of Foot and Mouth Disease, and in 2020 due to the COVID-19 pandemic.

However, despite these interruptions, the event has steadily grown in size and reputation. In its earlier years, it was held in various locations around the village, including the village green. Today, however, it occupies a large field to the south of Widecombe (known to locals as The Fair Field). Other fields become car parks, and a complex policing and marshalling system is put in place, with the narrow lanes transformed into a one-way road system.

Today's visitors will still see displays of quality livestock, although there are many other attractions, including: a dog show, displays of local produce, vintage farm machinery, rural arts and crafts, bale tossing and a now traditional appearance by "Uncle Tom Cobley": a local resident in fancy dress, riding a grey mare.
