= Uncle Tom Cobley =

Phrase from an English folk song

The phrase Uncle Tom Cobley and all is used in British English as a humorous or whimsical way of saying et al., often to express exasperation at the large number of people in a list. The phrase comes from a Devon folk song, "Widecombe Fair", collected around 1890 by Sabine Baring-Gould. Its chorus ends with a long list of people: "Bill Brewer, Jan Stewer, Peter Gurney, Peter Davy, Dan'l Whiddon, Harry Hawke, Old Uncle Tom Cobley and all." The surname is spelt as "Cobleigh" in some references.

== The historical Tom Cobley ==
Whether Tom Cobley, or the other characters from the song, ever existed is uncertain. Local historians have attempted to trace them in and around Dartmoor (for if they did ride to the fair at Widecombe, they may have travelled some distance).

There is some suggestion that his relatives have been traced to a family which had moved to Plymouth in the early 1900s, but that no longer holds the name Cobley.

The strongest claim is held by the village of Spreyton, to the north of the moor, whose churchyard does indeed contain the grave of a Tom Cobley, buried 11 January 1844. However this is said to be the grave of the nephew of the "real" Tom Cobley, who died in 1794 and whose grave is unmarked. Cobley disapproved of his nephew and kept him out of his will (signed at Pascoe house, Colebrooke). The house at Butsford Barton, Colebrooke, was supposed to have been the home of Uncle Tom Cobley.

The original "Uncle Tom Cobley lived in a house near Yeoford Junction, in the Parish of Spreyton. His will was signed on January 20, 1787, and was proved on March 14, 1794. He was a genial old bachelor. Mr Samuel Peach, his oldest relation living, tells me,"My great-uncle, who succeeded him, with whom I lived for some years, died in 1843, over eighty years of age; he married, but left no children."

Old ‘Uncle Tom’ was said to have been an amorous bachelor and when he was young had bright red hair. This characteristic seems to have been to his advantage, for when paternity orders came in thick and fast, he refused to maintain any babies that did not have red hair like himself.

The village has made the most of its link with the folk song. It now has a "Tom Cobley Cottage" and a "Tom Cobley Tavern". There also appears to have been a Bill Brewer who lived in nearby Sticklepath, and a Pearse family who ran a local mill; in Sticklepath there is the grave of a Tom Pearse who died in 1875. However, there remains some doubt as to whether this was the same Tom Pearse who features in the song since the earliest recorded Widecombe Fair was held in 1850.

Early in the 20th century, the novelist Beatrice Chase presented an "Uncle Tom" smock to the organisers of the fair, and now a local resident dressed as Uncle Tom appears at the festivities every year, complete with a grey mare.

His portrait shows him as a young boy.

== Name variants ==
The name "Cobleigh" is of Anglo-Saxon origin. It has many spelling variants, "including Cobley, Coblegh, Cobleigh, Cobligh, Coboleche and others". The name "Cobleigh" seems to be particularly associated with South Devon. It is a predominant form e.g. in the Devon and Exeter Gazette. On 8 November 1909, an obituary claimed that the recently deceased farmer "learned farming, at Colebrook, with the original 'Uncle Tom Cobleigh' ..... who died between 50 and 60 years since. Uncle Tom Cobleigh was partial to sport, and hunted a pack of harriers.", This also names the village of Coiebrooke, but uses the alternative spelling, and gives a vague date of "between" 1849 and 1859.

== Pseudonymous individuals ==
A. J. Coles (Jan Stewer) began his dialect writings with a series called "The Talk at Uncle Tom Cobleigh's Club." Uncle Tom Cobleigh was the founder and respected spokesperson for the club, as Samuel Johnson was for the London Club, and in fiction Samuel Pickwick was for the Pickwick Club. When Coles abruptly terminated his role in the series, it was continued as "The Talk of Uncle Tom Cobleigh", signed pseudonymously by "Tom Cobleigh". When Coles' early stories were re-published in book form, Uncle Tom Cobleigh became a minor character called "Tom Cobley."

== Scientific papers ==
There have been instances of scientific papers—where multiple authorship is common—published with "Cobley, U. T." humorously listed as one among a long list of otherwise genuine authors. Two papers indexed by ISI include U. T. Cobley as a co-author:

- Nosten F, Luxemburger C, Kyle D, Ballou W, Wittes J, Wah E, Chongsuphajaisiddhi T, Gordon D, White N (1996). "Randomised double-blind placebo-controlled trial of SPf66 malaria vaccine in children in northwestern Thailand". The Lancet. 348 (9029): 701–7. doi:10.1016/S0140-6736(96)04465-0. PMID 8806288. S2CID 54282604. (UT Cobley is listed as a member of the Shoklo SPf66 Malaria Vaccine Trial Group at the end of the paper.)
- Batich C, Heilbronner E, Hornung V, Ashe AJ, Clark DT, Cobley UT, Kilcast D, Scanlan I (1973). "Applications of photoelectron spectroscopy. 41. Photoelectron spectra of phosphabenzene, arsabenzene, and stibabenzene". Journal of the American Chemical Society. 95 (3): 928–30. doi:10.1021/ja00784a054.

There are also some cases of papers listed with U. T. Cobley as an author in reference lists, even though the name does not appear in the original paper. This also shows how citation errors are perpetuated, presumably reflecting a reliance on other citations without checking the original source. Thus a paper by Cross, Heyworth, Murrell, Bockamp, Dexter and Green, published in the journal Oncogene in 1994, is frequently listed with the authors cited as "Cross, M. A., Heyworth, C. M., Murrell, A. M., Bockamp, E.-O., Cobley, U. T., Dexter, T. M. & Green, A. R." (e.g. in 1999 papers by Sinclair et al. and by Begley & Green). However, Cobley does not appear in the original.

== Other occurrences ==
Tom Cobleigh is the name of a chain of pubs/restaurants acquired by the Spirit Group in the UK in 2003.

Tom Cobleigh, his mare and the song are also loosely but obviously referenced in the last few lines of folk duo Show of Hands's own song "Widecombe Fair", which differs dramatically from the original. In this version the narrator of the song hints at a more sinister reason for the loan of the horse, he needs it to travel with the others named in the original song to a remote tavern whose landlord he suspects (with good reason) of murdering a young boy. Although it is never stated we can assume that the character in this song intends to take his revenge on the murderer. Steve Knightley, Show of Hands' lead vocalist and writer of their version, claims that it was inspired by historical research that has suggested that the original folk song may actually have been intended to convey a darker meaning than is commonly supposed.
