= Timeline of London (19th century) =

The following is a timeline of the history of London in the 19th century, the capital of England and the United Kingdom.

== 1800 to 1809 ==
- 1800
  - 8 January: The first soup kitchens are opened in London.
  - 13 January: The Royal Institution is granted a royal charter.
  - 22 March: The Company of Surgeons is granted a royal charter to become the Royal College of Surgeons in London.
  - 15 May: George III survives 2 assassination attempts in London. In Hyde Park, a bullet intended for him hits a man standing alongside, and later at the Theatre Royal, Drury Lane, 2 bullets fired by an insane man hit the wooden panel behind him.
  - In London, Henry Maudslay develops the first industrially practical screw-cutting lathe, which allows for the standardisation of screw thread sizes for the first time, and at about this date develops a bench micrometer.
- 1801
  - 1 March: The London Stock Exchange is founded as a regulated institution; its new building is completed on 30 December.
  - 10 March: The first British census is carried out. London's population is 128,129 in the City, 831,181 in the county, and 1,114,644 in Greater London.
  - 25 April: Humphry Davy begins his popular series of scientific lectures at the Royal Institution's Albemarle Street headquarters.
- 1802
  - 19 April: Joseph Grimaldi first presents his white-faced clown character "Joey", at Sadler's Wells Theatre.
  - May: Marie Tussaud first exhibits her wax sculptures in London.
  - 28 June: The balloonist André-Jacques Garnerin ascends from Chelsea.
  - 5 July: Garnerin and Edward Hawke Locker make a 17-mile (27.4-kilometre) balloon flight from Lord's Cricket Ground in St John's Wood to Chingford in just over 15 minutes.
  - 10 July: The Grand Junction Canal opens its arm to Paddington Basin, and a passenger boat service to Uxbridge starts.
  - 31 July: William Wordsworth witnesses the early morning scene leaving London for Dover and Calais with his sister Dorothy, which he captures in his sonnet "Composed upon Westminster Bridge".
  - 27 August: The West India Docks, the first commercial docks in London, open.
  - 16 November: The ringleaders of the Despard Plot are arrested. On 21 February 1803, 7 are hanged and decapitated publicly at Horsemonger Lane Gaol before a crowd of at least 20,000, making it one of the largest public gatherings ever up to this date.
  - The London Fever Hospital founded.
- 1803
  - After April: Richard Trevithick's London Steam Carriage is demonstrated on the roads.
  - 26 July: The Surrey Iron Railway, a horse-worked wagonway between Wandsworth and Croydon, opens, making it the first public railway line in England.
  - Summer: The Stafford Gallery at Cleveland House, the private art collection of the Marquess of Stafford's family, is first opened to the public by invitation.
  - Frederick Albert Winsor gives a demonstration of gas lighting at the old Lyceum Theatre.
  - Trinity Buoy Wharf established.
  - The Globe newspaper begins publication.
- 1804
  - 3 January: The Hammersmith Ghost murder case takes place.
  - 7 March: The Horticultural Society of London is founded.
  - The rebuilding of Pitzhanger Manor in Ealing by John Soane for his own use is completed.
- 1805
  - 20 January: The London Docks open.
  - 25 March: Moorfields Eye Hospital is opened as the London Dispensary for Curing Diseases of the Eye and Ear by John Cunningham Saunders.
  - June: The British Institution for Promoting the Fine Arts in the United Kingdom is founded as a group of connoisseurs. On 18 January 1806, it opens the former Boydell Shakespeare Gallery on Pall Mall as the "British Gallery", and it alternates the world's first regular temporary exhibitions of Old Master paintings with sale exhibitions of the work of living artists.
  - 4 June: The first Trooping the Colour ceremony takes place on Horse Guards Parade.
  - September: The merchantman Boddington (1781 ship) is stranded and wrecked in the Thames off Blackwall.
  - 6 November: The news of the victory at Trafalgar and Nelson's death reaches London in the early hours of this morning, with the bearer, Lieut. Lapenotière, having made his last change of horses on his post from Falmouth the previous evening at Hounslow.
  - 9 December: City Canal opens across the Isle of Dogs; it is later incorporated into West India Docks.
  - The Bow Street Horse Patrol is re-established as a police force.
  - The Royal Arsenal, Woolwich is given its Royal prefix.
- 1806
  - 9 January: The funeral procession of Lord Nelson takes place from The Admiralty to St Paul's Cathedral.
  - 18 January: The London Institution is founded to promote higher education.
  - The East India Docks are completed.
  - The Royal Military Academy, Woolwich opens its new building designed by James Wyatt.
  - The Royal Philanthropic Society is incorporated.
- 1807
  - 28 January: The first demonstration of street gas lighting takes place on Pall Mall.
  - 23 February: 1807 Newgate disaster: Around 40 people are killed in a crush attending a public hanging.
  - 13 March: The dock at Rotherhithe built by the Grand Surrey Canal company opens, and the first section of canal follows.
  - Addington Palace becomes a summer residence of the Archbishops of Canterbury, with Croydon Palace being sold.
- 1808
  - 8 July–18 September: Richard Trevithick's steam locomotive Catch Me Who Can is demonstrated in London.
  - 20 September: The original Theatre Royal, Covent Garden is destroyed by fire along with most of the scenery, costumes, and scripts. Its rebuilding begins in December.
- 1809
  - 24 February: The Theatre Royal, Drury Lane is destroyed by fire. On being encountered drinking in the street while watching the conflagration, the proprietor, Richard Brinsley Sheridan, is reported as saying: "A man may surely be allowed to take a glass of wine by his own fireside."
  - 18 September: A new Theatre Royal, Covent Garden opens to replace the first burnt down in 1808, with a performance of Macbeth. An increase in ticket prices causes the Old Price Riots which last for 64 days until the manager, John Philip Kemble, reverses the price rise.
  - 19 September: Cabinet ministers Viscount Castlereagh (Secretary of State for War and the Colonies) and George Canning (Secretary of State for Foreign Affairs) fight a duel with pistols on Putney Heath over policy in the Walcheren Campaign.
  - 22 October: The Croydon Canal opens.
  - 10 November: The Berners Street Hoax takes place, in which Theodore Hook manages to attract dozens of people to 54 Berners Street.
  - William Bullock moves his museum of curiosities from Liverpool to become the London Museum in Piccadilly.

== 1810 to 1819 ==
- 1810
  - April: Rioting after the imprisonment of Sir Francis Burdett, MP, who has been charged with libel against Parliament after calling for reform of the House of Commons.
  - 8 July: Vere Street Coterie: Police raid a "molly house" and arrest 27 men for sodomy or attempted sodomy, with a man and a boy being eventually hanged on conviction.
  - The Stepney Academy is established as a Baptist ministry training college.
  - The Rev. Dr. William Pearson establishes Temple Grove School in East Sheen, perhaps the earliest preparatory school in the country.
  - Sake Dean Mahomet opens the Hindoostanee Coffee House, making it the first Indian restaurant in London.
  - Thomas Cubitt sets up his building firm in Gray's Inn Road.
  - Bryanston Square and Montagu Square are laid out on the Portman Estate,.
- 1811
  - 7–19 December: The Ratcliff Highway murders take place; the principal suspect commits suicide and is buried at a crossroads with a stake through his heart.
  - The building of Regent Street begins John Nash's development of the West End.
  - The building of the Tobacco Dock begins.
  - The music publisher Novello & Co is in business.
- 1812
  - 13 April: An attempted road tunnel at Archway collapses during construction.
  - 11 May: The Prime Minister, Spencer Perceval, is assassinated by John Bellingham in the House of Commons lobby.
  - 10 October: The rebuilt Theatre Royal, Drury Lane opens.
  - Gas street lighting begins.
  - The New North Road is built as a turnpike.
  - The Egyptian Hall is completed in Piccadilly for the display of William Bullock's collection of curiosities.
  - French chef Jacques Mivart founds a hotel in Mayfair that will become Claridge's.
- 1813
  - 24 January: The Philharmonic Society of London is formed; it holds its first concert on 8 March.
  - 21 August: The Archway Road cutting opens.
  - 25 December: William Debenham joins Thomas Clark in a partnership to manage a draper's store in London, origin of the later Debenhams department stores.
  - 27 December–3 January 1814: A thick fog blankets London causing the Prince Regent to turn back from a trip to Hatfield House and a mail coach to take 7 hours to reach Uxbridge on its way to Birmingham.
  - 31 December: Westminster Bridge is illuminated by gas lighting provided by the Gas Light and Coke Company from the world's first public gasworks nearby.
- 1814

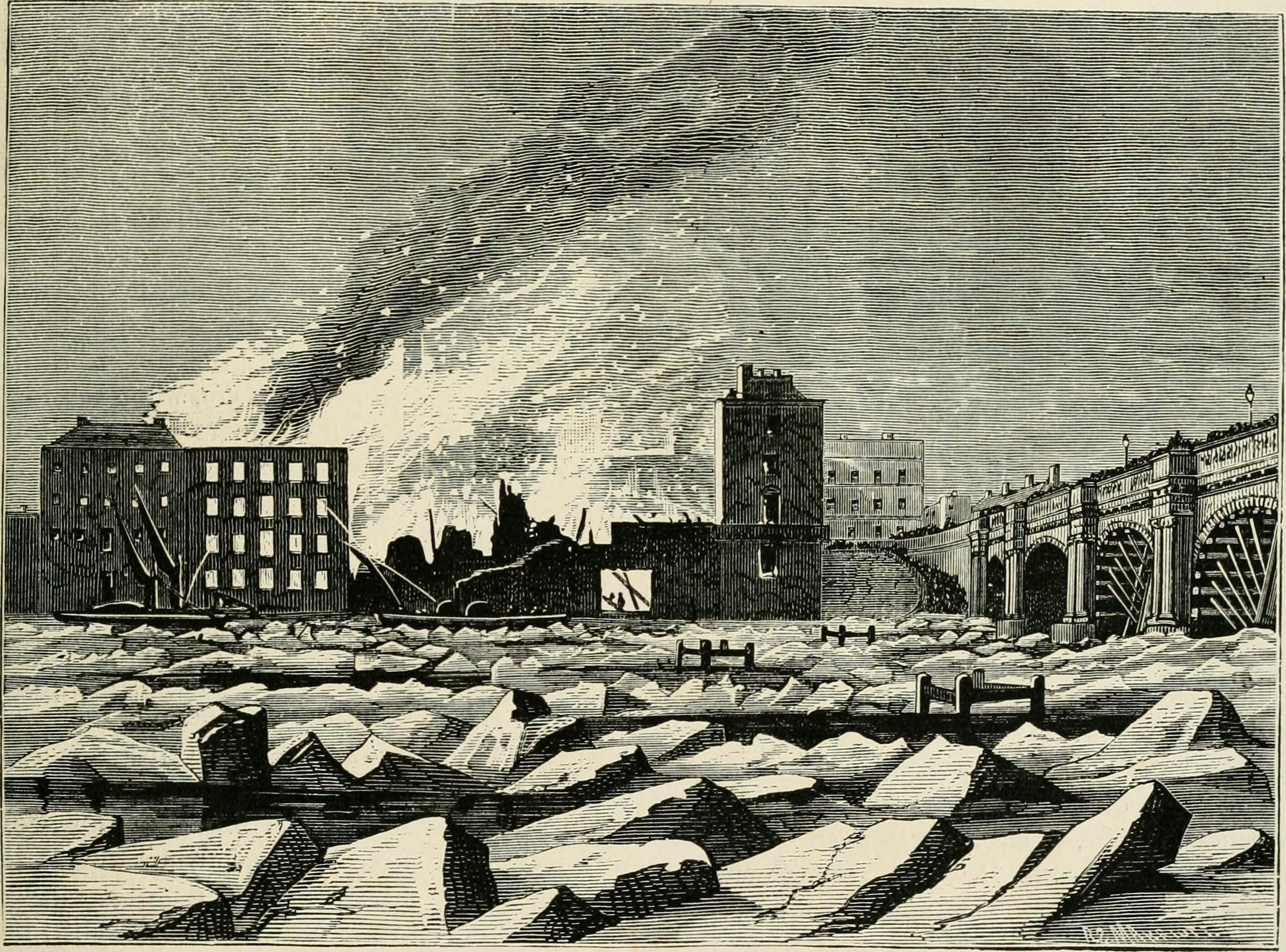
The frozen Thames illustrated in Old and New London (1873)

  - 14 January: The last River Thames frost fair takes place.
  - 12 February: A fire destroys the Custom House.
  - 21 February: The Great Stock Exchange Fraud takes place.
  - 1 April: The Gas Light and Coke Company begins the world's first permanent public gas lighting of streets in the parish of St Margaret's, Westminster, extending to other parts of London by 25 December.
  - April: King Louis XVIII of France visits the city.
  - 20 June: The London Victory Parade of 1814 takes place.
  - 1 August: The Grand Jubilee of 1814 in The Royal Parks takes place, where the re-enactment of a naval battle and pyrotechnics kills 2 people.
  - 28 August: Most of the remains of Winchester Palace in Southwark are destroyed in a fire.
  - 17 October: The London Beer Flood takes place, where a large vat of porter in Meux's Brewery bursts, demolishing buildings and killing 9 people.
- 1815
  - 23 January: Margery is the first Thames steamer known to enter regular service on the "Long Ferry" to Gravesend.
  - 7 April: Lord Byron and Walter Scott meet for the first time in the offices of the publisher John Murray, 50 Albemarle Street.
  - 21 June: News of the Battle of Waterloo (18 June) reaches London late this evening, and on 23 June, the streets are illuminated in celebration.
  - 4 November: The foundation stone of new building for London Institution in Finsbury Circus is laid, making it the first major building contract for Thomas Cubitt.
  - The London Docks are completed in Wapping.
  - Jones, Watts and Doulton begins life as a stoneware pottery in Lambeth.
  - Cesspits are permitted to be connected to the London sewer system.
- 1816
  - 4 June: The first Vauxhall Bridge opens, making it the first iron bridge over the Thames.
  - 14 June: The Society for the Promotion of Permanent and Universal Peace is founded.
  - 22 June: The Regent, designed by Marc Isambard Brunel and built by Henry Maudsley, the first Thames-built steamboat, is demonstrated on the river. She is put into service on the "Long Ferry" to Margate. This year also sees the first steam tug on the Thames, the Majestic.
  - 26 June: Millbank Prison, the National Penitentiary, admits its first prisoners, all of whom are women.
  - 12 August: The Regent's Canal opens from Paddington to Camden.
  - 15 November & 2 December: The Spa Fields riots take place by the supporters of the radical Thomas Spence.
  - The English Opera House opens.
  - The music publisher Boosey moves to Holles Street.
  - The Royal Small Arms Factory is completed in Enfield.
  - The name Griffin Brewery is first applied to the 17th-century site in Chiswick.
- 1817
  - 4 February: The new St Marylebone Parish Church is consecrated.
  - 18 June: The first Waterloo Bridge, designed by John Rennie, opens.
  - 6 August: Gas lighting is introduced on stage in the West End theatre by The English Opera House, which then extends to the auditorium on 8 September. On 6 September, it is introduced at the Theatre Royal, Drury Lane, where it is already installed in the auditorium and foyer, and the Theatre Royal, Covent Garden as a demonstration.
  - The Dulwich Picture Gallery, designed by John Soane as the first purpose-built public art gallery, is completed and opens to the public.
  - Apsley House is acquired by Arthur Wellesley, 1st Duke of Wellington from his brother.
  - Percival Norton Johnson sets up as a gold assayer, origin of the Johnson Matthey business.
  - The Wimbledon Windmill is built.
- 1818
  - 11 May: The Old Vic is founded as the Royal Coburg Theatre in South London by James King, Daniel Dunn and John T. Serres.
  - The alterations to the King's Theatre by the architect John Nash and George Repton are completed. This includes the construction at the rear of the Royal Opera Arcade, London's first shopping arcade.
- 1819
  - Early: Denis Johnson of Long Acre markets his "pedestrian curricle", a form of dandy horse, velocipede or kick scooter.
  - 20 March: Burlington Arcade opens.
  - 24 March: The first Southwark Bridge, designed by John Rennie as a toll bridge with iron arches, opens.
  - April: John Keats begins his "Great Year" or "Living Year", during which he is at his most productive, having given up work at Guy's Hospital and taken up residence at a new house, Wentworth Place, on Hampstead Heath. On 3 April, Charles Wentworth Dilke lets his house, next door to Keats, to Mrs Brawne, whose daughter Fanny becomes the love of Keats' life. Between 21 April and the end of May Keats writes La Belle Dame sans Merci and most of his major odes: Ode to Psyche, Ode on a Grecian Urn, Ode to a Nightingale, Ode on Indolence, and Ode on Melancholy. In the summer he writes Lamia, and on 19 October, he proposes marriage to Fanny.
  - 21 April: The new building for the London Institution in Finsbury Circus opens.
  - The Travellers Club is founded.
  - The bookseller William Pickering is in business as a publisher.

== 1820 to 1829 ==
- 1820
  - 23 February: The Cato Street conspiracy, a plot to murder the Cabinet, is exposed. On 1 May, the conspirators suffer the last judicial decapitation in the UK after their public hanging for treason outside Newgate Prison (legally, a mitigation of the last sentence in Britain of hanging, drawing and quartering).
  - 10 March: The Astronomical Society of London is established.
  - 1 August: The Regent's Canal opens from Camden to the Limehouse Basin.
  - c. September: John Constable begins painting on Hampstead Heath on a regular basis.
  - Approximate date: Clerkenwell Prison in operation.
- 1821
  - 4 July: The redesigned Haymarket Theatre opens.
  - 19 July: George IV is crowned in Westminster Abbey. His estranged wife, Caroline of Brunswick, is turned away from the coronation ceremony, and this is also the last coronation at which the full ceremony of the King's Champion is carried out.
  - 14 August: The funeral procession of Caroline of Brunswick (who died on 7 August at Brandenburgh House in Hammersmith) is forced by the crowd to take a route through the centre of London, contrary to the plans of the authorities; 2 men are killed in the disturbances.
  - December: The "Spa Fields Congregational families" begin an Owenite community in Islington, inspired by George Mudie.
  - The De Beauvoir Town and Ladbroke Estate developments begin.
- 1822
  - 20 October: The first edition of The Sunday Times newspaper is published under this title.
  - The Royal Academy of Music founded, initially near Hanover Square with William Crotch as first principal. It opens in March 1823 before the Royal charter is granted in June 1830.
- 1823
  - Dr. George Birkbeck establishes the London Mechanics' Institute, predecessor of Birkbeck, University of London.
  - Finsbury Midwifery Institution is established.
  - Pimm's oyster bar is in business.
- 1824
  - 16 February: The Athenaeum Club is founded, and is established in temporary premises by May.
  - 10 May: The National Gallery opens to the public in John Julius Angerstein's former house on Pall Mall.
  - 14 August: The Newington Academy for Girls, a Quaker establishment, issues its first prospectus.
  - 30 November: Banker Henry Fauntleroy is hanged for forgery before a crowd of 100,000 people.
  - Thomas Cubitt is commissioned by Richard Grosvenor, 2nd Marquess of Westminster, to create a great swathe of building in Belgravia centred on Belgrave Square and Pimlico. The following year, Cubitt begins to lay out estates in Clapham.
  - The drapery business that will become Harrods department store is opened by Charles Henry Harrod, initially in Southwark.
  - The Grosvenor Canal opens in Pimlico.
- 1825
  - 21 March: The British première of Ludwig van Beethoven's Symphony No. 9 (1824) is presented by the Philharmonic Society of London, who had commissioned it in 1817, at its Argyll Rooms conducted by Sir George Smart and with the choral "Ode to Joy" sung in Italian.
  - 15 June: The foundation stone for the new London Bridge is laid.
  - 19 December: First of the annual Royal Institution Christmas Lectures, which will continue for two centuries.
  - 3–5 Porchester Terrace is built in Westminster.
  - Regent Street is laid out.
  - The reconstruction of Buckingham Palace by the architect John Nash takes place.
  - The first horse-drawn omnibuses are established in London.
  - The Terrific Register: Or, Record of Crimes, Judgments, Providences, and Calamities is first published.
  - Approximate date: London is estimated to overtake Peking as the world's largest city.
- 1826
  - 11 February: The University of London is established.
  - 1 March: The male Indian elephant Chunee, which was brought to London in 1811, is killed at Edward Cross's Royal Grand National Menagerie at Exeter Exchange on The Strand after running amok the week before in The Strand, killing one of his keepers. After arsenic and shooting fail, the animal is stabbed to death. The Exchange is demolished in 1829.
  - April: The Zoological Society of London is established.
  - The King's Library, the first purpose-built part of the British Museum, is completed.
  - The bridge over The Serpentine, designed by John and George Rennie, opens.
  - The Waterman's Arms pub is built in Putney.
  - The Society for the Diffusion of Useful Knowledge is established.
  - London, Ontario is established.
- 1827
  - 21 May: The Standard newspaper begins publication.
  - 6 October: The first Hammersmith Bridge, a toll suspension bridge over the Thames, opens.
  - Clarence House is completed in Westminster.
  - The remodelling of St. James's Park by John Nash is completed.
  - The Metropolitan Turnpike Trust is established.
- 1828
  - 17 April: The Royal Free Hospital, established as the London General Institution for the Gratuitous Care of Malignant Diseases by surgeon William Marsden, opens.
  - 27 April: London Zoo opens in Regent's Park for members of the Zoological Society of London, the first scientific zoo in the United Kingdom, and the Tower of London menagerie is transferred there.
  - 21 June: King's College London is founded as a secular institution.
  - July: The stone Kingston Bridge opens.
  - 12 August: The Kensington Canal opens.
  - 25 October: St Katharine Docks open.
  - The new Guildhall Library opens.
  - Samuel Reiss's Grand Cigar Divan opens.
- 1829
  - 21 March: A duel is fought between the Prime Minister, the Duke of Wellington, and George Finch-Hatton, 10th Earl of Winchilsea, in Battersea Fields, provoked by the Duke's support for Catholic Emancipation and foundation of the secular King's College London. Deliberately off-target shots are fired by both, and honour is satisfied without injury.
  - 4 July: George Shillibeer introduces his 3-horse Omnibus between the Yorkshire Stingo near Paddington Green and Bank via the New Road.
  - 29 September: The Metropolitan Police of Sir Robert Peel starts operation within a 7-mile (11 km) radius of Charing Cross.
  - November: Thomas Hornor's Panoramic view of London, the largest panoramic painting ever created, is completed in the London Colosseum, purpose-designed by Decimus Burton in Regent's Park.
  - The General Post Office headquarters building in St Martin's Le Grand is completed.

== 1830 to 1839 ==
- 1830
  - 5 February: A fire destroys the Argyll Rooms, where the Philharmonic Society of London presents concerts, but firefighters are able to prevent its further spread by use of their new equipment, steam-powered fire engines.
  - Spring: The Hertford Union Canal opens to connect the Regent's Canal with the Lee Navigation.
  - 28 July: Joseph Grantham is the first police officer to be killed on duty in the UK, in Somers Town.
  - 6 December: The city's Court of Common Council orders removal of inscriptions on the Monument to the Great Fire of London and the house in Pudding Lane where the fire started falsely blaming it on Papists.
  - 16 December: The last hanging for piracy takes place at Execution Dock, Wapping.
  - The Geographical Society of London is founded.
  - The London Mechanics' Institute admits its first female students.
  - Price's Patent Candles is founded by William Wilson in Vauxhall.
- 1831
  - 29 March: Exeter Hall opens on The Strand.
  - 16 May: The Middlesex County Asylum for pauper lunatics opens in Hanwell under the humane superintendence of William Charles Ellis.
  - July–August 1832: St Dunstan-in-the-West church in Fleet Street is rebuilt.
  - 1 August: The new London Bridge is officially opened in the presence of the new king, William IV.
  - 8 September: The coronation of King William IV takes place in Westminster Abbey.
  - c. September: Lowther Arcade opens.
  - October: King's College London opens.
  - 5 December: London Burkers John Bishop and Thomas Williams, body snatchers operating since 1830 from Nova Scotia Gardens, Shoreditch, are hanged outside Newgate Prison before a crowd of 30,000 for murder and their bodies removed for anatomization.
  - The Royal Surrey Gardens are laid out as zoological and pleasure gardens.
  - Young's take over the 16th-century Ram Brewery in Wandsworth.
  - The house which will eventually contain Abbey Road Studios is built in the St John's Wood district.
- 1832
  - 12 February: The Second cholera pandemic begins to spread in London, starting from the East End. Although it is declared officially over in early May, deaths continue, and it will claim at least 3,000 victims.
  - 11 July: The Kensal Green Cemetery is authorised by Act of Parliament, making it the first of the "Magnificent Seven cemeteries". It is consecrated on 24 January 1833.
  - 7 November: The Northfields Allotments are established.
  - The UK Parliament constituencies of Finsbury, Lambeth, Marylebone, and Tower Hamlets are established.
- 1833
  - 1 January: The London Fire Engine Establishment is formed under the leadership of James Braidwood, merging the existing insurance company brigades.
  - The new Hungerford Market building and Leather Market (Bermondsey) open.
- 1834
  - 14 July: The Lyceum Theatre opens.
  - 16 October: The Burning of Parliament takes place.
  - 23 December: Architect and inventor Joseph Hansom patents the Hansom cab.
  - The Old Bailey is renamed as the Central Criminal Court.
  - The fourth Fishmongers' Hall is opened.
  - The Institute of British Architects in London, predecessor of the Royal Institute of British Architects, is formed.
  - Charles Henry Harrod establishes a grocery business in Stepney in the East End, a further predecessor of Harrods department store.
- 1835
  - 23 March: Marie Tussaud moves her wax museum, Madame Tussauds, to a permanent location on Baker Street, London.
  - November: The Grand Junction Canal company's Kingsbury ("Welsh Harp") Reservoir in Brent is first filled.
  - Regent's Park opens to the public.
  - The Geological Museum is founded as The Museum of Practical Geology.
- 1836
  - 2 January: Bentley's Miscellany literary magazine begins publication under the editorship of Charles Dickens.
  - 8 February: The first section of London and Greenwich Railway, the first steam-worked line in London, begins operating between Spa Road and Deptford.
  - 2 April: Charles Dickens marries Catherine Hogarth at St Luke's Church, Chelsea.
  - 7 June: The first University Boat Race is held on the Thames in London, with Cambridge winning.
  - 9 June: The London Working Men's Association is formed; it is later a centre for Chartism.
  - 28 November: The University of London is chartered.
  - December: Dickens first meets his lifelong friend, the biographer and critic John Forster.
  - 14 December: The London and Greenwich Railway (L&GR) trains begin to start calling at London Bridge station, making it the first permanent London terminus.
  - The statue of King George IV at Kings Cross is completed by this date; it is demolished in 1845.
- 1837
  - 11 January: The Royal Institute of British Architects in London is granted its royal charter.
  - 20 January: The death of the neo-classical architect Sir John Soane gives effect to the creation of his London house as the Sir John Soane's Museum.
  - February: Serialisation of Charles Dickens' novel Oliver Twist begins in Bentley's Miscellany.
  - 1 June: The Government-funded Normal School of Design, predecessor of the Royal College of Art, begins classes at Somerset House.
  - 3 June: The London Hippodrome opens in Bayswater.
  - 20 June: At 6.00 a.m., Francis Conyngham, 2nd Marquess Conyngham (Lord Chamberlain) and William Howley (Archbishop of Canterbury) call on Princess Victoria of Kent at Kensington Palace to tell her she has become Queen Victoria on the death of her uncle William IV. On 13 July, she moves from Kensington Palace into Buckingham Palace, making her the first reigning British monarch to make this their London home rather than St James's Palace.
  - 20 July: Euston railway station, London's first mainline railway terminus, is opened by the London and Birmingham Railway.
  - 28 August: The Army and Navy Club is founded.
  - 7 December: The West Norwood Cemetery is consecrated after it was authorised in 1836.
  - The Art Union of London is founded.
  - Brown's Hotel is established.
  - James Watney becomes a partner in the Stag Brewery, Pimlico.
- 1838
  - 10 January: A fire destroys Lloyd's Coffee House and the Royal Exchange.
  - 8 April: The National Gallery first opens to the public in the building purpose-designed for it by William Wilkins in Trafalgar Square, which is being cleared at the time.
  - 4 June: The first section of the Great Western Railway opens from the original London Paddington station to Maidenhead.
  - 28 June: The coronation of Queen Victoria takes place in Westminster Abbey.
  - 6 August: The Polytechnic Institution, Britain's first polytechnic, opens on Regent Street.
  - The state rooms and gardens at Hampton Court Palace open to the public free of charge.
  - Kew Bridge Pumping Station in Brentford begins operation.
  - The Langham Sketching Club is formed.
- 1839
  - 20 May: Highgate Cemetery is dedicated.
  - 5 June: The London and Croydon Railway begins operating.
  - 13 September–October: Whilst visiting from France, M. de St Croix, displays Daguerreotypes in London and takes some of his own, three of which survive, including Parliament Street from Trafalgar Square, considered the earliest known photographs of the city.
  - The Sisters of Mercy establish the first Roman Catholic convent in England since the Reformation in Bermondsey.
  - The City of London Police is given statutory authority.

== 1840 to 1849 ==
- 1840
  - 14 January: A Chartist rising in the East End is largely suppressed by the police.
  - 10 February: Queen Victoria marries Prince Albert of Saxe-Coburg and Gotha in St James's Palace.
  - 15 April
    - King's College Hospital opens on Portugal Street.
    - The West London Synagogue is established.
  - 27 April: The foundation stone of the new Palace of Westminster is laid as its reconstruction following the Burning of Parliament in 1834 begins; it is completed in 1860.
  - June: The World Anti-Slavery Convention is held in Exeter Hall.
  - 1 July: The Eastern Counties Railway is extended to a new London terminus at Bishopsgate railway station, known as Shoreditch until 1847.
  - 6 July: The cable worked London and Blackwall Railway opens to a temporary City terminus in Minories.
  - 15 September: The Northern and Eastern Railway opens its first section from Stratford together with the first Stratford Depot, which over the next 100 years will become the largest motive power depot in the UK.
  - 30 September: The foundation of Nelson's Column is laid, with Trafalgar Square being laid out and paved during the year.
  - Abney Park, Nunhead, and Brompton, three of the "Magnificent Seven cemeteries", are opened.
  - Bridgewater House, Westminster, designed by Charles Barry in the Palazzo style as the town house of the Earl of Ellesmere to replace Cleveland House (and incorporating the Bridgewater Gallery for the family art collection) begins construction, and it is completed in 1854.
  - Construction of Norwood New Town begins.
  - W. Harrison Ainsworth's novels Guy Fawkes and The Tower of London and Charles Dickens' The Old Curiosity Shop are serialised.
- 1841
  - February–November: Charles Dickens' novel Barnaby Rudge: A Tale of the Riots of 'Eighty is published serially.
  - 8 March: The Hospital for Consumption and Diseases of the Chest, predecessor of the Royal Brompton Hospital, is established.
  - March: Richard Beard opens England's first commercial photographic studio in London, producing daguerreotype portraits.
  - by April: The Royal Botanic Gardens, Kew is first opened to the public.
  - 3 May: The London Library begins operation on Pall Mall.
  - 6 June: The United Kingdom Census 1841 takes place. London's population is 123,563 in the City, 1,825,714 in the county, and 2,235,344 in Greater London.
  - 14 June: The Surrey County Lunatic Asylum opens in Tooting.
  - 12 July: The London and Brighton Railway begins operating from Norwood Junction; it is extended through to Brighton on 21 September.
  - 17 July: The magazine Punch begins publication.
  - 2 August: Fenchurch Street railway station opens for the London and Blackwall Railway.
  - 30 October: A fire at the Tower of London destroys its Grand Armoury and causes £250,000 worth of damage.
  - 12 November: The Jewish Chronicle newspaper begins publication.
  - The City of London and Tower Hamlets Cemetery, last of the "Magnificent Seven cemeteries" opens.
  - The Fourth plinth, Trafalgar Square, is constructed for an equestrian statue of William IV, but this is never erected due to lack of funds, and it remains empty until 1999.
  - The Metropolitan Association for Improving the Dwellings of the Industrious Classes is founded.
  - Whitelands College is established by the Church of England's National Society as a teacher training college for women on the King's Road, Chelsea, the first college of higher education in the UK to admit women.
  - The Chemical Society of London and the London Philanthropic Society are founded.
- 1842
  - 14 May: The Illustrated London News begins publication.
  - 15 August: The Metropolitan Police establishes a Detective Branch.
  - 10 & 19 November: The Fleet Prison and Marshalsea debtor's prisons are closed, and inmates transferred to Queen's Bench Prison. Pentonville Prison for criminals is completed in Barnsbury this year.
  - Charles Edward Mudie begins his Mudie's Select Library business from his stationery shop in Bloomsbury.
- 1843
  - 20 January: Daniel M'Naghten shoots and kills the Prime Minister's private secretary, Edward Drummond, in Whitehall.
  - 25 March: Marc Isambard Brunel's Thames Tunnel, the first tunnel under the river, opens to pedestrians.
  - 2 September: The Economist newspaper first published after the preliminary issue dated in August.
  - 3–4 November: The statue of Nelson is placed atop Nelson's Column in Trafalgar Square.
  - The development of Cubitt Town begins.
  - The International Peace Congress is held.
- 1844
  - 27 May: The West London Railway opens.
  - 6 June: The Young Men's Christian Association (YMCA) is founded in St Paul's Churchyard by George Williams.
  - 9 August: Metropolitan Buildings Act 1844 (7 & 8 Vict. c. 84) regulates new construction in London in respect of public safety and health, requires domestic plumbing to be connected to the London sewerage system and creates the Metropolitan Buildings Office as regulator from 1845.
  - 28 October: The Royal Exchange opens.
  - The first eel and mash shop in London is recorded.
- 1845
  - 3 January: The first known arrest of a fugitive through use of the new electric telegraph is achieved when murderer John Tawell is arrested after being followed by a detective alerted prior to Tawell's arrival at Paddington station.
  - 7 February: In the British Museum, a drunken visitor smashes the Portland Vase, which takes months to repair.
  - 15 March: The first University Boat Race to use the modern-day Putney to Mortlake course takes place, albeit in the reverse direction to that later adopted.
  - 26 March: The Sisterhood of the Holy Cross ('Park Village Community') is established as the first Anglican sisterhood to minister to the poor of St Pancras.
  - 1 May
    - Hungerford Bridge opens as a tolled suspension footbridge.
    - The first cricket match is played at the Kennington Oval.
  - Fuller's Brewery is established as a partnership to run the Griffin Brewery in Chiswick.
  - The laying out of Victoria Park in the East End, the first "People's Park", begins.
  - The Metropolitan Buildings Office is established.
- 1846
  - 3 April: The last London-based mail coach runs to Norwich.
  - 26 August: The North London Railway is authorised as the East & West India Docks & Birmingham Junction Railway, which opens from 1850.
  - Henry Poole opens an entrance to his tailoring premises from Savile Row, beginning a tradition of Savile Row tailoring.
- 1847
  - New Oxford Street is constructed.
  - The entrance wing to the British Museum is constructed.
  - The Royal Brompton Hospital admits its first patients.
  - Bernard Quaritch sets up his own bookselling business.
- 1848
  - 10 April: "Monster" Chartist rally on Kennington Common.
  - 21 April–23 November: Frédéric Chopin visits London and Scotland, with his last public appearance on a concert platform being on 16 November at the Guildhall.
  - 4 July: St George's Church, Southwark is opened, making it the largest post-Reformation Roman Catholic church in London at this date, becoming a cathedral in 1852. The first marriage held here is of its architect, Augustus Pugin, on 10 August.
  - 11 July: Waterloo station opens for the London & South Western Railway.
  - October: The Palm house at the Royal Botanic Gardens, Kew, designed by the architect Decimus Burton and the iron-founder Richard Turner, is completed and opened.
  - The Duke of Wellington, Constable of the Tower since 1826, has a north bastion added to the Tower of London in response to the Chartist threat.
  - The Metropolitan Evening Classes for Young Men, predecessor of London Metropolitan University, are instituted at Crosby Hall, Bishopsgate by Rev. Charles Mackenzie.
  - The Metropolitan Association for Improving the Dwellings of the Industrious Classes completes its first dwellings, the Metropolitan Buildings in Kings Cross.
  - Queen's College, London is founded, making it the world's first school to award academic qualifications to young women.
  - Samuel Reiss's Grand Cigar Divan becomes Simpson's Grand Divan Tavern.
- 1849
  - May: The first exhibition of paintings by the Pre-Raphaelite Brotherhood: John Everett Millais' Isabella and Holman Hunt's Rienzi are shown at the Royal Academy summer exhibition, and Dante Gabriel Rossetti's Girlhood of Mary Virgin at the Institution for the Free Exhibition of Modern Art's "St. George's Gallery" in Knightsbridge next to Hyde Park Corner.
  - Summer: Karl Marx moves from Paris to London, where he will spend the remainder of his life.
  - July: The Horsleydown cholera outbreak (Second cholera pandemic of 1849–51) takes place.
  - 31 July: The Church of the Immaculate Conception, Farm Street, Mayfair opens, making it London's first post-Reformation Jesuit church.
  - 9 August: "The Bermondsey Horror": murder of Patrick O'Connor. On 13 November, the perpetrators are hanged together publicly by William Calcraft at Horsemonger Lane Gaol for the crime before a large crowd.
  - 12 October: 5 workmen are killed by toxic gases in a Pimlico sewer.
  - 17 December: The customer, probably Edward Coke, collects the first bowler hat, devised by the hatmakers Thomas and William Bowler, from the hatters James Lock & Co. of St James's.
  - Bedford College is founded by Elizabeth Jesser Reid as the 'Ladies College in Bedford Square', a non-sectarian higher education institution to provide a liberal female education.
  - Harrods moves to Knightsbridge, and Gatti's cafe in Holborn is in business.

== 1850 to 1859 ==
- 1850
  - 4 April: The North London Collegiate School for girls is established on new premises with Frances Buss as Principal.
  - 25 May: The hippopotamus Obaysch arrives at London Zoo from Egypt, making it the first to live in the British Isles since prehistoric times.
  - The London butchers C Lidgate opens for the first time.
- 1851
  - March: The Marble Arch is relocated to Hyde Park from the entrance to Buckingham Palace.
  - 1 May: The Great Exhibition opens in The Crystal Palace in Hyde Park.
  - 16 July: A Roman Catholic educational training college, the predecessor of St Mary's University, is established in Hammersmith.
  - October: The news agency Reuters is in business.
  - The Royal Marsden is established as the Free Cancer Hospital by the surgeon William Marsden, making it the world's first specialist cancer hospital.
  - A ticket office is erected at the Tower of London by Office of Works, making it the UK's first government-funded tourist infrastructure.
  - Hungerford Hall is built in Westminster.
  - Westminster College, a Methodist teacher training institution, is established.
  - Wandsworth Prison (Surrey House of Correction) admits its first inmates.
  - The Kensington Improvement Act provides for the management of garden squares in the borough.
  - Henry Mayhew's social survey London Labour and the London Poor, which began publication in The Morning Chronicle in 1849, is collected in book form.
- 1852
  - 3 February: The new chamber of the House of Commons of the United Kingdom in the Palace of Westminster, designed by Charles Barry and Augustus Pugin, opens.
  - 11 February: The first British public toilet for women opens on Bedford Street. One for gentlemen had opened on 2 February in Fleet Street.
  - 14 February: Great Ormond Street Hospital is opened as the UK's first children's hospital by the physician Charles West with only 10 beds. The hospital becomes one of the world leading centres for many specialist areas, with 423 beds across its various wards.
  - March: The Charles Dickens' novel Bleak House begins serialization.
  - May: The Museum of Manufactures, the predecessor of the Victoria and Albert Museum, initially opens in Marlborough House.
  - 17 May: Canterbury Music Hall, the first tavern music hall, is opened in Lambeth by the impresario Charles Morton.
  - 14 October: King's Cross railway station opens as the terminus of the Great Northern Railway.
  - 18 November: The funeral procession of the Duke of Wellington takes place from Horse Guards Parade to St Paul's Cathedral.
  - The Metropolis Water Act 1852 prohibits the extraction of drinking water from the Thames Tideway after 31 August 1855.
  - The publisher Taylor & Francis is in business.
- 1853
  - 20 January: The Photographic Society of London is founded.
  - May: The world's first public aquarium opens in Regent's Park.
  - Uriah Maggs establishes the antiquarian bookselling business that becomes Maggs Bros Ltd.
  - Edward Stanford sets up as a mapseller.
  - The Minchington Hall estate is merged into that of Arnos Grove.
- 1854
  - 16 January: The permanent Paddington station train shed, designed by Isambard Kingdom Brunel, opens for the Great Western Railway.
  - 18 March: Royal Panopticon opens.
  - April: 19-year-old Charles Spurgeon becomes preacher of the Baptist Metropolitan Tabernacle at the New Park Street Chapel.
  - 10 June: The Crystal Palace reopens in Sydenham with life-size dinosaur models in the grounds.
  - 31 August–8 September: An epidemic of cholera kills 10,000 people. Dr John Snow traces the source of the Broad Street cholera outbreak that kills 500 to a single water pump. This validates his theory that cholera is water-borne, which forms the starting point for epidemiology.
  - 13 November: London Necropolis Company, established by Act of Parliament on 30 June 1852, begins operating Brookwood Cemetery near Woking in Surrey with a connecting London Necropolis Railway service from its own station adjacent to Waterloo.
  - Kennington Park opens.
- 1855
  - March–June: Richard Wagner conducts a series of concerts in London.
  - 11 April: The first 6 post boxes begin to function in London.
  - April: Emperor of the French Napoleon III and Empress Eugénie stay at Buckingham Palace as part of a state visit to Britain.
  - By June: The Victoria Dock opens, making it the first in London designed to accommodate steamships.
  - June: The Metropolitan Cattle Market opens.
  - 24 June: Riot in Hyde Park over the Sunday Trading Bill.
  - 29 June: The Daily Telegraph newspaper begins publication.
  - 3 September: The last Bartholomew Fair takes place.
  - December: Charles Dickens' novel Little Dorrit begins serialisation.
  - 12 December: The Stepney Academy moves to Holford House as the Regent's Park College, a Baptist institution.
  - 14 December: The London and Middlesex Archaeological Society is established.
  - 17 December: The London General Omnibus Company is established in Paris as the Compagnie Générale des Omnibus de Londres; in the following year it absorbs a substantial proportion of the omnibus operators in London.
  - 22 December: The Metropolitan Board of Works is established.
  - The London School of Jewish Studies, a rabbinical seminary, opens as the Jews' College.
- 1856
  - 5 March: A fire destroys the Covent Garden Theatre.
  - 15 March: The Boat Race 1856 is the first of the annual series rowed between Cambridge and Oxford University Boat Clubs on the Thames in London.
  - 22 August: The Eastern Counties Railway opens its branch to Loughton; from 1947 this will be the oldest section of the London Underground.
  - 22 October: Big Ben is first given its nickname (by association with Benjamin Hall, 1st Baron Llanover) by the London Evening Standard.
  - 9 November: The last Lord Mayor's Show in which barges on the Thames are used takes place.
  - 13 November: Big Ben, as originally cast in Stockton-on-Tees, is first tested in Westminster.
  - 2 December: The National Portrait Gallery is formally established.
  - The Surrey Music Hall is built in the Royal Surrey Gardens.
- 1857
  - 2 May: The British Museum Reading Room opens.
  - 22 June: The South Kensington Museum is opened by the Queen. Although it is a predecessor of the Victoria and Albert Museum, it includes the collection of machinery that becomes the Science Museum. It is also the world's first museum to incorporate a refreshment room.
  - Peek Freans is established as biscuit manufacturers in Bermondsey.
- 1858
  - 1 January: The designation of London postal districts is completed.
  - 31 January: Isambard Kingdom Brunel's SS Great Eastern is launched in Millwall.
  - 25 March: St James's Hall opens as a concert venue.
  - 3 April: Chelsea Bridge, a toll iron suspension bridge over the Thames, opens to the public.
  - 10 April: Big Ben, the Great Bell for the Palace of Westminster's clock tower, is recast at the Whitechapel Bell Foundry. It is first tested there on 12 May and hoisted into position on 14 October.
  - 1 July: Papers by Charles Darwin and Alfred Russel Wallace announcing a theory of evolution by natural selection are read at the Linnean Society of London.
  - 2 July–August: Great Stink: Hot weather exacerbates the effects of untreated sewage discharged into the River Thames.
  - 17 July: The salvage of the Lutine bell takes place, and it is subsequently hung in Lloyd's of London.
  - 2 August: Metropolis Local Management Amendment Act passed as a result of the Great Stink to empower the Metropolitan Board of Works to construct Joseph Bazalgette's improved London sewer system.
  - 1 December: The recently formed Odontological Society of London opens the Dental Hospital of London.
  - 26 December: A panic and crush at the Royal Victoria Theatre in Waterloo kills 15 young men.
  - The Metropolitan Association for Improving the Dwellings of the Industrious Classes completes the Albert Cottages in Stepney.
  - Blackheath F.C. is founded, making it an early rugby football club.
- 1859
  - 15 January: The National Portrait Gallery opens.
  - 16 March: The Jewish Board of Guardians first meets in the East End.
  - 21 April: The first drinking fountain is erected by the Metropolitan Drinking Fountain and Cattle Trough Association.
  - 28 May: The church of All Saints, Margaret Street, designed by William Butterfield, is consecrated.
  - 7 September: The clock and chimes of the newly completed Clock Tower at the Palace of Westminster become fully operational. The great bell, which first chimed on 11 July, however, proves to be cracked and is silent until November 1863.
  - Red House, Bexleyheath, a key building in the Arts and Crafts Movement, is designed by its owner, William Morris, and the architect Philip Webb.
  - Wilton's Music Hall opens in the East End.
  - Approximate date: Rail service to the Great Northern Cemetery in New Southgate begins.

== 1860 to 1869 ==
- 1860
  - 28 February: The Artists Rifles is established as the 38th Middlesex (Artists) Rifle Volunteer Corps with headquarters at Burlington House.
  - 9 July: The Nightingale Training School and Home for Nurses, the first nursing school based on the ideas of Florence Nightingale, opens at St Thomas' Hospital.
  - 28 August: The Union of Benefices Act is passed to reduce the number of parish churches in the City and build new ones in the expanding suburbs. St Benet Gracechurch is the first to be demolished under this scheme in 1868.
  - 1 October: The first section of Victoria station opens for the London, Brighton & South Coast Railway, with trains using the Grosvenor Bridge across the Thames. The second section, for the London, Chatham and Dover Railway, opens some time later.
  - November: The 'Temporary Home for Lost and Starving Dogs', the predecessor of the Battersea Dogs and Cats Home, is established by Mary Tealby.
  - 29 December: The world's first ocean-going (all) iron-hulled and armoured battleship, HMS Warrior is launched on the Thames at Blackwall.
  - The first section of the London Underground begins construction on the site of Great Portland Street station.
  - Approximate date: Joseph Malin's is one of the first recorded fish and chip shops in London and the United Kingdom.
- 1861
  - 20 February: Storms damage the Crystal Palace.
  - 18 March: The Metropolitan Tabernacle is dedicated.
  - 23 March: The first of George Francis Train's demonstration horse-drawn trams in London begins operating on the Bayswater Road, but none of them last beyond the end of the year.
  - 26 March: The Oxford Music Hall is opened on Oxford Street by impresario Charles Morton.
  - April: Guards Crimean War Memorial unveiled in Waterloo Place, including sculptures of Other Ranks.
  - 22 June: The Tooley Street fire breaks out, and the firefighter James Braidwood is killed while fighting it.
  - 31 July: The church of St James the Less, Pimlico is consecrated.
  - 15 November: Teaching begins at the London Academy of Music and Dramatic Art, founded by conductor Henry Wylde initially at St James's Hall, it is the oldest specialist performing arts school in the British Isles.
  - The Stationers' Company's School is established.
  - The Royal Horticultural Society opens gardens and exhibition space in South Kensington, which close in 1882.
  - The Amateur Photographic Association is formed.
- 1862
  - 26 March: The Peabody Trust housing association is established by the London-based American banker George Peabody as the Peabody Donation Fund.
  - 1 May–1 November: The 1862 International Exhibition, or the "Great London Exposition", is held in South Kensington.
  - 24 May: The new Westminster Bridge, an iron arched bridge designed by Thomas Page, opens.
  - 10 November: The first Lambeth Bridge, a toll suspension bridge designed by Peter W. Barlow, opens.
  - c. November: Joseph Bazalgette begins the construction of the Thames Embankment.
  - The Royal Agricultural Hall opens in Islington.
  - The science collections of the South Kensington Museum move to separate buildings on Exhibition Road.
  - Derry & Toms is established as drapers on Kensington High Street.
  - Edward Stanford first publishes Stanford's Library Map of London and its suburbs.
- 1863
  - 10 January: The first section of the London Underground, the Metropolitan Railway between Paddington and Farringdon Street, opens to the public, operated by steam locomotives, making it the first in the world.
  - 2 March: Clapham Junction railway station opens.
  - March: American-born painter James McNeill Whistler settles close to the Thames in Chelsea, where he will live for most of the rest of his life.
  - 12 June: The Arts Club is founded by Charles Dickens, Anthony Trollope, Frederic Leighton and others in Mayfair as a social meeting place for those involved or interested in the creative arts.
  - 26 October: The Football Association is founded at the Freemasons' Tavern in Long Acre.
  - 19 December: The first game is played under the new Football Association rules at Mortlake between Ebenezer Morley's Barnes Club and Richmond F.C.; it ends in a goalless draw.
  - Alexandra Park opens in Haringey.
  - Siemens & Halske relocates from Millbank to the former Woolwich Dockyard area, where its submarine-cable factory becomes a major employer.
  - William Whiteley opens the drapery that becomes Whiteleys department store in Westbourne Grove and Curwen Press in business.
  - Lyon's Inn, one of the Inns of Chancery, is dissolved and demolished.
- 1864
  - 11 January: Charing Cross railway station and bridge are opened by the South Eastern Railway. The new Hungerford Bridge opens 1 May to pedestrians as part of Charing Cross Bridge, and the Strand Musick Hall opens in arches underneath the station.
  - April: Giuseppe Garibaldi visits London.
  - 13 June: The Hammersmith & City line opens.
  - 28 September: The International Workingmen's Association is founded in London.
  - 21 December: Blackfriars Railway Bridge is opened by the London, Chatham and Dover Railway.
  - The Aerated Bread Company opens the first A.B.C. tea shop in the forecourt of Fenchurch Street railway station.
  - The drapery business that will become the John Lewis department store chain is opened by John Lewis on Oxford Street.
- 1865
  - 7 February: The Pall Mall Gazette newspaper begins publication.
  - February: The restaurant that becomes the Café Royal is set up by expatriate French wine merchant Daniel Nicols near Piccadilly Circus.
  - 4 April: The Crossness Pumping Station, a major landmark in completion of the new London sewerage system designed by Joseph Bazalgette for the Metropolitan Board of Works, is officially opened. The construction of the complementary Abbey Mills Pumping Station begins and is completed in 1868.
  - 10 April: The new Hampton Court Bridge, built in iron, opens.
  - May: National outbreak of rinderpest in cattle first appears in Islington, leading to the abolition of urban cowkeeping by London dairies.
  - 1 June: Ludgate Hill railway station opens as a City terminus for passengers on the London, Chatham and Dover Railway.
  - 26 June: Jumbo, a young male African elephant, arrives at the London Zoo and becomes a popular attraction.
  - 2 July: The Christian Mission, later renamed The Salvation Army, is founded in Whitechapel by William and Catherine Booth.
  - 6 July: New building for Westminster Chapel opened by Congregationalists.
  - 28 September: Whitechapel-born Elizabeth Garrett Anderson becomes the first woman openly to qualify as a doctor in the UK, by licence from the Society of Apothecaries in London. By the end of the year, she establishes her own medical practice in the West End.
  - 31 October: Major explosion at London Gas Light Company Nine Elms works kills 11.
  - 1 November: Broad Street station opens as a City terminus for passengers on the North London Railway.
  - c. November: An Eleanor cross reproduction is erected in front of Charing Cross railway station.
- 1866
  - 1 January: The Metropolitan Fire Brigade is set up by the Metropolitan Fire Brigade Act 1865 under control of the Metropolitan Board of Works and under the leadership of Eyre Massey Shaw.
  - July: Elizabeth Garrett Anderson opens the St Mary's Dispensary in Bryanston Square, Marylebone, where women can seek medical advice from exclusively female practitioners.
  - 23–25 July: Demonstrations in Hyde Park in favour of parliamentary reform turn violent.
  - 15 August: Saint Joseph's Missionary Society of Mill Hill is founded.
  - 1 September: Cannon Street station is opened as a terminus by the South Eastern Railway.
  - The last cholera epidemic in London causes over 5,000 deaths.
  - John I. Thornycroft & Company is established as shipbuilders by John Isaac Thornycroft in Chiswick.
  - Harlequin F.C. is established as Hampstead Football Club to play rugby union; its first recorded game takes place in 1867.
- 1867
  - Early?: The Charing Cross Music Hall opens.
  - 5 January: A major fire destroys the original St John the Baptist's Church in Croydon.
  - 15 January: The Regent's Park skating disaster: 40 skaters are killed when ice breaks in Regent's Park.
  - By February: The Society of Arts inaugurates the blue plaque scheme, advanced by William Ewart, for erecting memorial tablets on London houses previously the homes of notable people. The first plaque is unveiled at Lord Byron's birthplace, 24 Holles Street, off Cavendish Square.
  - 20 May: Queen Victoria lays the foundation stone of the Royal Albert Hall.
  - October
    - Thomas Barnardo opens his first shelter for homeless children in Stepney.
    - The Hop and Malt Exchange opens in Southwark.
  - 13 December: Clerkenwell explosion ("Clerkenwell Outrage") at Clerkenwell Prison during a Fenian escape attempt; 12 local residents are killed.
  - Autumn/Winter: The Wasps Rugby Football Club is formed.
  - The rebuilding of Palace of Westminster is completed.
- 1868
  - 14 March: The Millwall Dock opens
  - 25 April: HMS Repulse, the last wooden battleship constructed for the Royal Navy, is launched as an ironclad at Woolwich Dockyard.
  - 26 May: The last public hanging in Britain, of the Fenian bomber Michael Barrett outside Newgate Prison for his part in the Clerkenwell explosion.
  - 1 October
    - St Pancras railway station train shed, designed by W. H. Barlow, opens for the Midland Railway. The construction of the permanent station buildings and Midland Grand Hotel, designed by George Gilbert Scott, has only just begun.
    - The Metropolitan Railway is extended from Paddington (Bishop's Road) station to Gloucester Road via Bayswater and Notting Hill Gate Underground stations.
  - 24 November: Smithfield Meat Market opens.
  - 8 December: The Echo newspaper begins publication.
  - 10 December: The world's first traffic lights are installed in Parliament Square.
  - 21 December: The new Gaiety Theatre opens.
  - 24 December: The first section of District line of the London Underground opens from South Kensington to Westminster as the District Railway.
  - The Royal Arsenal Co-operative Society is established as the Royal Arsenal Supply Association, a consumers' co-operative.
- 1869
  - 6 March: The first international cycle race is held in Crystal Palace.
  - 22 May: Sainsbury's first store opens, in Drury Lane.
  - 6 November: The new Blackfriars Bridge and Holborn Viaduct stations are opened by Queen Victoria.
  - 24 November: The Albert Embankment, engineered by Joseph Bazalgette, is completed.
  - 7 December: The first train runs through the Thames Tunnel on the East London Line as a link between the London, Brighton and South Coast Railway, the Great Eastern Railway and the South Eastern Railway.
  - Columbia Market is established in Bethnal Green as a covered food market by philanthropist Angela Burdett-Coutts.
  - The Royal Navy closes its Deptford and Woolwich Dockyards, and the Greenwich Hospital closes to naval in-pensioners

== 1870 to 1879 ==
- 1870
  - 16 April: The Vaudeville Theatre opens.
  - 2 May: The first permanent horse-drawn street trams in London run on the Brixton Road.
  - July: French painters Monet, Pissarro, Daubigny and the dealer Paul Durand-Ruel move to London to escape the Franco-Prussian War.
  - 13 July: Victoria Embankment, engineered by Joseph Bazalgette, opens.
  - 2 August: Official opening of the Tower Subway beneath the Thames takes place, making it the world's first underground passenger "tube" railway. Although this lasts as a railway operation only until November, it demonstrates the technologically successful first use of the cylindrical wrought iron tunnelling shield devised by Peter W. Barlow and James Henry Greathead.
  - 25 November: The Gas Light and Coke Company begins production from Beckton Gas Works, which becomes the largest in Europe.
  - Barkers of Kensington is established as drapers on Kensington High Street.
  - The Opera Comique opens in Westminster.
- 1871
  - 29 March: The Royal Albert Hall opens in South Kensington; it incorporates a grand organ by Henry Willis & Sons which is the world's largest at this time.
  - 24 April: Murder of servant girl Jane Clouson in Eltham.
  - Spring: James McNeill Whistler publishes Sixteen etchings of scenes on the Thames and paints his first "moonlights" (later called "nocturnes") of the river.
  - May: Beaver Hall is demolished and its estate is merged into that of Arnos Grove.
  - ca. May: French painter James Tissot flees Paris for London.
  - 14 June: Camille Pissarro marries his mistress Julie Vellay in Croydon and returns to France.
  - 18 July: The Slade School of Fine Art is established.
  - 15 September: The Army & Navy Co-operative Society Ltd is incorporated, origin of the Army & Navy Stores.
  - The Metropolitan Board of Works purchases its first portion of Hampstead Heath to preserve it from housing development.
  - The Maison Bertaux patisserie is founded in Soho.
  - Approximate date: Berners Club for Women is active.
- 1872
  - 16 March: In the first ever final of the FA Cup, the world's oldest Association football competition, the London club Wanderers F.C. defeat the Royal Engineers A.F.C. 1–0 at The Oval in Kennington.
  - 14 May: The new church of St Mary Abbots in Kensington, designed by Sir George Gilbert Scott, is consecrated.
  - 24 June: The Bethnal Green Museum opens in the East End.
  - 1 July: The Metropolitan Turnpike Trust is dissolved.
  - 3 July: Queen Victoria opens the Albert Memorial in memory of her husband Prince Albert.
  - 18 July: Philanthropist Angela Burdett-Coutts, 1st Baroness Burdett-Coutts, becomes the first woman to be made an Honorary Freeman of the City of London.
  - 3 August: The Artizans, Labourers & General Dwellings Company (a philanthropic organisation established in 1867) begins building cottages for social housing, the Shaftesbury Park Estate in Battersea (completed 1877).
  - 16 November: A London Metropolitan Police strike takes place.
- 1873
  - 16 January: The Royal Naval College, Greenwich is established using the former premises of Greenwich Hospital.
  - March: An American gang defrauds the Bank of England of £100,000.
  - 10 March: The new Guildhall Library building opens.
  - 5 May: The Midland Grand Hotel fronting St Pancras railway station is substantially completed and opened, making it the world's largest hotel at this time.
  - 18 May: Vincent van Gogh begins an 18-month spell living in London (Brixton) and working for an art dealer in Southampton Street.
  - 9 June: Alexandra Palace is destroyed by fire only a fortnight after its opening.
  - 23 August: The Albert Bridge opens.
  - 27 September: The first Wandsworth Bridge opens.
  - 17 November: The Criterion Restaurant opens in Piccadilly.
  - December: Several weeks of severe smog.
  - Butler's Wharf warehouses are completed.
  - Work begins on the Natural History Museum.
- 1874
  - 2 February: Liverpool Street station opens as the City terminus of the Great Eastern Railway.
  - 2 March: Holborn Viaduct station opens as a City terminus of the London, Chatham and Dover Railway.
  - 9 May: The Chelsea Embankment opens.
  - 2 October: A barge carrying petroleum and gunpowder on the Regent's Canal explodes under the Macclesfield bridge at Regent's Park, and 4 people are killed.
  - October: Northumberland House at Charing Cross is purchased by the Metropolitan Board of Works to clear the site for construction of Northumberland Avenue, which is completed by 1876.
  - Autumn: London School of Medicine for Women founded.
  - The construction of HM Prison Wormwood Scrubs begins; it is completed by prisoners.
  - The College for Working Women is established.
  - The Kirkaldy Testing and Experimenting Works in Southwark opens.
- 1875
  - February: First shelter is installed by the Cabmen's Shelter Fund in St John's Wood.
  - March: Frederick Hunt murders his wife and children in Penge.
  - 2 August: The Belgravia Roller Skating Rink opens.
  - September: Joseph Bazalgette completes the 30-year construction of London's sewer system.
  - Arthur Liberty sets up the Liberty business on Regent Street.
  - The Society for Photographing Relics of Old London is established.
- 1876
  - 21 April: Charles Bravo is poisoned at his home, The Priory, Balham, but there is no criminal indictment in the case.
  - 16 May: The German American "Napoleon of crime" Adam Worth steals Gainsborough's Portrait of Georgiana, Duchess of Devonshire from Agnew's gallery in Old Bond Street 3 weeks after its sale at Christie's for 10,000 guineas, making it the highest price ever paid for a painting at auction at this time.
  - 7 October: The first greyhound race to use an artificial hare is held in Hendon.
  - November: Hampstead Cemetery opens.
- 1877
  - 10 April: The first human cannonball act in the British Isles, and perhaps the world, is performed by 14-year-old Rossa Matilda Richter ("Zazel") at the Royal Aquarium.
  - 13 April: Murder of Harriet Staunton in Penge.
  - 1 May: Grosvenor Gallery opens to the public for the display of contemporary art.
  - 24 March: The Boat Race ends in a dead heat between Oxford and Cambridge for the only time in its history.
  - 9–19 July: The All England Lawn Tennis and Croquet Club stages the first Wimbledon Championships in lawn tennis. Wimbledon-born cricketer Spencer Gore becomes first Wimbledon gentlemen's singles champion (the only event held; the final is delayed by rain).
  - 20 July: The new Billingsgate Fish Market building opens.
  - Richard Norman Shaw is appointed as the architect to Bedford Park, which was laid out in 1875.
  - The Peter Jones drapery store moves to the King's Road.
- 1878
  - 2–13 January: Wren's Temple Bar is dismantled and re-erected at Theobalds Park in Hertfordshire. In 1880, a monument is erected on its original site marking the entrance to the city.
  - 24 February: Anti-Russian demonstrations in Hyde Park.
  - 5 March: William Burges moves into The Tower House, which he has designed for himself in the Holland Park district.
  - 25 May: Gilbert and Sullivan's comic opera HMS Pinafore opens at the Opera Comique on the Strand with a first run of 571 performances.
  - July: The American-born painter James McNeill Whistler moves into the White House, designed by E. W. Godwin in Tite Street, Chelsea. Also this year, Oscar Wilde moves (initially) into No. 1 in the same street by the same architect.
  - 8 August: The Epping Forest Act requires it to be preserved for public recreation in the care of the Corporation of London.
  - August: The Gaiety Theatre becomes the first in London to light its stage with carbon arc lamps.
  - 3 September: Over 640 people die when the crowded pleasure boat Princess Alice collides with the collier Bywell Castle in the Thames off Woolwich.
  - 12 September: Cleopatra's Needle is erected on the Victoria Embankment.
  - October
    - The University of London becomes the first in the UK to admit women on equal terms with men.
    - William Morris moves into Kelmscott House on the Thames waterfront at Hammersmith.
  - 13 December: Electric street lighting is initially introduced in London on the Thames Embankment (using Yablochkov candles, a form of arc lamp first demonstrated in London in 1876), followed by Waterloo Bridge following illumination of the new Billingsgate Fish Market from 29 November.
  - Gamages opens.
  - The Leather, Hide and Wool Exchange is built in Bermondsey.
  - Surrey County Gaol in Southwark is closed.
  - St John's Wood Art School and the Sette of Odd Volumes (club) are founded.
- 1879
  - 2 March: The Murder of Julia Martha Thomas takes place in Richmond.
  - 24 May: The Metropolitan Board of Works frees Albert, Chelsea, Vauxhall and Lambeth Bridges of tolls.
  - 1 August: The D'Oyly Carte Opera Company is established.
  - 16 August: Fulham F.C. is founded as the Fulham St Andrew's Church Sunday School football club.
  - Between November and March 1880, probably the longest ever fog in its history engulfs London.
  - The first telephone exchange opens in London.
  - Prudential Assurance moves to its new headquarters at Holborn Bars.
  - Welsh draper D H Evans opens his shop at 320 Oxford Street.

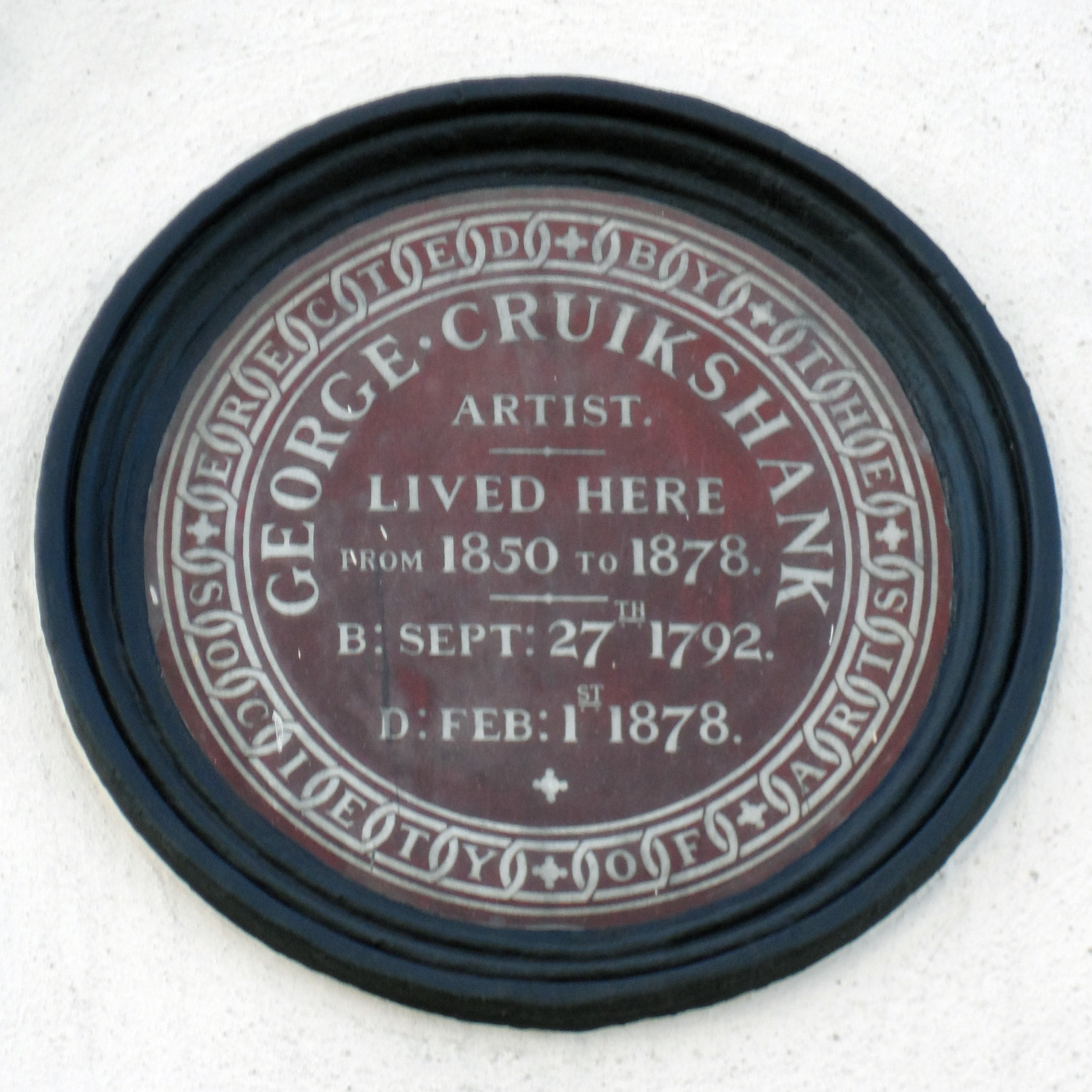
Commemorative plaque erected by the Society of Arts to caricaturist George Cruikshank in Camden (1885).

== 1880 to 1889 ==
- 1880
  - 17 April: Richard Norman Shaw's masterpiece, the Church of St Michael and All Angels, Bedford Park, is consecrated.
  - 31 May: The St James's Gazette newspaper begins publication.
  - 24 June: The Royal Albert Dock opens.
  - Summer: Burnham Beeches in Buckinghamshire is purchased by the Corporation of London to preserve the woodlands for public recreation.
  - 27 September: The Guildhall School of Music opens.
  - 28 October: The London Topographical Society is founded as the Topographical Society of London.
  - 17 November: The University of London awards the first degrees to women.
  - The Old Vic theatre is taken over by Emma Cons as the Royal Victoria Hall and coffee tavern.
  - Henry Croft is dressing as a pearly king by this date.
- 1881
  - 16 March: Fenian dynamite campaign: A bomb is found and defused in the Mansion House.
  - 3 April: The United Kingdom Census 1881 takes place. London's population is 50,569 in the City, 3,779,728 in the county, and 4,766,661 in Greater London. 1/8 of the UK's population now live in London.
  - 18 April: The Natural History Museum opens in South Kensington.
  - 14–20 July: The International Anarchist Congress is held in London.
  - 26 July: The Evening News is first published.
  - 10 October: Richard D'Oyly Carte's Savoy Theatre opens, making it the world's first public building to be fully lit by electricity using Joseph Swan's incandescent light bulbs. The run of Gilbert and Sullivan's new satirical opera Patience transfers from the Opera Comique. The stage is first lit electrically on 28 December.
  - 15 December: The rebuilt Leadenhall Market opens.
  - "Great Paul", Britain's heaviest swinging bell, is hung in the south-west tower of St Paul's Cathedral.
  - The London Municipal Reform League is founded.
  - Leyton Orient F.C. is formed as the football team of the Glyn Cricket Club.
- 1882
  - 12 January: Holborn Viaduct power station in the city, the world's first coal-fired public electricity generating station, begins operation to supply street lighting and some premises.
  - 25 January: The London Chamber of Commerce is founded.
  - 24 March: Jumbo the elephant departs from Britain having been sold by London Zoo to the American showman P. T. Barnum.
  - 12 May: Fenian dynamite campaign: A bomb explodes at the Mansion House.
  - 5 September: Tottenham Hotspur F.C. is founded as Hotspur F.C. by schoolboys with Bobby Buckle as first captain.
  - 25 September: The Young Men's Christian Institute, the former Royal Polytechnic Institute and a predecessor of the University of Westminster, opens in new premises in Regent Street provided by Quintin Hogg.
  - 2 October: Westfield College, a constituent college of the University of London, opens in Hampstead for the education of women.
  - 22 October: The London Press Club is established.
  - 25 November: The Gilbert and Sullivan comic opera Iolanthe is first produced at the Savoy Theatre.
  - 4 December: The Royal Courts of Justice opens on the Strand in Westminster.
  - The Christchurch Rangers, the earliest predecessor of Queens Park Rangers F.C., is founded.
  - The London and Provincial Photographic Association is established.
- 1883
  - 20 January: Fenian dynamite campaign: An explosion at the Local Government Board, Charles Street, Mayfair (Westminster) causes over £4,000 worth of damage and some minor injuries to people nearby. A 2nd bomb at The Times newspaper offices in Queen Victoria Street does not explode.
  - 17 March: Karl Marx is buried at Highgate Cemetery.
  - 7 May: The Royal College of Music opens with George Grove as its first director.
  - 4 August: The Noel Park estate of the Artizans, Labourers & General Dwellings Company is formally opened.
  - 30 October: Fenian dynamite campaign: Two Clan na Gael dynamite bombs explode in the London Underground, at Paddington (Praed Street) station, which injures 70 people, and Westminster Bridge station.
- 1884
  - January: The London Hydraulic Power Company is set up by Act to merge the Wharves & Warehouses Steam Power and Hydraulic Pressure Co. (1871) and the General Hydraulic Power Company (1882).
  - 4 January: The Fabian Society is founded on Osnaburgh Street.
  - 26 February: Fenian dynamite campaign: A bomb explodes in the left-luggage office at Victoria station. Other bombs are defused at Charing Cross station, Ludgate Hill station and Paddington station.
  - 16 April: The permanent Brompton Oratory is consecrated.
  - 17 April: The Empire Theatre opens.
  - 30 May: Fenian dynamite campaign: Three bombs explode in London: at the headquarters of the Criminal Investigation Department and the Metropolitan Police Service's Special Irish Branch, in the basement of the Carlton Club (a gentlemen's club frequented by members of the Conservative Party), and outside the home of Conservative MP Sir Watkin Williams-Wynn. 10 people are injured, and a 4th bomb planted at the foot of Nelson's Column fails to explode.
  - 4 June: The East London Aquarium in Spitalfields is destroyed by fire with numerous animals killed.
  - 8 July: The NSPCC is founded as the London Society for the Prevention of Cruelty to Children.
  - 6 October: The Circle line (London Underground) is completed.
  - 22 October: The International Meridian Conference in Washington, D.C. fixes the Greenwich meridian as the world's prime meridian.
  - 13 December: Fenian dynamite campaign: London Bridge attack.
  - Samuel and Henrietta Barnett establish and begin living at the first university settlement with Raymond Unwin in Toynbee Hall, in the East End.
  - St Columba's Church, part of the Church of Scotland, is built in Knightsbridge.
  - A swimming pool opens in Dartmouth Road in Forest Hill.
  - The Society of Architects is formed.
- 1885
  - 2 January: Fenian dynamite campaign: A bomb explodes at Gower Street Tube station.
  - 10 January: The Japanese Village, Knightsbridge, exhibition opens.
  - 24 January: Fenian dynamite campaign: Irish terrorists damage Westminster Hall and the Tower of London.
  - 14 March: The première of Gilbert and Sullivan's comic opera The Mikado takes place at the Savoy Theatre.
  - 6–9 July: Eliza Armstrong case: Campaigning journalist W. T. Stead publishes a series of articles in the Pall Mall Gazette entitled The Maiden Tribute of Modern Babylon exposing the extent of female child prostitution in London.
  - 3 October: Millwall F.C., formed by the workers of J. T. Morton's canning factory on the Isle of Dogs as Millwall Rovers, play their first match.
  - An electrical power station is installed at Grosvenor Gallery for public supply.
  - The first municipal underground public toilet opens in the city for gentlemen (probable date).
  - The first modern pedestal flush toilet is demonstrated by Frederick Humpherson of the Beaufort Works in Chelsea.
  - The Ayrton Light is first illuminated on the Palace of Westminster's clock tower to show that Parliament is sitting.
  - The Science Collections of the South Kensington Museum are renamed as the Science Museum.
  - Guildhall Art Gallery and Huguenot Society of London established.
- 1886
  - 18 January: The Hockey Association is founded, largely on the initiative of sports clubs in the London area, and codifies the rules for hockey.
  - 8 February ("Black Monday"): The "Pall Mall riots" take place, the climax of 2 days of rioting in the West End and Trafalgar Square by the unemployed, coinciding with the coldest winter in 30 years. John Burns encourages the demonstrators.
  - 10 March: The first Crufts dog show is held.
  - 10 May: The London, Chatham and Dover Railway duplicates Blackfriars Railway Bridge by the construction of the parallel St Paul's Railway Bridge to serve a new terminus north of the Thames, St Paul's. This is renamed Blackfriars station in 1937.
  - 19 May: Highgate Wood is purchased by the Corporation of London to preserve it for public recreation.
  - 29 May: The replacement stone Putney Bridge opens over the Thames.
  - 20 July: Sayes Court Park opens to the public.
  - 11 December: Arsenal F.C., formed as Dial Square by mostly Scottish workers at the Royal Arsenal in Woolwich, play their first match on the Isle of Dogs. The club is renamed Royal Arsenal soon afterwards, supposedly on 25 December.
  - 25 December: There is a great snow storm in London.
  - 26 December: The Olympia exhibition centre opens as the National Agricultural Hall.
  - Queens Park Rangers F.C. is formed by merger of existing clubs in north-west London.
  - Shaftesbury Avenue is completed.
  - The last inmates of Millbank Prison leave
- 1887
  - 18 January: A panic and crush at the Hebrew Dramatic Club in the East End leads to 17 deaths.
  - April–May: The First Colonial Conference is held at the Colonial Office.
  - 9 May: The first exhibition at Earl's Court, an American Exhibition & Buffalo Bill's Wild West Show, opens.
  - 11 May – First female victim of the Thames Torso Murders found.
  - 14 May: The People's Palace, a predecessor of Queen Mary University of London, is opened in the East End by Queen Victoria.
  - 11 June: Replacement Hammersmith Bridge, a suspension bridge over the Thames, opens.
  - 6/7 August: A 4th major fire devastates Whiteleys department store in Bayswater.
  - 13 November ("Bloody Sunday"): A large socialist demonstration addressed by respectable speakers is violently broken up by the police. Then, at a 20 November demonstration against police brutality, a bystander is killed.
  - November: Arthur Conan Doyle's first detective novel, A Study in Scarlet, is published in Beeton's Christmas Annual by Ward Lock & Co. in London. This introduces the London consulting detective Sherlock Holmes and his friend and chronicler Dr. Watson.
  - The Earl's Court site is first used as a showground.
  - Clissold Park in Hackney is purchased by the Metropolitan Board of Works to be opened as a public park.
  - The London Social Camera Club is established.
- 1888
  - 18 January: The first issue of The Star evening newspaper goes on sale; it will cover this year's Whitechapel murders intensively.
  - 13 February: The first issue of the Financial Times goes on sale; it was launched on 9 January by Horatio Bottomley as the London Financial Guide.
  - 23 March: A meeting called by William McGregor to discuss establishment of The Football League is held in London.
  - 3 April: The prostitute Emma Elizabeth Smith is brutally attacked by 2 or 3 men, dying of her injuries the following day. This is the first of the Whitechapel murders, but she is probably not a victim of Jack the Ripper.
  - 26 May: Punch magazine begins serialisation of George and Weedon Grossmith's humorous The Diary of a Nobody, the first entry being for "April 3".
  - 11 July: Snow (or at least a heavy frost) in parts of London early this morning.
  - 2–27 July: London matchgirls strike of 1888: Around 200 workers, mainly teenaged girls, strike following the dismissal of 3 colleagues from the Bryant and May match factory. This is precipitated by an article on their working conditions published on 23 June by the campaigning journalist Annie Besant, and the workers unionise on 27 July.
  - 7 August: Whitechapel murders: The body of prostitute Martha Tabram is found, making her a possible victim of Jack the Ripper.
  - 13 August: The Local Government Act, effective from 1889, establishes the County of London.
  - 31 August: Whitechapel murders: The mutilated body of prostitute Mary Ann Nichols is found in Buck's Row. She is perhaps the first victim of Jack the Ripper.
  - September: Woolwich Market is officially established on Beresford Square.
  - 8 September: Whitechapel murders: The mutilated body of prostitute Annie Chapman is found. She is considered to be the second victim of Jack the Ripper. On 27 September, the 'Dear Boss letter' signed "Jack the Ripper" (the first time the name is used) is received by the Central News Agency. On 30 September, the bodies of the prostitutes Elizabeth Stride and Catherine Eddowes, the latter mutilated, are found, and they are generally considered Jack the Ripper's third and fourth victim respectively.
  - 2 October: Whitehall Mystery (one of the Thames Torso Murders): The dismembered remains of a woman's body are discovered at three central London locations, one being the construction site of New Scotland Yard.
  - 3 October: Gilbert and Sullivan's Savoy opera The Yeomen of the Guard premieres at the Savoy Theatre.
  - 9 November: Whitechapel murders: The mutilated body of the prostitute Mary Jane Kelly is found; she is considered to be the fifth and last of Jack the Ripper's victims. A number of similar murders in England follows, but the police attribute them to copy-cat killers.
  - 17 December: The Lyric Theatre opens in the West End.
  - Parliament Hill is purchased by the Metropolitan Board of Works to preserve it as a public viewpoint.
  - The first police boxes are erected in London.
  - St Dunstan's College is refounded in Catford.
  - The Eagle Cricket Club is renamed Orient Football Club.
- 1889
  - 23 March: The Woolwich Free Ferry is inaugurated.
  - 1 April: The elected London County Council takes up its powers in succession to the Metropolitan Board of Works. The Progressive Party have a majority, with Lord Rosebery as the first chairman. The boroughs of Lambeth, Southwark, Wandsworth and parts of Lewisham and the Penge area of Bromley, previously in the county of Surrey, become part of London and Croydon becomes a county borough. Metropolitan Middlesex, about 20% of the area and containing 33% of its population, is also transferred to London and the remainder becomes an administrative county governed by the Middlesex County Council meeting at Middlesex Guildhall in Westminster. East Barnet Valley Urban District, previously partly in Middlesex, is transferred to Hertfordshire. The Liberty of the Clink is also abolished.
  - 24 April: The Garrick Theatre opens.
  - 6 July: Several aristocrats are implicated in the Cleveland Street scandal after police raid a male brothel.
  - 6 August: The Savoy Hotel opens.
  - 14 August–15 September: London Dock Strike of 1889: Dockers strike for a minimum wage of sixpence an hour ("The dockers' tanner"). They eventually receive this, making this a landmark in the development of New Unionism.
  - 30 August: The Royal Mail Mount Pleasant Sorting Office is officially opened.
  - 7 September: The Morley Memorial College for Working Men and Women opens in south London.
  - 10 September – Last (possible) female victim of the Thames Torso Murders found.
  - Charles Booth's Life and Labour of the People in London begins publication.
  - Chenies Street Chambers Ladies Residential Dwellings open in Bloomsbury as a partly co-operative residential apartments for single women.

== 1890 to 1899 ==
- 1890
  - 21 July: The replacement Battersea Bridge over the Thames opens.
  - 10 October: Brentford F.C. is established by members of Brentford Rowing Club.
  - 24 October: "Hampstead Tragedy": Mary Pearcey brutally murders her lover's wife and child, for which she will be hanged on 23 December.
  - November: Scotland Yard, headquarters of the Metropolitan Police Service, moves to a building on the Victoria Embankment as New Scotland Yard.
  - 4 November: The City & South London Railway, the first deep-level electric underground railway in the world, opens as the predecessor of the Northern line. It runs a distance of 5.1 km (3.2 mi) between the City of London and Stockwell.
  - December: No hours of sunshine are recorded this month in Westminster.
  - The Blackwall Buildings, Whitechapel, noted philanthropic housing, is built in the East End.
  - The construction of Britain's first council housing at Arnold Cross, Shoreditch begins in the East End.
  - Pearson move their building contractor's business to London.
  - The Rhymers' Club, a group of poets, begins to meet informally at the Cheshire Cheese on Fleet Street.
- 1890–1 – Construction of the first large-scale electrical power station in Deptford begins, and from mid-1891, the first Bankside Power Station begins operation.
- 1891
  - January: The Strand Magazine is first published. On 25 June (issue dated July), Arthur Conan Doyle's fictional London private consulting detective Sherlock Holmes appears in it for the first time in the story "A Scandal in Bohemia".
  - 7 April: George Gissing's novel New Grub Street is published.
  - May: William Morris establishes the Kelmscott Press in Hammersmith.
  - November: Woolwich Polytechnic opens in the Bathway Quarter in Woolwich, a predecessor of the University of Greenwich.
  - 26 December–January 1893: The Venice in London spectacular takes place in Olympia.
- 1892
  - 1 July: The Royal Liberty of Havering is dissolved.
  - 15 July: The Bibliographical Society is established.
  - 30 September: Borough Polytechnic Institute, a predecessor of London South Bank University, opens. Also this year, West Ham Technical Institute, a predecessor of the University of East London, is founded.
  - 15 November: Thomas Neill Cream, the "Lambeth Poisoner", is hanged in Newgate Prison.
  - 23 November: The London Chamber of Arbitration is instituted.
  - December: Smog kills 779.
  - Rosebery Avenue is completed.
- 1893
  - 29 June: The Shaftesbury Memorial Fountain, designed by Alfred Gilbert, is unveiled with its statue of Anteros on Piccadilly Circus.
  - 25 November: Queen's Hall opens as a concert venue in Langham Place.
  - A director for the Science Museum is appointed.
- 1894
  - 15 February: At 04:51 GMT, French anarchist Martial Bourdin attempts to destroy the Royal Greenwich Observatory with a bomb.
  - 19 May: Richmond Lock and Footbridge opens on the Thames.
  - 30 June: Tower Bridge opens to traffic.
  - 20 September: The first Lyons tea shop opens in Piccadilly.
  - 18 October: The Kinetoscope Parlour, the first in the UK, is opened to the public in Oxford Street.
  - 29 September: The Royal Commission on the Amalgamation of the City and County of London report issued.
  - December: Frederick Bremer, a plumber and gasfitter from Walthamstow, runs the first British 4-wheeled, petrol-engined, motor car (self-built in 1892) on the public highway.
  - Alfred Harmsworth buys the London Evening News newspaper.
  - The City of London School for Girls is established.
  - The Survey of London project begins as the Survey of the Memorials of Greater London, established by C. R. Ashbee; it is taken over by the London County Council in 1897.
  - The London Camanachd sport club is formed.
- 1895
  - 1 January: The Bishopsgate Institute opens.
  - 1 February: Gas explosion on Southwark Bridge.
  - 14 February: Première of Oscar Wilde's last play, the comedy The Importance of Being Earnest, at St. James' Theatre.
  - 18 February: The Marquess of Queensberry, father of Oscar Wilde's lover Lord Alfred Douglas, leaves his calling card at the Albemarle Club, inscribed: "For Oscar Wilde, posing somdomite", i.e. a sodomite, inducing Wilde to charge him with criminal libel.
  - March: Birt Acres films Incident at Clovelly Cottage in Chipping Barnet, the "first successful motion picture film made in Britain".
  - 3–5 April: The libel case of Wilde v Queensberry takes place at the Old Bailey, where Queensberry, defended by Edward Carson, is acquitted. However, evidence of Wilde's homosexual relationships with young men in London renders him liable to criminal prosecution under the Labouchere Amendment and he is arrested at the Cadogan Hotel in Knightsbridge on 6 April for "unlawfully committing acts of gross indecency with certain male persons" and detained on remand in Holloway Prison. On 25 May, the criminal case of Regina v. Wilde takes place, in which, after a retrial at the Old Bailey, Oscar Wilde is convicted of gross indecency and is taken to Pentonville Prison to begin his 2 years' sentence of hard labour.
  - 29 June: The formation of Thames Ironworks F.C. by workers at the Thames Ironworks and Shipbuilding Company in Canning Town, the predecessor of West Ham United F.C., is announced.
  - 17 July: The Great Wheel opens at the Earl's Court exhibition grounds; at 94 m (300 ft), it is the world's tallest Ferris wheel at this date. It is last used in October 1906 and demolished in 1907.
  - 20 July: The rebuilt Lyric Theatre (Hammersmith) opens.
  - 10 August: The first ever indoor promenade concert, origin of The Proms, is held at the Queen's Hall, Langham Place, opening a series promoted by the impresario Robert Newman with 26-year-old Henry Wood as sole conductor.
  - 25 September: Snow falls in London.
  - 10 October: The London School of Economics holds its first classes.
  - November: The Lee–Enfield rifle, produced at the Royal Small Arms Factory in Enfield, is adopted as standard issue by the British Army, remaining in service until the 1960s.
  - The Agapemonites complete the Ark of the Covenant church in Upper Clapton.
- 1896
  - 10 January: Birt Acres demonstrates his film projector, the Kineopticon, the first in Britain, to the Lyonsdown Photographic Club in New Barnet, making it the first film show to an audience in the UK. On 14 January, he demonstrates it to the Royal Photographic Society at the Queen's Hall.
  - 20 February:
    - Robert W. Paul demonstrates his film projector, the Theatrograph (later known as the Animatograph) at the Alhambra Theatre.
    - The Lumiere Brothers first project their films in Britain at the Empire Theatre of Varieties, Leicester Square.
  - 21 March: The Kineopticon is opened on Piccadilly Circus/Shaftesbury Avenue corner, but is destroyed by fire after a few weeks.
  - May: "Watkin's Tower" at Wembley Park opens to the public. However, it is never completed beyond its first stage and is demolished by 1907. Wembley Stadium (1923) is eventually built on the site.
  - 4 May: The Daily Mail newspaper begins publication.
  - 19 May: The Croydon Town Hall complex opens.
  - July: Robert W. Paul shoots the first actuality film of a London street scene at Blackfriars Bridge, which is first screened the following month.
  - 26 July–1 August: The International Socialist Workers and Trade Union Congress is held in London.
  - 17 August: Bridget Driscoll becomes the first person in the world to be killed in a car accident, in the grounds of The Crystal Palace.
  - 1 October: The Trocadero restaurant of J. Lyons and Co. opens.
  - November: Arthur Morrison's social realist novella A Child of the Jago is published.
  - The first flats in the London County Council's Boundary Estate in the East End, the country's earliest public housing scheme, are completed, replacing part of the notorious Old Nichol slum.
  - The estate agents Knight, Frank & Rutley are established.
- 1897
  - 22 May: The Blackwall Tunnel opens for road traffic beneath the Thames in the East End; it is the world's longest subaqueous tunnel at this time.
  - 22 June: Queen Victoria's Diamond Jubilee celebrations take place.
  - 21 July: The National Gallery of British Art (modern-day Tate Britain) opens on Millbank.
  - 10 August: The Automobile Club of Great Britain (modern-day Royal Automobile Club) is founded in London.
  - 19 August: Bersey electric cabs, the first horseless taxicabs, begin operating in London.
  - 19 November: Great fire in Cripplegate.
- 1898
  - 21 June: At the launch of HMS Albion from the Thames Ironworks and Shipbuilding Company in Blackwell, 34 spectators drown when a stage collapses.
  - 19 July: French novelist Émile Zola arrives in London to escape imprisonment for criminal libel over his open letter J'Accuse…! on the Dreyfus affair.
  - 8 August: The Waterloo & City line, a physically isolated Tube line operated by the London & South Western Railway, opens to the public.
  - 16 November: Harrods department store in Knightsbridge install the first stepless escalator in the UK.
  - Lilian Baylis takes over management of The Old Vic theatre.
  - Orient Football Club is renamed as Clapton Orient.
- 1899
  - 25 February: In an accident at Grove Hill, Harrow, Edwin Sewell becomes the world's first driver of a petrol-driven vehicle to be killed, and his passenger, Maj. James Richer, dies of injuries 3 days later.
  - 15 March: Marylebone station, the last mainline London terminus, is opened by the Great Central Railway.
  - 17 May: The foundation stone of the Victoria and Albert Museum is laid by Queen Victoria, making this her last public engagement.
  - 24 May: The Kensington Palace state rooms are opened to the public by the Office of Works.
  - 13 July: London Government Act 1899 divides the County of London into 28 metropolitan boroughs with effect from 1 November 1900: Battersea, Bermondsey, Bethnal Green, Camberwell, Chelsea, Deptford, Finsbury, Fulham, Greenwich, Hammersmith, Hackney, Hampstead, Holborn, Islington, Kensington, Lambeth, Lewisham, Paddington, Poplar, St Marylebone, St Pancras, Shoreditch, Southwark, Stepney, Stoke Newington, Wandsworth, Westminster, and Woolwich (including North Woolwich).
  - September–October: Monet makes the first of 3 visits to London in consecutive years, where he paints views over the Thames from the Savoy Hotel.
  - 9 October: The Motor Traction Company introduces the first motor buses in regular London service between Kennington and Victoria station.
  - 27 October: Louise Masset, an unmarried mother, murders her 3-year-old son in a cloakroom at Dalston Junction railway station. She will be found guilty on 18 December and hanged at Newgate Prison on 9 January 1900.
  - 31 October: The statue of Oliver Cromwell, Westminster, is unveiled outside the House of Commons.
  - 16 November: Wyndham's Theatre opens on Charing Cross Road.

== See also ==
- Timeline of London
- History of London

== Bibliography ==
See also lists of works about London by period: Tudor London, Stuart London, 18th century, 19th century, 1900–1939, 1960s

published in the 19th century

- Elmes, James (1831). Topographical Dictionary of London and Its Environs. London: Whittaker, Treacher and Arnot.
- Allen, Thomas; Wright, Thomas (1839). "Account of the Companies of the City of London, Alphabetically Arranged". History and Antiquities of London, Westminster, Southwark, and Parts Adjacent. Vol. 2. London. pp. 376–429. hdl:2027/hvd.hwh1uq.
- "London". Penny Cyclopaedia. Vol. 14. London: Charles Knight. 1839. pp. 109–129. hdl:2027/ucm.5319406728.
- Knight, Charles, ed. (1844), "Metropolitan Boroughs", London, vol. 6, London: C. Knight & Co.
- Cunningham, Peter (1850), "Chronology of London Occurrences", Handbook of London (2nd ed.), London: John Murray, OCLC 4773921
- J. Willoughby Rosse (1859). "London". Index of Dates ... Facts in the Chronology and History of the World. Bohn's reference library. London: H.G. Bohn. hdl:2027/hvd.32044098621048 – via HathiTrust.
- Timbs, John (1866), Club Life of London, London: J. Bentley, OL 7098926M
- Townsend, George Henry (1867), "London", A Manual of Dates (2nd ed.), London: Frederick Warne & Co., pp. 587–590
- Overall, William Henry (1870), "London", Dictionary of Chronology, London: William Tegg, OCLC 2613202
- Dickens, Charles (1882), "Historical Events", Dickens's Dictionary of London, London: Macmillan & Co.
- Maxwell, John and Robert (1885). "Memorable Dates". Concise Guide to London. London. circa 1882
- Price-Williams, R. (1885), "Population of London, 1801–81", Journal of the Statistical Society, vol. 48, pp. 349–432, hdl:2027/uc1.b4148209
- Mrs. Basil Holmes (1896). "Burial-Grounds within the Metropolitan Area". London Burial Grounds. Macmillan.

published in the 20th century

- Henry Barton Baker (1904), "Chronological List of the London Theatres", History of the London Stage and its Famous Players (1576–1903), London: Routledge
- Robert Donald, ed. (1907). "London". Municipal Year Book of the United Kingdom for 1907. London: Edward Lloyd. pp. 5–47.
- Howarth, Osbert John Radcliffe; Ingram, Thomas Allan; Wheatley, Henry Benjamin (1910). "London" . In Chisholm, Hugh (ed.). Encyclopædia Britannica. Vol. 16 (11th ed.). Cambridge University Press. pp. 938–968, see pages (1) 945 & (2) 951. "(1) IV. Population, Public Health, &c. & (2) VII. Government"
- Miltoun, Francis (1908). "Brief Chronology". Dickens' London. Boston: L.C. Page & Company.
- Vincent, Benjamin (1910), "London", Haydn's Dictionary of Dates (25th ed.), London: Ward, Lock & Co., pp. 839–848
- Godfrey, Walter H. (1911), "List of Buildings on ... Map 1: The City of London and Southwark", History of Architecture in London, London: B.T. Batsford
- Cook's Handbook to London. London: Thos. Cook & Son. 1921.
- Rudé, George F.E. (1971). Hanoverian London, 1714–1808. History of London. University of California Press. ISBN 978-0-520-01778-8.
- Nicholson, Louise (1998). "London Chronology". London. Abbeville Press. ISBN 978-0-7112-1187-2.

published in the 21st century

- Richardson, John (2000). The Annals of London: A Year-by-year Record of a Thousand Years of History. University of California Press. ISBN 978-0-520-22795-8.
- Schwarz, Leonard (2000). "London, 1700–1840". In Peter Clark (ed.). Cambridge Urban History of Britain. Vol. 2. Cambridge University Press. p. 641+. ISBN 978-0-521-43141-5.
- Ackroyd, Peter (2001), "Chronology", London: the Biography, Nan A. Talese, ISBN 9780385497701
- Rappaport, Erika Diane (2001). Shopping for Pleasure: Women in the Making of London's West End. Princeton University Press. ISBN 0-691-04476-7.
- Wilson, A.N. (2004). "Chronology of London History". London: A History. Modern Library. p. 193+. ISBN 978-0-307-42665-9.
- Weinreb, Ben; et al. (2008). The London Encyclopaedia (3rd ed.). Macmillan. ISBN 978-0-230-73878-2.
- Michelin; Lifestyle, Michelin Travel (2012). "20C to Today (timeline)". London. Michelin Green Guide. ISBN 978-2-06-718238-7.
- Conlin, Jonathan (2013). Tales of Two Cities: Paris, London and the Birth of the Modern City. Counterpoint LLC. ISBN 978-1-61902-225-6.
- Matera, Marc (2015). Black London: The Imperial Metropolis and Decolonization in the Twentieth Century. University of California Press. ISBN 978-0-520-95990-3.
