= Charing Cross Music Hall =

Music hall in Westminster, London, England

- 1867 The Arches; 1883 Hungerford Music Hall; 1887 Gatti's under the Arches; 1887 Gatti's Charing Cross Music Hall; 1910–1923 Arena Cinema; 1928–1939 Forum Cinema; 1939–1945 fire station 1946 Players' Theatre
- Interactive map of Charing Cross Music Hall
- Address: Villiers Street; Westminster, London
- Coordinates: 51.5075°N 0.1231°W
- Owner: Gatti family
- Capacity: 400 seated and standing 300 seated in 1945; 270 seated in 2005
- Current use: Theatre and conference centre
- Production: Visiting productions

Construction
- Years active: 1867–1910 Music hall 1946–2002 Music hall 2002 – Studio theatre

Website
- www.newplayerstheatre.com

The Charing Cross Music Hall was established beneath the arches of Charing Cross railway station in London in 1866 by brothers Giovanni and Carlo Gatti, to replace the former Hungerford Hall. The site had been acquired, together with Hungerford Market, by the South Eastern Railway in 1862, and incorporated into the railway station, which opened on 11 January 1864, resulting in the demolition of the hall.

== History ==
The music hall was built in the substantial two-level space formed by two of the arches of the undercroft of the station, and opened in 1867 as The Arches, renamed the Hungerford Music Hall in 1883, and in 1887 became known variously as the Charing Cross Music Hall, Gatti's under the Arches and Gatti's Charing Cross Music Hall. By 1895, the hall boasted an attached grand cafe and billiard saloon.

As a young man, Rudyard Kipling lived in Villiers Street, and visited Gatti's, and wrote My One and Only, for a Lion Comique at the hall. His experiences in the hall formed the basis for his Barrack-Room Ballads. Kipling also wrote a story called My Great and Only (1890) describing a visit he made to Gatti's. He wrote that the hall held four hundred "when it's all full, sir". A weekly periodical for artistes, The Music Hall and Theatre, provides a review on 23 November 1889 of a variety performance:

Twixt Love and Duty, Leo Dryden has his hands full, to say nothing of his voice, which is equally full ... Charles Ross, of Gaiety fame, so well known as the Dainty Champion, secures rounds of applause by the rendering of his new characteristic song entitled She's a real good mother ... James Fawn wants to know who cuts the policemen out? Why the soldier whom Fawn impersonated to the very life. He does like to be in the know, you know, equally so with his hearers, who would willingly sit out a whole night with him if he'd keep them in the know all the time, but James must draw the line somewhere, so he draws it at Gatti's.

Baroness Orczy, creator of the Scarlet Pimpernel, described a visit to the hall at the turn of the century in her autobiography:

The only hall which appealed to we two inveterate Bohemians was a funny little one under the arches of Charing Cross Bridge where aspirants to fame were given a trial with a view to a possible engagement in one or the other of the important halls. Thus they were 'tried on the dog', as the ordeal was called, and many a famous artiste started his or her career under the 'old arches'.
I remember seeing there the début of the Levy sisters, who became such favourites and made such fortunes afterwards. There was no stage at the 'Old Arches', only a platform in the centre of the hall, where sat enthroned the manager at a rostrum when he announced each item of the programme together with the name of the artiste about to perform and tapped the desk before him with a wooden hammer. The audience sat on seats and benches all round the central platform, very much as they do round a prize-ring. A few privileged members in the audience were permitted to sit on the platform with the manager, but this privilege entailed the obligation to pay for that gentleman's drinks.

=== Notable acts ===
Not all performers were tried on the dog. Flyers show many established artists performing, for instance, Rose Hamilton, Marie Loftus (1857-1840, mother of noted film actress Cecilia Loftus), and Harry Randall (1857–1932), performed in the Whitsuntide bill for 1895.

=== Decline and new era ===
As the popularity of music hall declined, the theatre became the Arena Cinema between 1910 and 1923, and from 1928 to 1939 the Forum Cinema. During World War II it was used as a fire station, and a store for the Army Corps of Cinematography.

== Players' Theatre ==
After the war, it was acquired from the War Office by Leonard Sachs for the Players' Theatre. There were no fittings and none of the paraphernalia for a theatre, but it still opened within three weeks. Regular performers included Hattie Jacques, Bill Owen, Ian Carmichael, Clive Dunn, Ian Wallace and John Hewer, and featured newcomers including Daphne Anderson, Patsy Rowlands, Maggie Smith, Marian Studholme, Marion Grimaldi, and Margaret Burton. In 1953, Sandy Wilson provided a commissioned work for the theatre, The Boy Friend. In a full-length version this transferred to Wyndham's Theatre, and premièred in New York with Julie Andrews in the starring role.

The Players' Theatre closed in 2002. New End Theatre attempted to revive the venue as the New Players' Theatre, but in 2005 relinquished the lease to The Pure Group, owners of the neighbouring Heaven. They continue to operate the 275-seat refurbished theatre for theatrical performance and as a conference centre.
