= Carlo Gatti =

Swiss entrepreneur in England

Carlo Gatti

Carlo Gatti (1817–1878) was a Swiss-born British restaurateur in the Victorian era. He came to England in 1847, where he established restaurants and an ice importing business. He is credited with first making ice cream available to the general public, and he then moved into the music hall business. He returned to Switzerland in 1871, leaving his businesses in the hands of members of his family, and he died a millionaire.

Gatti originated in Canton Ticino, the main Italian-speaking area of Switzerland. He was probably born in Marogno, a village then within the comune of Dongio (now part of Acquarossa) in the impoverished and sparsely populated Blenio District, where he also ended his days. He was the youngest of a family of six, and his parents were Stefano and Apollonia.

== Success in London ==
Carlo had moved to London from Paris by 1847 at the latest, and initially lived in the Italian community in Clerkenwell. At first, he ran a stall selling waffles and chestnuts. In 1849, he began to run a café and restaurant with partners. They specialised in selling chocolate and ice cream. They put a chocolate-making machine in the window to attract business, and took ice for the ice cream from Regent's Canal under a contract with the Regent's Canal Company. Their shop was the first to sell ice cream to the public; previously, ice cream was an expensive treat confined to rich people with access to an ice house.

Gatti exhibited his chocolate-making machine, imported from France, at the Great Exhibition in 1851. Also in 1851, Gatti opened a stand in Hungerford Market, near Charing Cross, to sell confectionery and cakes, hot coffee, cold soft drinks and ice cream. A portion of ice cream was sold for one penny served in a shell, perhaps the origin of the penny lick.

Gatti built a large ice warehouse, capable of storing tons of ice in two large ice wells, in the Battlebridge Basin off the Regent's Canal, near King's Cross. He began importing ice from Norway from around 1860, shipping the ice from Norway, up the Thames, then transferring it to canal barges at the Regent's Canal Dock (today the Limehouse Basin) and via the canal to his ice warehouse. Starting with a single ice well in 1857, he built a second ice well around 1862 and became the largest ice importer in London. Today, the ice warehouse houses the London Canal Museum. He began to run a fleet of delivery carts, supplying ice for domestic iceboxes.

Hungerford Market was damaged when the adjoining Hungerford Hall burned down in 1854, but Gatti was insured and used the proceeds to build a music hall, known as Gatti's, which opened in 1857. He sold the music hall to South Eastern Railway in 1862, and the site became Charing Cross railway station.

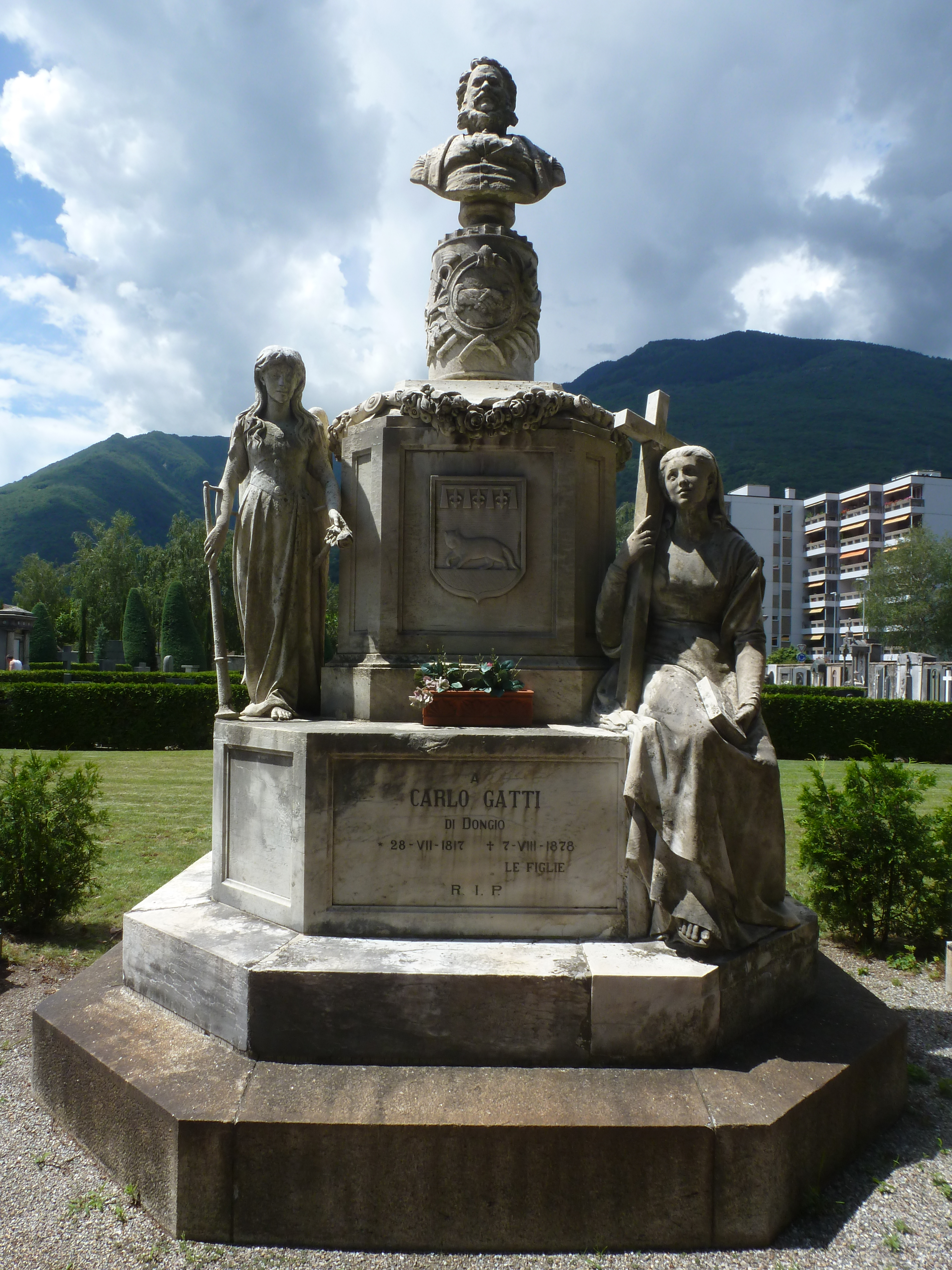
Tomb of Carlo Gatti in the town cemetery of Bellinzona

With the proceeds from selling his first music hall, Gatti acquired a restaurant in Westminster Bridge Road, opposite the Canterbury Music Hall. He converted the restaurant into a second Gatti's music hall, known as "Gatti's-in-the-Road", in 1865. It later became a cinema. The building was badly damaged in the Second World War, and was demolished in 1950.

In 1867, he acquired a public house in Villiers Street named "The Arches", under the arches of the elevated railway line leading to Charing Cross station. He opened it as another music hall, known as "Gatti's-in-The-Arches".

Members of his family were involved in his businesses, and he spent most of his time in Switzerland after 1871.

== Family ==
In 1839, Carlo was married to Maria Marioni by his eldest brother Giacomo, the priest at Castro. In 1871 he married a second wife (Marietta Andreazzi, allegedly aged 23).

== Death ==
He died on 8 September 1878. He is buried in Bellinzona (Switzerland), not far from his home valley.

According to food writer Elizabeth David, 'the ice business that he had set up endured and continued to expand for almost a century'.

His family continued to operate the Charing Cross music hall, known for a period after Gatti's death as the Hungerford or Gatti's Hungerford Palace of Varieties. It became a cinema in 1910, and the Players' Theatre in 1946.

== See also ==
- Agnes Marshall, contemporary English ice-cream entrepreneur
