= Villiers Street =

Street in the City of Westminster, London

Coordinates: 51.5080°N 0.1238°W

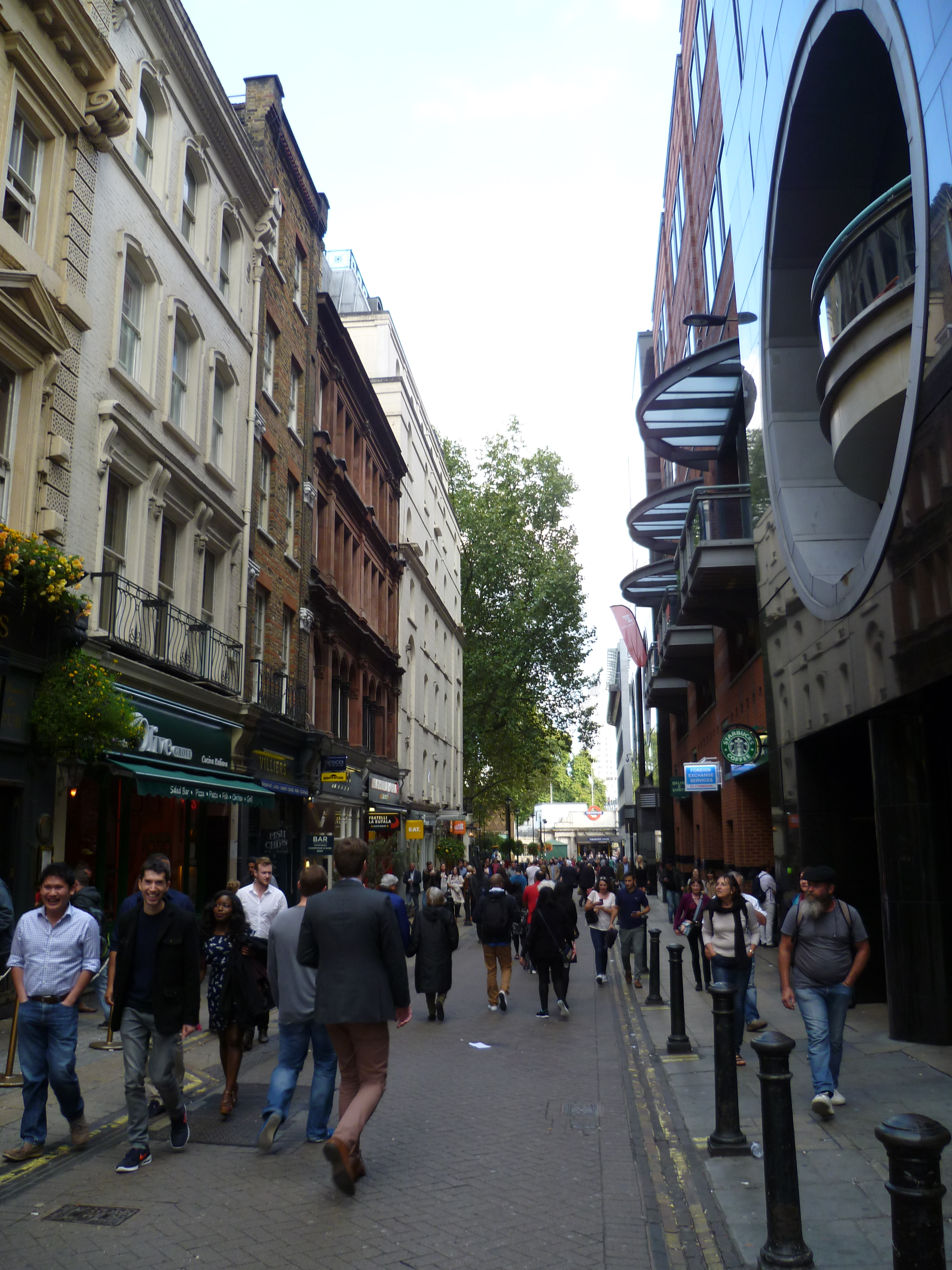
Villiers Street

Villiers Street is a street in London connecting the Strand with the Embankment. It is partly pedestrianised; traffic runs northbound only up to John Adam Street, where vehicles must turn right. It was built by Nicholas Barbon in the 1670s on the site of York House, the property of George Villiers, Duke of Buckingham, whom the street commemorates. A watergate in nearby Embankment Gardens is the only remnant of the mansion and shows the original position of the north bank of the River Thames.

John Evelyn lived here in the 17th century and the Irish writer Richard Steele, who founded The Spectator and The Tatler magazines, lodged here from 1712. The Charing Cross Hospital Medical School, now a part of the Imperial College Faculty of Medicine, was founded here in 1834. Prior to 1865, Villiers Street ran down the hill directly to a wharf by the river, known as Villiers Wharf. This was swept away in 1865 by the construction of the Victoria Embankment, with its sewers, and the District line railway. The river was moved back some 50 metres (164 ft) from the foot of Villiers Street.

== Noteworthy buildings on Villiers Street ==
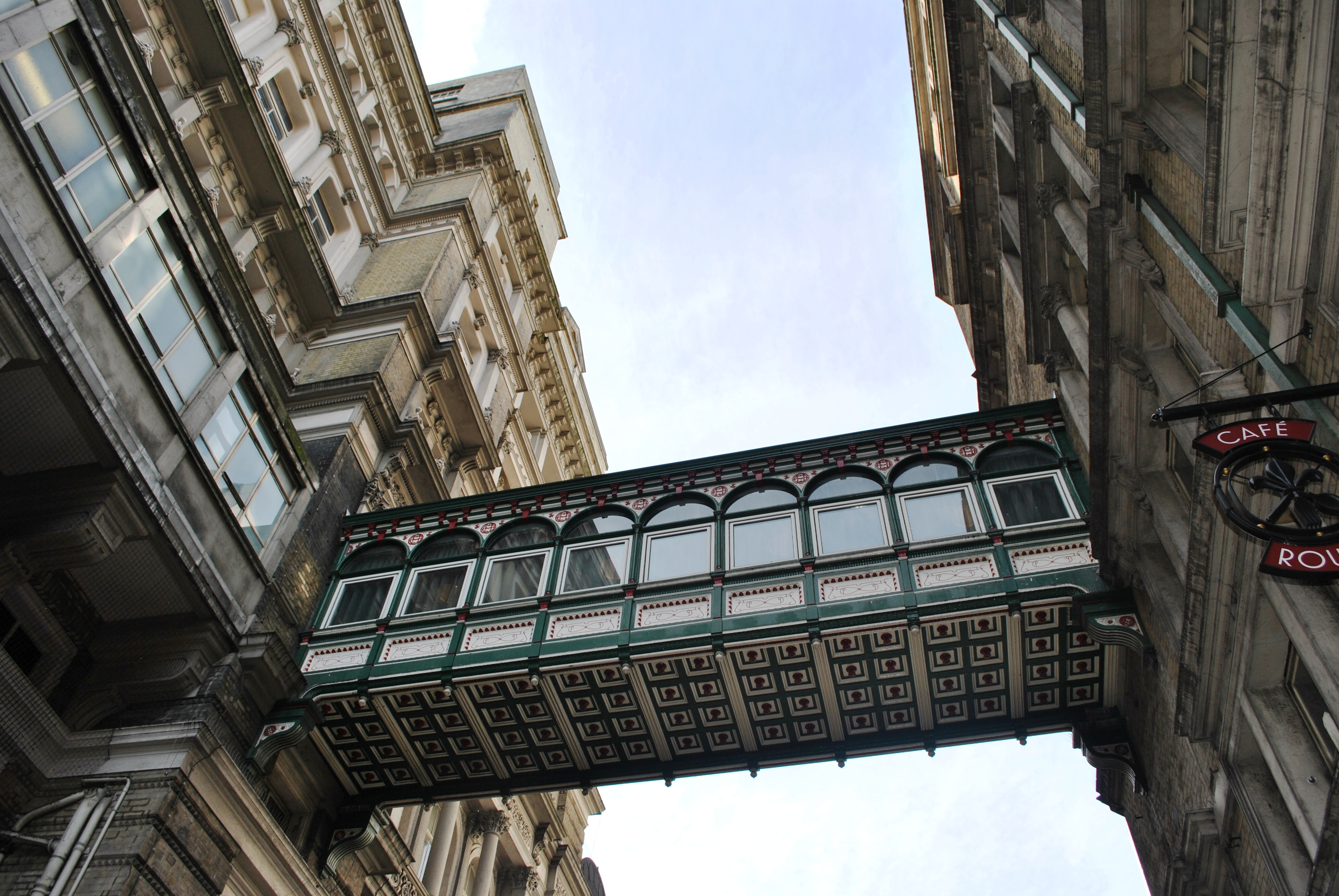
Charing Cross station passage overlooking Villiers Street

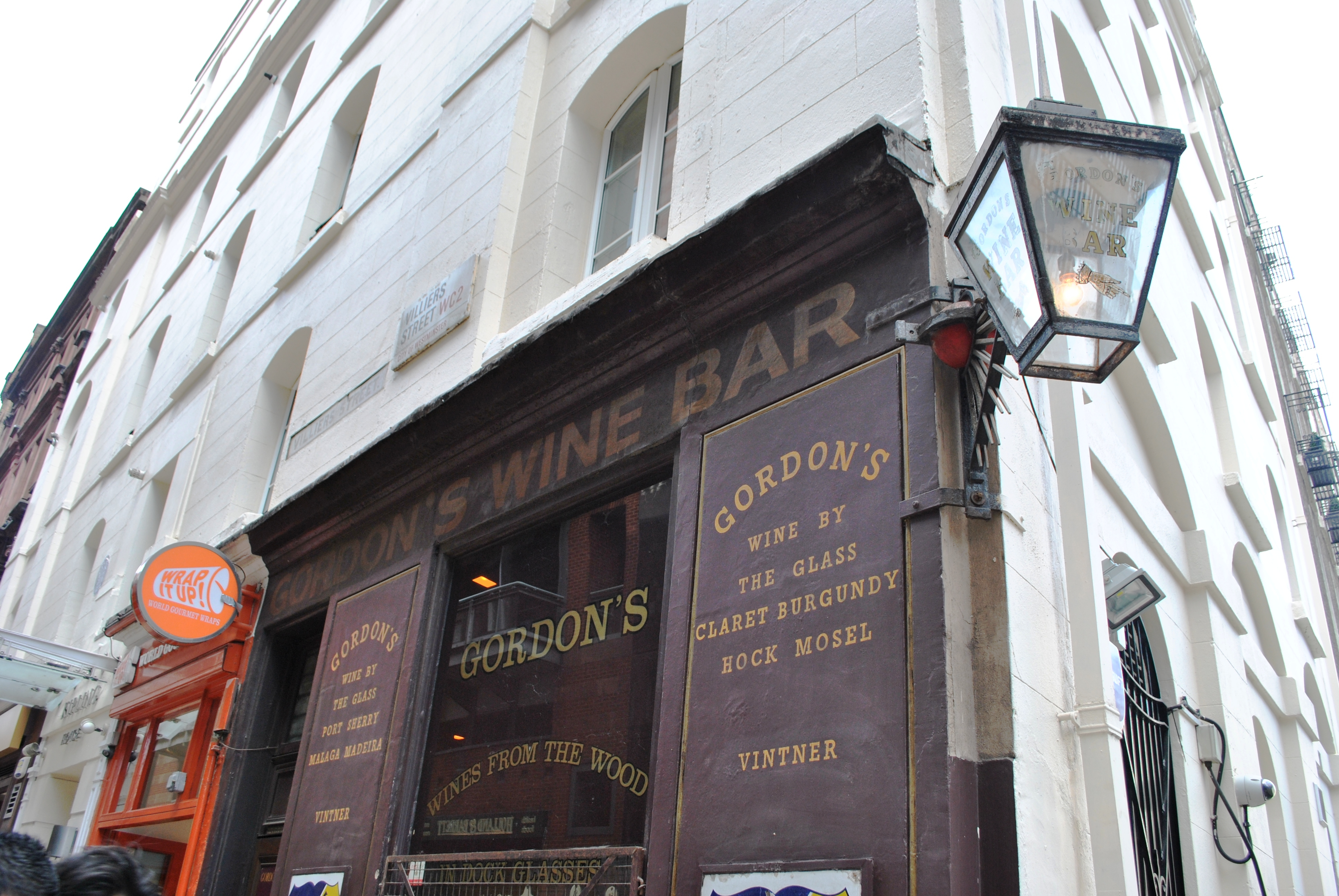
Gordon's Wine Bar

- Charing Cross railway station
- Kipling House, where Rudyard Kipling lived in 1889–91

Housing on the west side of the street was demolished in the 1860s to make way for Charing Cross station. From 1889 to 1891, Rudyard Kipling lived at small rooms with windows facing the street, at number 43 (later renamed Kipling House). He there wrote the partly autobiographical novel The Light That Failed, which contains references to the area. Kipling remarks that:

From my desk I could look out of my window through the fanlight of Gatti's Music-Hall entrance, across the street, almost on to its stage. The Charing Cross trains rumbled through my dreams on one side, the boom of the Strand on the other, while, before my windows, Father Thames under the Shot tower walked up and down with his traffic.

After the Second World War Gatti's became the noted Players' Theatre Club, founded by Leonard Sachs, specialising in music hall entertainments. This became the New Players' Theatre, adjacent to the Heaven nightclub, and is now Charing Cross Theatre.

Gordon's Wine Bar, in a basement under Kipling House and with cellars below street level and a terrace overlooking Embankment Gardens, is a popular refreshment and eating place.

== See also ==
- List of eponymous roads in London

== Sources ==
"Villiers Street" in Ben Weinreb and Christopher Hibbert (1983) The London Encyclopedia.
