= Gordon's Wine Bar =

London's oldest wine bar

Coordinates: 51.507943°N 0.123319°W

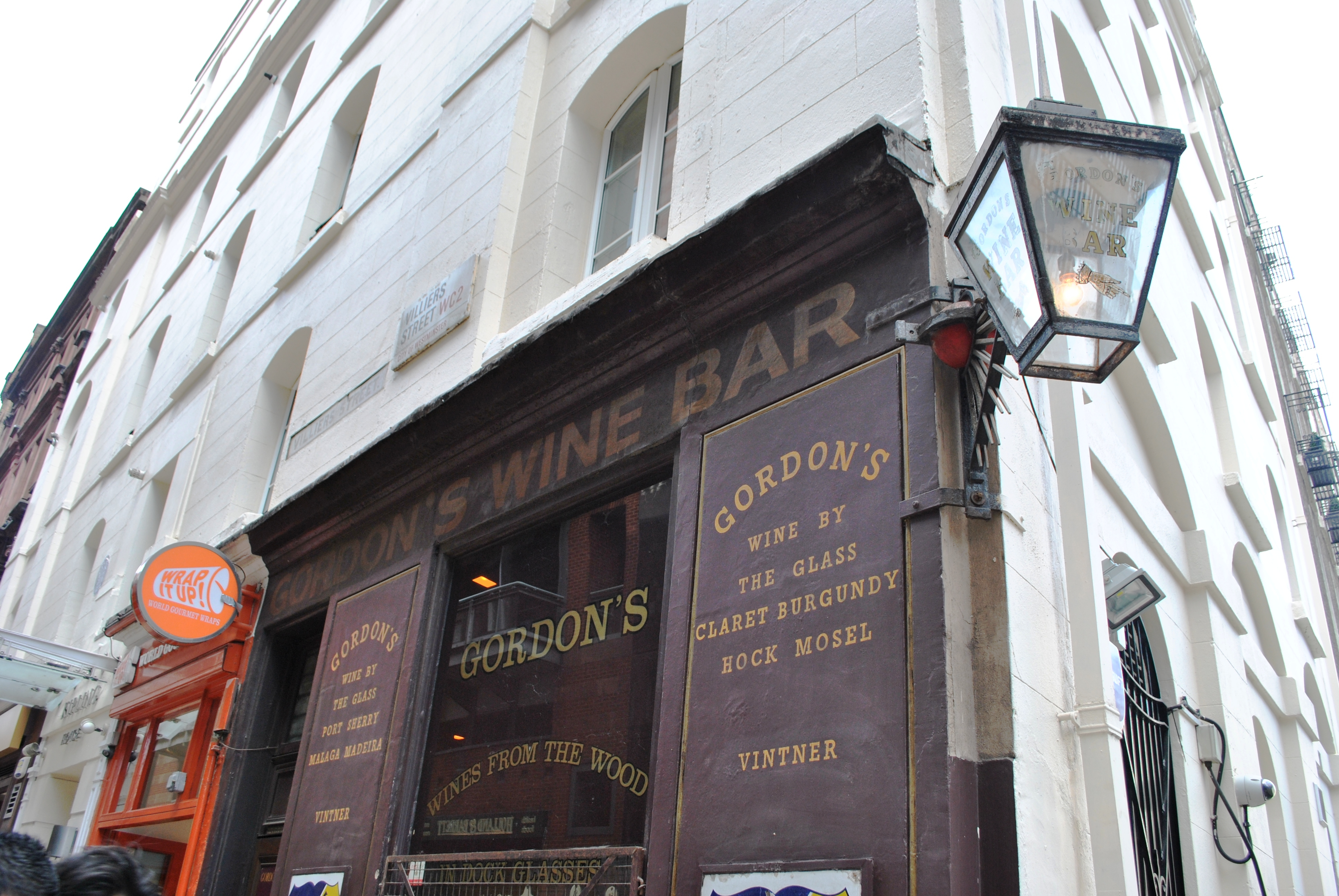
Gordon's Wine Bar

Gordon’s Wine Bar, which was established in 1890, is thought to be the oldest wine bar in London. The business is currently owned by Wendy Gordon (wife of the late Luis Gordon) and managed by their eldest son, Simon Gordon (also founder of biometric surveillance company Facewatch)
