= Hungerford Hall =

Coordinates: 51.5082°N 0.1253°W

Hungerford Hall was a lecture theatre built beside Hungerford Market near Charing Cross in London in 1851. It was used for public entertainments, including demonstrations of magic, mesmerism and optical illusions. It burned down in 1854, badly damaging the adjoining Hungerford Market.

Swiss-Italian entrepreneur Carlo Gatti constructed a music hall on the site, which opened in 1857. It was bought by the South Eastern Railway in 1862, and incorporated into Charing Cross railway station, which opened on 11 January 1864.
