= Hungerford Market =

Former market in London

Coordinates: 51.5078°N 0.1244°W

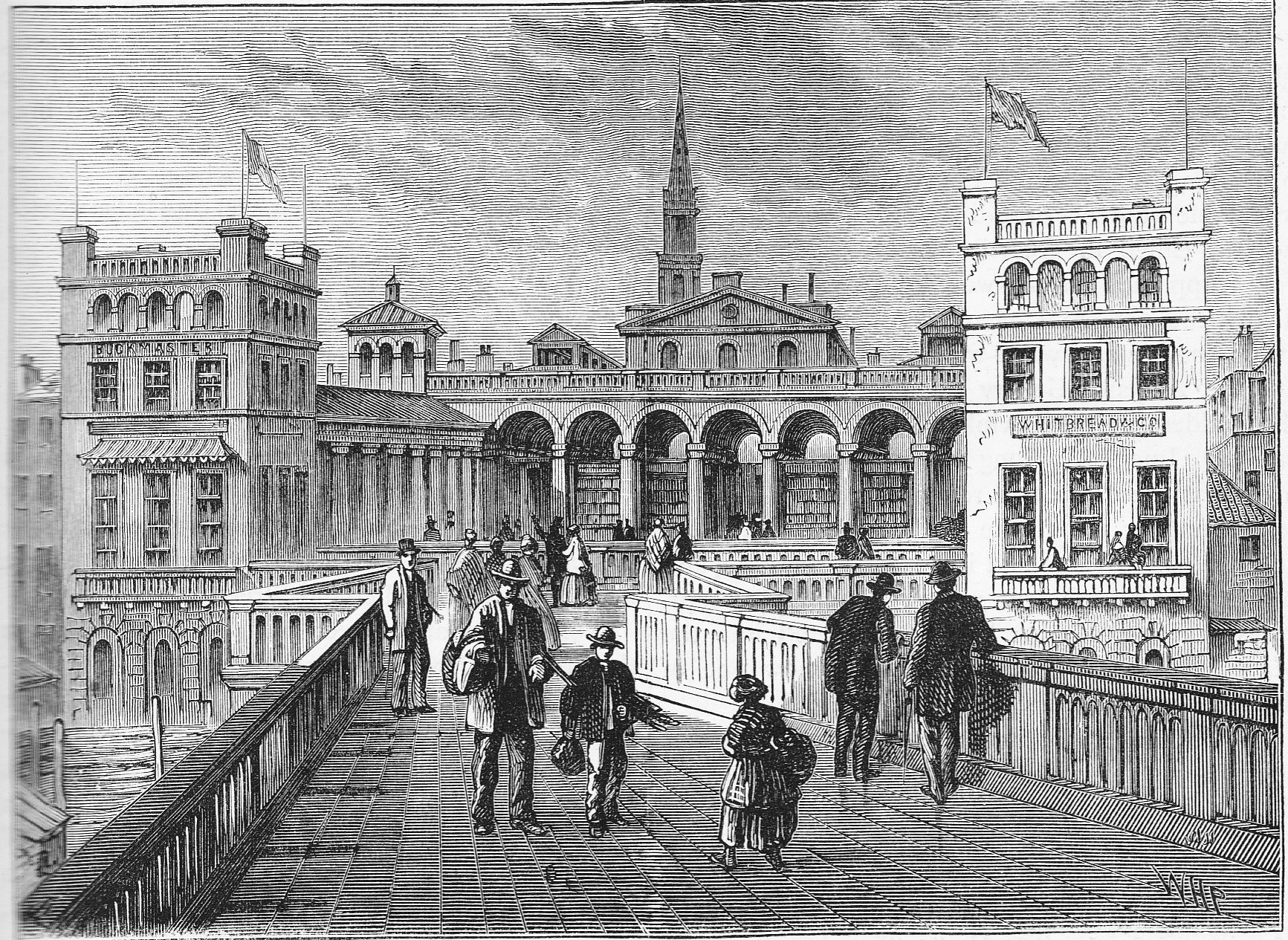
"Hungerford Market, from the bridge, in 1850". Engraving by "WHP" published in Edward Walford's "Old and New London", 1878. New Hungerford Market, built circa 1832, viewed from Hungerford Bridge. The Church of St Martins-in-the-Field is visible in the background

New Hungerford Market, River Thames front, view before the building of Hungerford Bridge

Hungerford Market was a produce market in London, at Charing Cross on the Strand. It existed in two different buildings on the same site, the first built in 1682, the second in 1832. The market was first built on the site of Hungerford House, next to Durham Yard, the town house of the Hungerford family. The house had burned down in 1669 as is recorded in the Diary of Samuel Pepys. It was replaced by a new Italianate market building by Charles Fowler, which opened in 1833. The new market was unsuccessful. It was damaged when the adjoining Hungerford Hall burned down in 1854, and was sold to the South Eastern Railway in 1862. Charing Cross railway station was built on the site and opened in 1864.

== Site ==
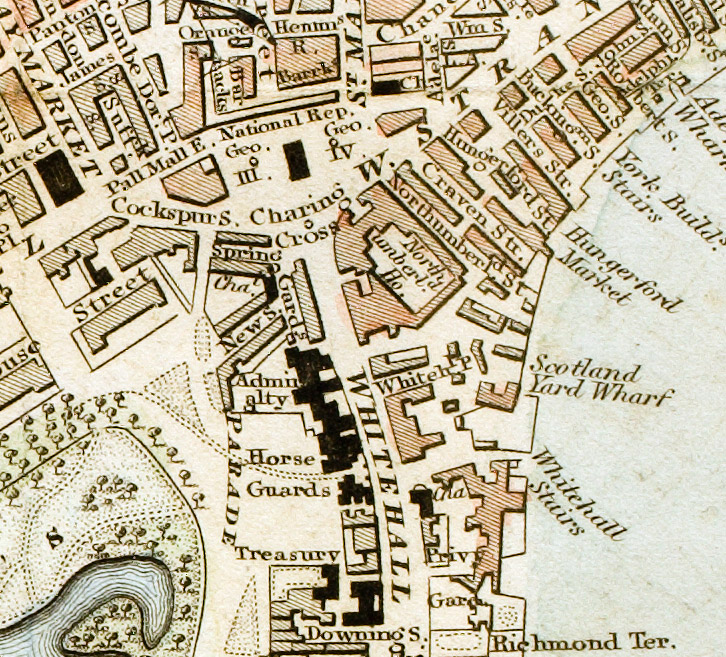
Schmollinger's map of 1833 showing Old Hungerford Market. Durham House was a previous occupant of the site

The site became the property of the Hungerford family of Farleigh Hungerford Castle near Bath in Somerset in 1425, when it was acquired from Sir Robert Chalons and his wife Blanche by Sir Walter Hungerford (later Baron Hungerford), Speaker of the House of Commons and Steward of the Household of King Henry V. By 1444, it was known as "Hungerford Inn". Walter Hungerford's grandson, Robert Hungerford, 3rd Baron Hungerford, and great-grandson, Thomas Hungerford, Speaker of the Commons, were both attainted for supporting the Lancastrian cause during the Wars of the Roses, in 1461 and 1469 respectively.

King Henry VII granted the land back to Thomas's brother, Walter Hungerford. His daughter-in law, Agnes Hungerford, was hanged at Tyburn in 1523, for the murder of her first husband John Cotell. His grandson, also Walter, was accused in 1540 of treason and perversion, and King Henry VIII had him executed alongside his patron Thomas Cromwell. His son, another Walter, was regranted the property in 1544. It finally passed down the family to Sir Edward Hungerford (1632–1711), created a Knight of the Order of the Bath at the coronation of Charles II.

== First market ==
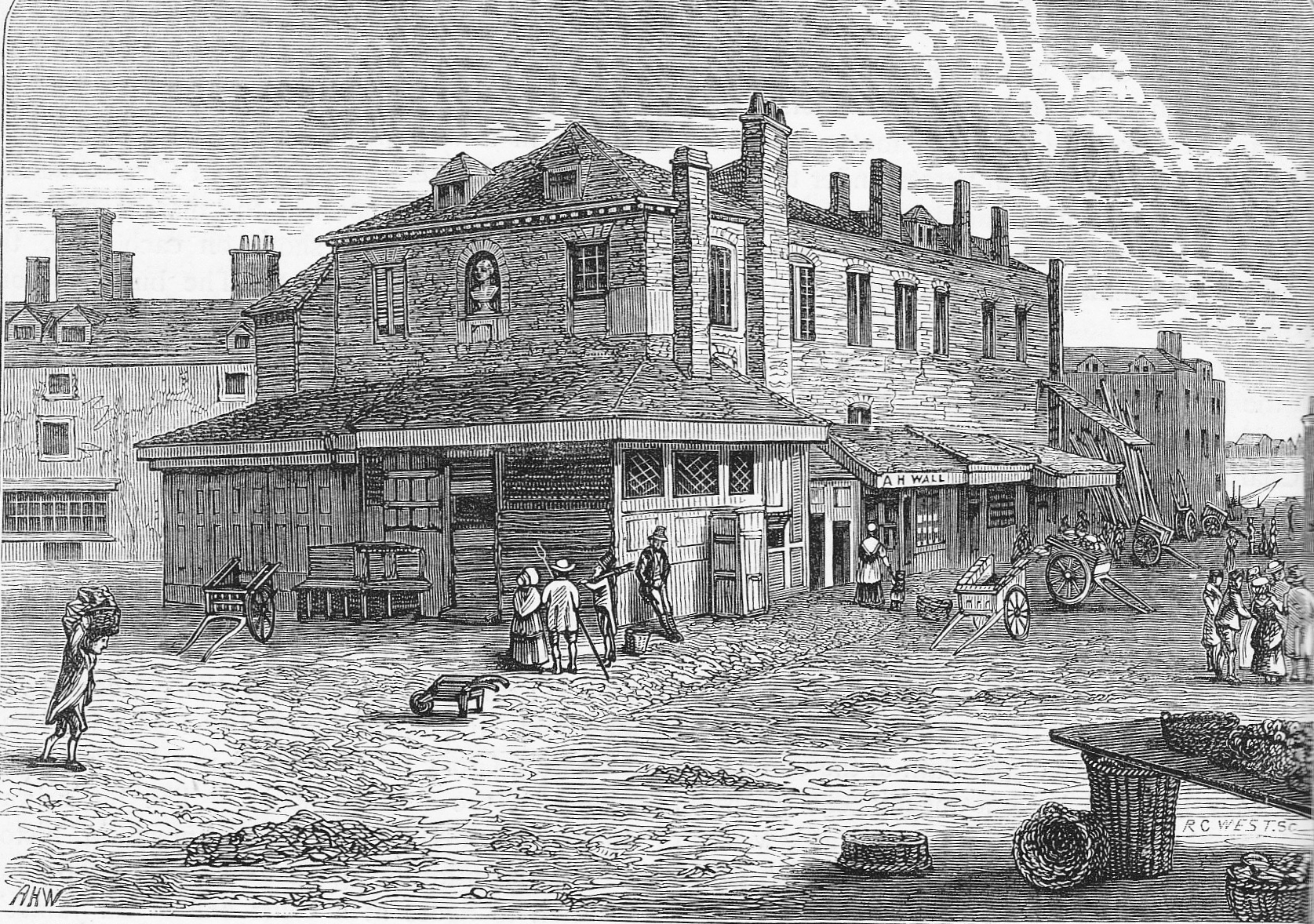
"Old Hungerford Market (from a view published in 1805)". The bust of Sir Edward Hungerford (d.1711) is visible set high into the north wall. Engraving by R.C. West, 1805, published in Edward Walford's "Old and New London", 1878

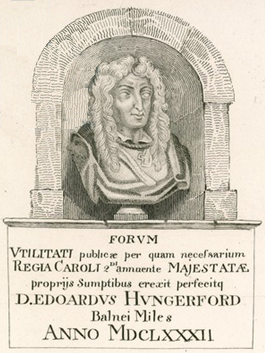
Drawing of bust of Sir Edward Hungerford (d.1711) formerly on the north front of Old Hungerford Market. Private collection. Latin inscription: Forum utilitate publicae per quem necessarium Regia Caroli (Secun)di annuente Majestatae propriis sumptibus erexit perfecitq(ue) D(ominus) Edoardus Hungerford Balnei Miles anno MDCLXXXII ("This market for the use of the public, with the royal consent of His Majesty Charles the Second, Lord Edward Hungerford, Knight of the Bath, erected and completed at his own expense in the year 1682")

Sir Edward Hungerford (d. 1711) obtained permission to hold a market on the site for three days a week. Hungerford Inn, or seemingly the burned-out remains of it, was subdivided into shops and with a covered piazza, formed the market. The market never prospered and Hungerford sold the site in parcels to the politician Sir Stephen Fox between 1681 and 1684, and Sir Christopher Wren bought a quarter of the property, and a quarter of the rents. In 1685 Fox and Wren obtained a license to sell grain, but achieved little increase in trade. A market house was built in the centre of the site, possibly designed by Wren himself. Hungerford squandered his money, dying a poor Knight of Windsor in 1711. In 1718 the market was sold to the royal gardener Henry Wise and remained in his family until 1830, when it was bought by the newly formed Hungerford Market Company.

== New market ==
Hungerford Market Company Act 1830
- Act of Parliament
- Parliament of the United Kingdom
- Long title: An Act to incorporate certain Persons, to be called "The Hungerford Market Company," for the re-establishment of a Market for the Sale of Fish, Poultry and Meat, and other articles of general consumption and use, and for other purposes.
- Citation: 11 Geo. 4 & 1 Will. 4. c. lxx

Dates
- Royal assent: 29 May 1830

Text of statute as originally enacted

Hungerford Market Company Act 1836
- Act of Parliament
- Parliament of the United Kingdom
- Long title: An Act to alter and enlarge the Powers of an Act passed in the Eleventh Year of the Reign of His late Majesty, for incorporating the Hungerford Market Company.
- Citation: 6 & 7 Will. 4. c. lxviii

Dates
- Royal assent: 21 June 1836

Other legislation
- Amends: Hungerford Market Company Act 1830

Text of statute as originally enacted

By the beginning of the 19th century, the old market had become dilapidated. The Hungerford Market Company Act 1830 (11 Geo. 4 & 1 Will. 4. c. lxx) was obtained to incorporate a company to re-establish the market. The company acquired the site of the old market, together with the adjoining houses in Hungerford street, and a few in the Strand. All the existing buildings were demolished, and a new structure was built in 1831-3 to an Italianate design by Charles Fowler, the architect of Covent Garden Market. The building contract was the first undertaken by the partnership of Grissell and Peto, who later went on to build Nelson's Column, the Reform Club, and the Lyceum Theatre, The buildings were mostly of granite.

The area occupied by the new market was a strip 126 feet wide, extending 465 feet northward towards the Strand. In addition, next to the river, was a wharf, about 200 feet long, with steps down to the water. The market itself was divided into three sections. The lower level of the site was occupied by a fish market, consisting of an open court, 130 feet long, with two tiers of colonnaded galleries on each side. By 1830 the replacement of Old London Bridge meant that fishing boats could then come further upstream to deliver their catch, and the company hoped to break the monopoly of Billingsgate Market by providing a more convenient supply of fish for the West End. Fowler later built an iron roof over the open court to protect the fishmongers' stalls and two end pavilions towards the river were used as taverns.

At the northern end of this lower court a flight of steps led to the upper level, which was elevated over storage vaults. The Great Hall, an aisled timber-roofed building 160 feet long, housed a fruit and vegetable market. To the north of that was another open court, flanked by colonnades and butchers' shops. New Hungerford Street led from there into the Strand. Fowler exploited the complexities of the site for dramatic effect, leading Thomas Leverton Donaldson to talk of "the playful picturesqueness of the group, where court rose above court, galleries above galleries, and where the series of roofs outtopped each other."

A suspension bridge leading to the market from Lambeth on the south bank of the River Thames was built by Isambard Kingdom Brunel in 1845, and a hall for lectures, named Hungerford Hall, was built next-door in 1851. In the same year of 1851, the Swiss-Italian entrepreneur Carlo Gatti opened a stand at the market selling pastries and ice cream, priced at one penny and served in a shell. This was perhaps the first time that ice cream was made available to the paying general public.

== Demolition ==
The market found itself unable to challenge more specialist markets, such as Billingsgate, and Covent Garden, and was badly damaged when Hungerford Hall burned down in 1854. It was sold to the South Eastern Railway in 1862 which demolished it to make way for Charing Cross railway station, which opened on 11 January 1864. Brunel's suspension bridge was replaced with the new nine-span Hungerford Railway Bridge, and its chains were re-used to complete the Clifton Suspension Bridge in Bristol.

== Vestiges ==
The Hungerford family are commemorated in the name of the Hungerford Bridge, which leads into Charing Cross from the south bank of the River Thames.

== See also ==
- Market (place)
- Retail
