= Duncannon Street =

Street in London, England

Coordinates: 51.508600°N 0.126511°W

Duncannon Street as seen from the Strand

Duncannon Street is a short street in London. It runs between Trafalgar Square in the west and the Strand in the east.

== History and description ==
The area around the Church of St Martin-in-the-Fields was previously a network of small alleys and courtyards. William Lowther as Chief Commissioner of Woods and Forests put forward a new scheme known as the West Strand Improvements which cut new roads through the area. Laid out in the 1830s, the street is named for John Ponsonby, Viscount Duncannon who served as Chief Commissioner from 1831 to 1834. His predecessor George Agar-Ellis similarly gave his name to nearby Agar Street. The street's route cut through the churchyard of St Martin-in-the-Fields.

The north of the street is occupied by St Martin-in-the-Fields and the corner of 430–449 Strand, a Regency block by John Nash. In between is the mostly pedestrianised Adelaide Street. On the southern side of the street is a large block which contains South Africa House.
