= List of award-winning pubs in London =

English pubs

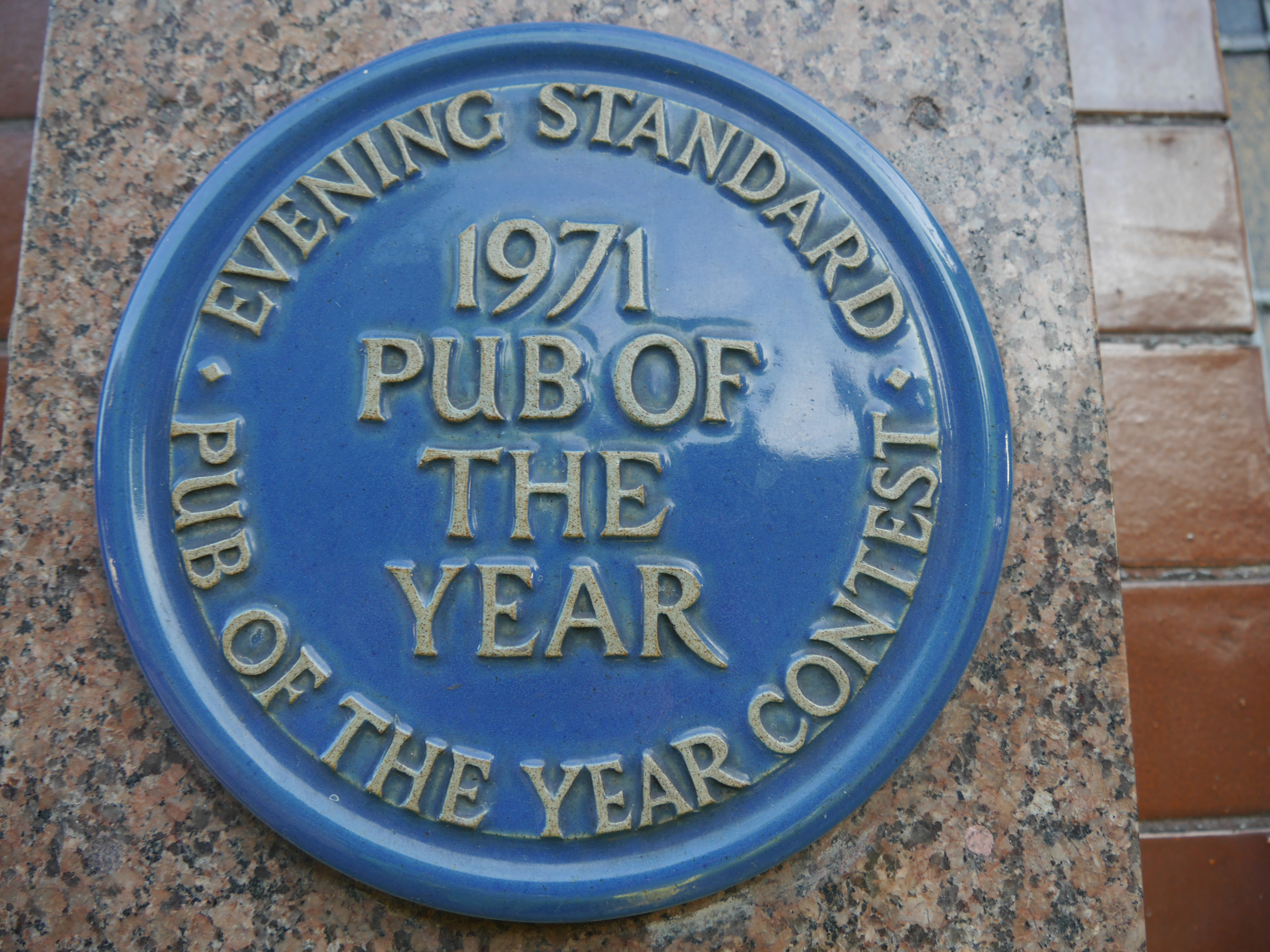
Duke of Cumberland, Fulham award plaque, 1971

This is a list of award-winning pubs in London.

== Pub Design Awards (PDA) ==
The Pub Design Awards are hosted by CAMRA and English Heritage.

- 2001 Conversion Award: Porterhouse, Maiden Lane
- 1999 Conversion Award: Half Moon, Mile End Road (Joint Winner with Billiard Hall, West Bromwich)

== CAMRA National Pub of the Year ==
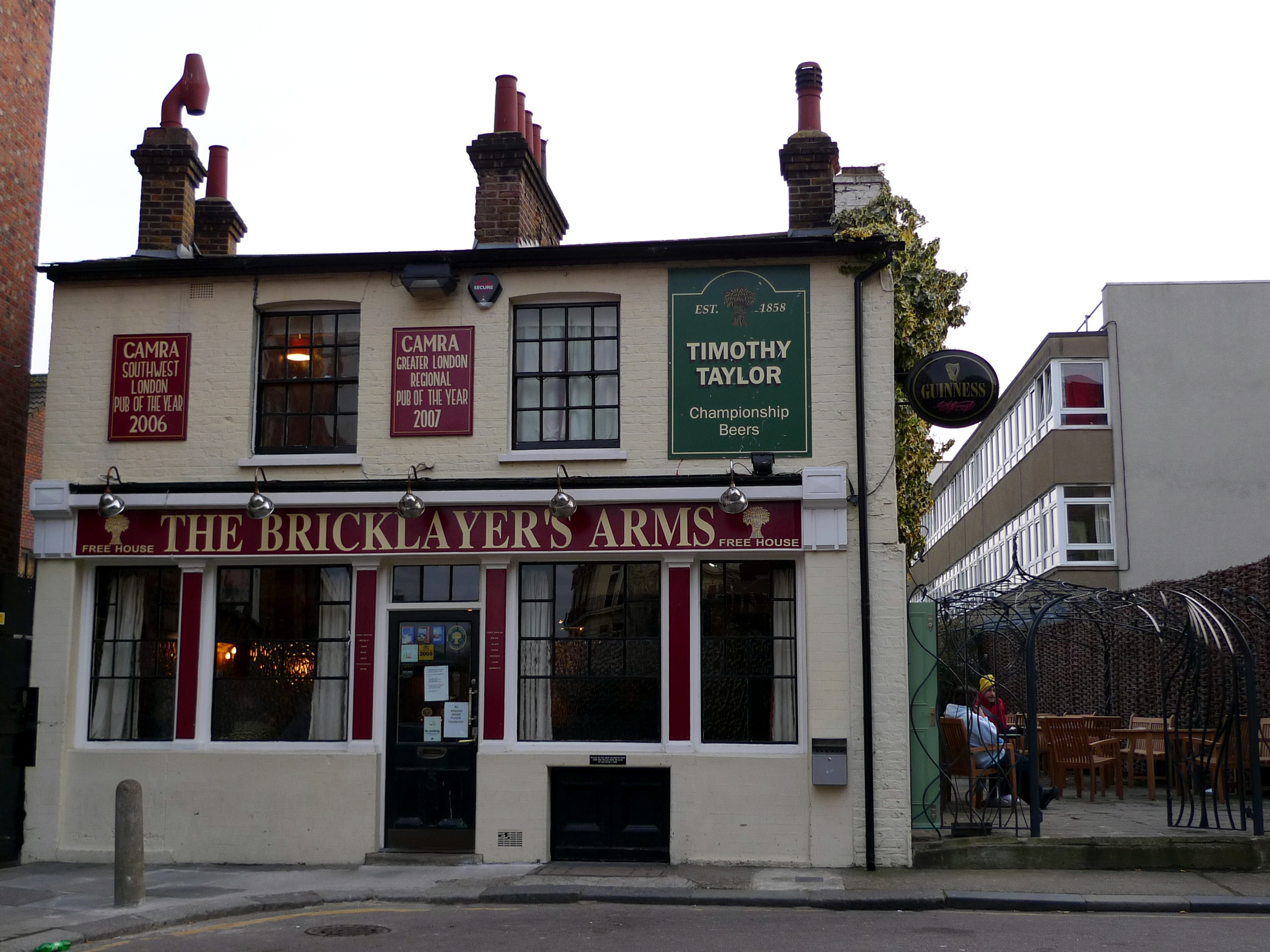
The Bricklayer's Arms

=== National Pub of the Year Award ===
The Harp in Charing Cross won in 2010 as announced in February 2011.

Greater London regional winners

- 2024: Little Green Dragon, Winchmore Hill
- 2023: The Hope, Carshalton
- 2022: The Hop Inn, Hornchurch
- 2021: The Hop Inn, Hornchurch
- 2020: Competition cancelled due to COVID-19 pandemic
- 2019: The Hope, Carshalton
- 2018: Little Green Dragon, Winchmore Hill
- 2017: The Hope, Carshalton
- 2016: The Hope, Carshalton – The first time a pub has concurrently held "CAMRA Greater London Pub of the Year" and "SPBW London Pub of the Year" awards
- 2015: One Inn The Wood, Petts Wood, Orpington
- 2014: The Door Hinge, Welling (with equal votes, but declared runner-up, The Hope, Carshalton)
- 2013: The Hope, Carshalton – The first time the CAMRA Greater London Pub of the Year title had been retained by a pub
- 2012: The Hope, Carshalton
- 2011: Southampton Arms, Kentish Town
- 2010: The Harp, Charing Cross
- 2009: The Bricklayer's Arms, Putney
- 2008: The Trafalgar, Merton
- 2007: The Bricklayer's Arms, Putney

== SPBW London Pub of the Year ==
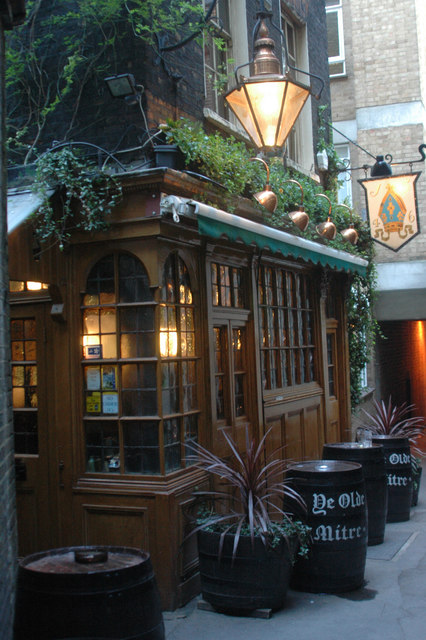
Ye Olde Mitre

The Society for the Preservation of Beers from the Wood (SPBW) usually chooses a "London Pub of the Year" every year.

=== SPBW previous winners ===
- 2023: Competition not held
- 2022: Competition not held
- 2021: Competition cancelled due to COVID-19 pandemic
- 2020: Competition cancelled due to COVID-19 pandemic

SPBW decided to make 2 awards for 2019 London Pub of the Year to bring the competition in line in future with the calendar year in which judging takes place.

- 2019: (2nd award): Ye Olde Mitre, Holborn
- 2019: The River Ale House, 131 Woolwich Road, East Greenwich, Greenwich
- 2018: The Broken Drum, 308 Westwood Lane, Blackfen, Sidcup
- 2017: Chesham Arms, Homerton
- 2016: The Hope, Carshalton
- 2015: Blythe Hill Tavern, Forest Hill
- 2014: The Eleanor Arms, Bow
- 2013: Ye Olde Mitre, Holborn
- 2012: The Royal Oak, Southwark
- 2011: The Dog & Bell, Deptford
- 2010: The Pembury Tavern Hackney
- 2009: The Dog & Bell, Deptford
- 2008: The Harp, Charing Cross
- 2007: The Pembury Tavern, Hackney
- 2006: The Royal Oak, Southwark
- 2005: The Dog & Bell, Deptford
- 2004: The Royal Oak, Southwark
- 2003: The Wenlock Arms, Hoxton

== Evening Standard Pub of the Year ==
The Evening Standard's award logo from 2004

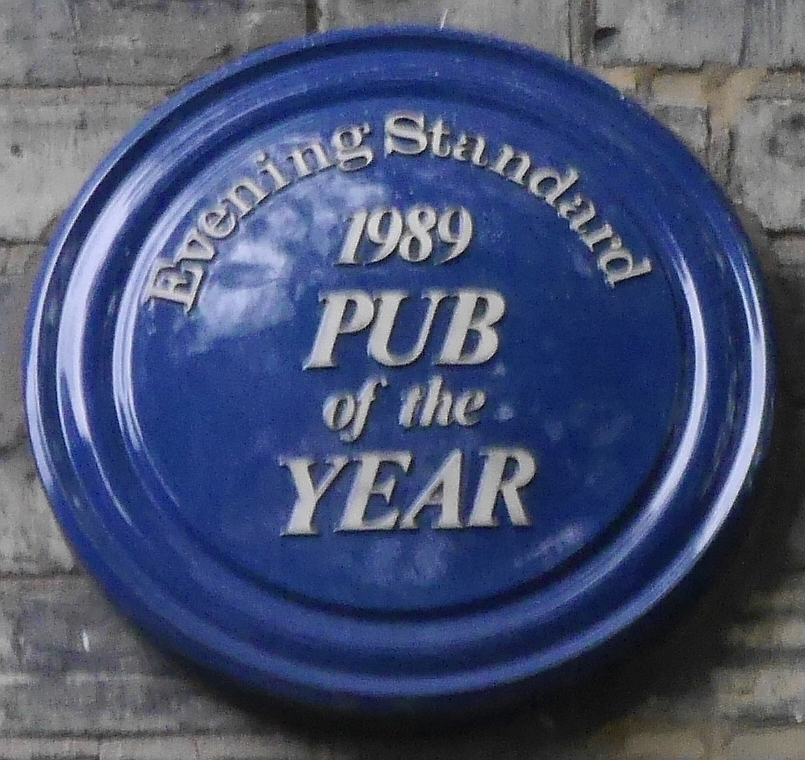
Scarsdale Tavern award plaque, 1989

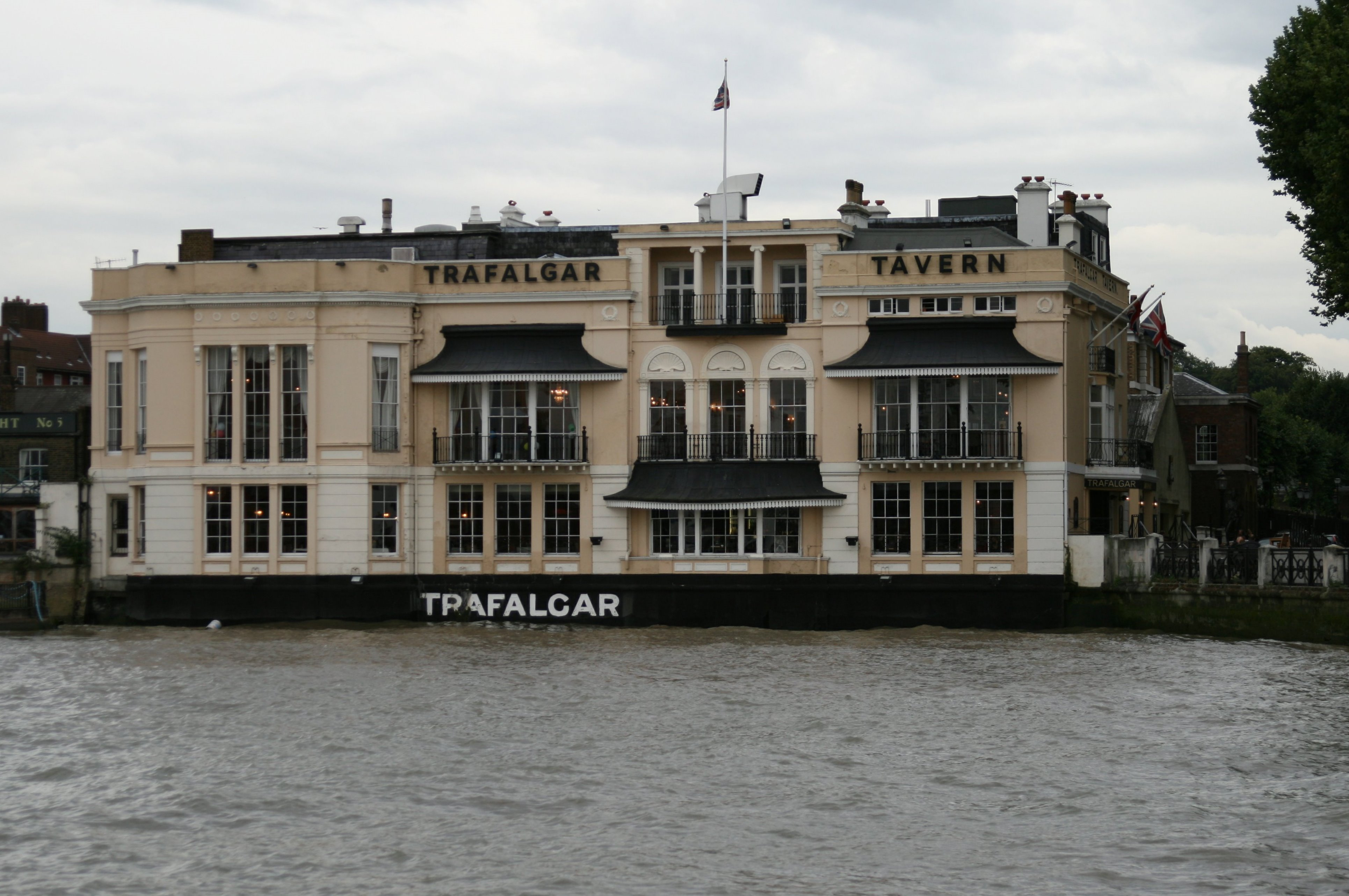
Trafalgar Tavern

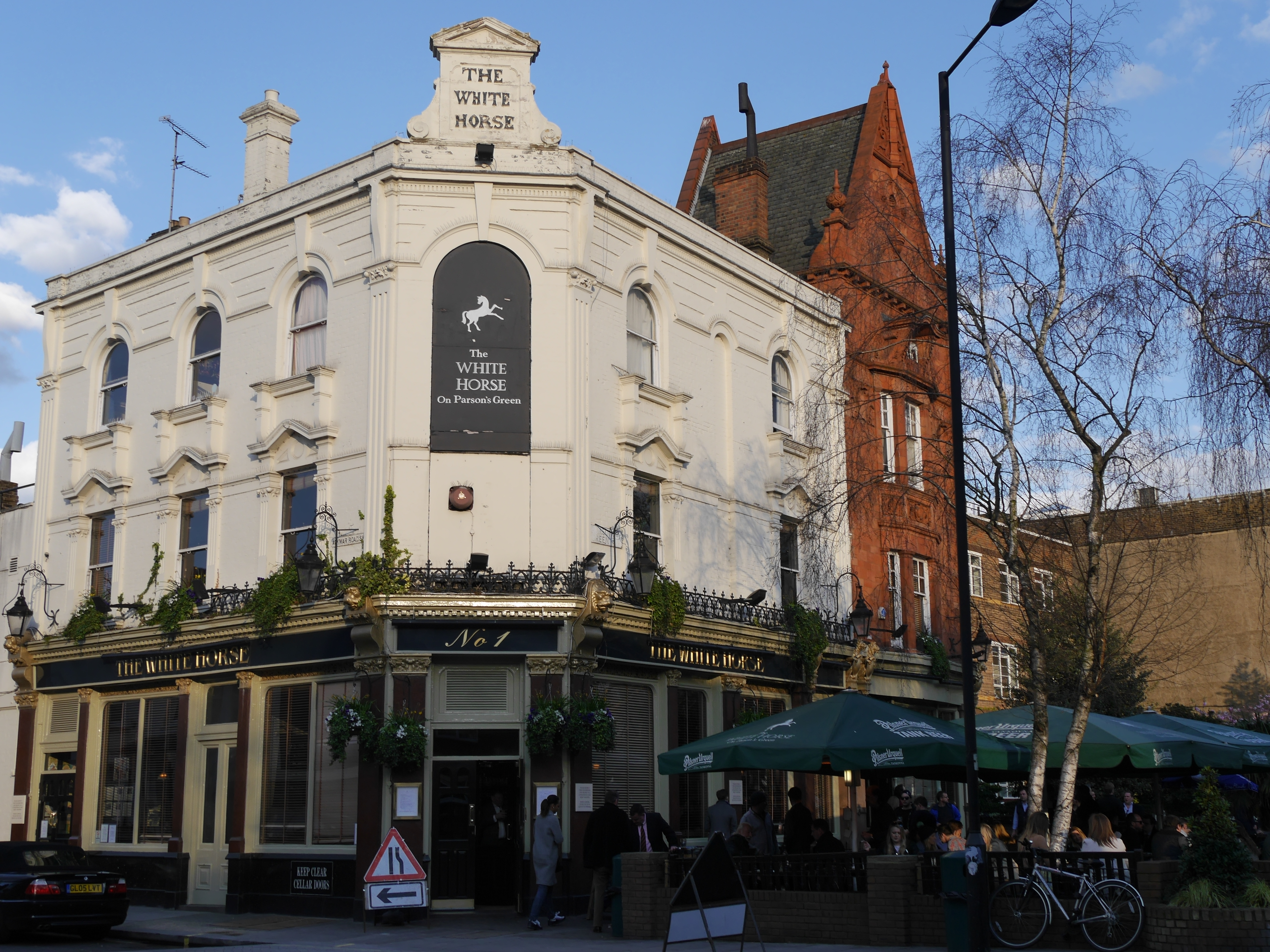
The White Horse

The "Evening Standard Pub of the Year" title was awarded annually, from 1967 to 2006, to a pub selected from a shortlist by readers of the Evening Standard, London's main evening newspaper. Each winner of the award is permitted to display a plaque on the wall outside. The award was discontinued in 2006 after 40 years.

=== Evening Standard previous winners ===
- 2006: The Clarence, Balham
- 2005: The Morgan Arms, Mile End
- 2004: The Earl Spencer, Southfields
- 2003: Draper's Arms, Islington
- 2002: The Bedford, Balham
- 2001: The Settle Inn, Battersea
- 2000: The Cow Saloon Bar, Paddington
- 1999: The Churchill Arms, Kensington
- 1998: The Duke of Cambridge, Battersea
- 1997: The White Swan, Twickenham
- 1996: The Trafalgar Tavern, Greenwich
- 1994/1995: The George Inn, Southwark
- 1993: The Phoenix & Firkin, Southwark
- 1992: The Star Tavern, Westminster
- 1991: The Ship, Wandsworth
- 1990: The White Horse, Parsons Green
- 1989: The Scarsdale Tavern, Kensington and Chelsea
- 1988: The Anglesea Arms, South Kensington
- 1987: No Award
- 1986: The Princess Louise, Holborn
- 1985: The Clifton, Clifton Hill, St John's Wood
- 1984: The Albert, Westminster
- 1983: The Castle, Surbiton
- 1982: The Hand in Hand, Wimbledon
- 1981: The Railway Bell, Norwood
- 1980: The Rose of York, Richmond
- 1979: The Royal Oak, New Malden
- 1978: The Old Ship, Hammersmith
- 1977: The Angel, Bermondsey, SE16
- 1976: The Orange Tree, Richmond
- 1975: The Greyhound, Kensington and Chelsea
- 1974: The Flask, Highgate
- 1973: The Pied Bull, Streatham
- 1972: The Victoria, Bermondsey SE1
- 1971: The Duke of Cumberland, Parsons Green
- 1970: The Rose and Crown, Wimbledon
- 1967: The Red Lion, Brentford

== See also ==
- List of bars
- List of public house topics
