= Chandos Place =

Street in London, England

Coordinates: 51.510058°N 0.125009°W

Buildings on Chandos Place

Chandos Place is a street in the City of Westminster in London. It runs from William IV Street in the southwest to Bedford Street in the northeast.

== History and description ==
The street was first built up in the 1630s and named as Chandos Street for Giles Brydges, 3rd Baron Chandos whose daughter Catherine Brydges married Francis Russell, 4th Earl of Bedford whose family owned the land. The current name was adopted in 1937. From early the street was occupied largely by tradesman and craftsmen, and saw redevelopment in the 1680s and again in the 1730s. It was at the Hole-in-the-Wall, an inn on the street at the corner with Bedfordsbury where the Marquis of Granby now stands, that highwayman Claude Duval was arrested.

In the 1830s, the southern side of the street was largely redeveloped as part of the West Strand Improvements. This included the block originally built for the Charing Cross Hospital and now housing the Charing Cross Police Station. The building remains today with the block of 1870s offices of Nos. 1-5 Chandos Place completing the majority of the southern elevations. The northern side is more varied with some early postmodern examples by Rock Townsend, including Nos. 53-59 which replaced a Peabody estate. Also present are a number of surviving Victorian houses, shops and public houses such as the Marquis of Granby and The Harp. The modern street meets with Agar Street, Bedfordbury, William IV Street and Bedford Street and its course continues in its east as Maiden Lane and in its west as Adelaide Street.

== Former residents ==
Former residents of the street include:

- John Herne, lawyer.
- Dudley North, 3rd Baron North, politician.
- Adrian Scrope, signed the death warrant of Charles I.
- George Kirke, Member of Parliament.
- John Trenchard, Nicholas Weston, and Sir William Lister, members of the Long Parliament.
- John Kersey, mathematician.
- Edward Hungerford, founder of Hungerford Market.

== See also ==
- Adelaide Street
