= Agar Street, London =

Street in London, England

Coordinates: 51.509855°N 0.124470°W

Agar Street

Agar Street is a short street in London. It runs from Chandos Place in the north to the Strand, where it meets William IV Street, in the south. Access to the Strand is pedestrian only.

== History and description ==
The street was previously part of an area small alleys and courtyards around the church of St Martin-in-the-Fields. In a scheme known as the West Strand Improvements spearheaded by William Lowther the Chief Commissioner of Woods and Forests, new roads were cut through the area. Laid out in the 1830s, the street is named for George Agar-Ellis successor of Lowther as Chief Commissioner.

The west side of the street is mainly occupied by the 1830 building of the Charing Cross Hospital by Decimus Burton. The building is now home to the Charing Cross Police Station. On the east side are three buildings, notably the Embassy of Zimbabwe designed by Charles Holden.
