= William IV Street =

Street in London, England

Coordinates: 51.509501°N 0.125480°W

Looking east down William IV Street towards the Strand

William IV Street is a street in London. It runs from Charing Cross road in the west to Agar Street in the east where it meets the Strand with pedestrian only access.

== History and description ==
The street was previously the area of a network of small alleys and courtyards around the church of St Martin-in-the-Fields. These were replaced by new roads a scheme known as the West Strand Improvements spearheaded by William Lowther the Chief Commissioner of Woods and Forests. Laid out in the 1830s, it was originally named King William Street after William IV and is perpendicular to Adelaide Street redeveloped at the same time and named for his consort Adelaide of Saxe-Meiningen. Trafalgar Square which was also laid out around the same time as part of the broader improvements of the area was at first also to be named after William, but was instead named for the British victory at the Battle of Trafalgar by suggestion of George Ledwell Taylor.

The western section of the street contains a number of smaller properties, with No. 40 housing Chatto & Windus and the Hogarth Press. The eastern section of the street is characterised by two large Regency stucco blocks. To the north is the building which formerly housed the Charing Cross Hospital and Toole's Theatre which is now home to the Charing Cross Police Station. To the south is the office block 430–449 Strand which held the Adelaide Gallery and now includes the offices of Coutts Bank.
