= 430–449 Strand =

Regency building in London, England

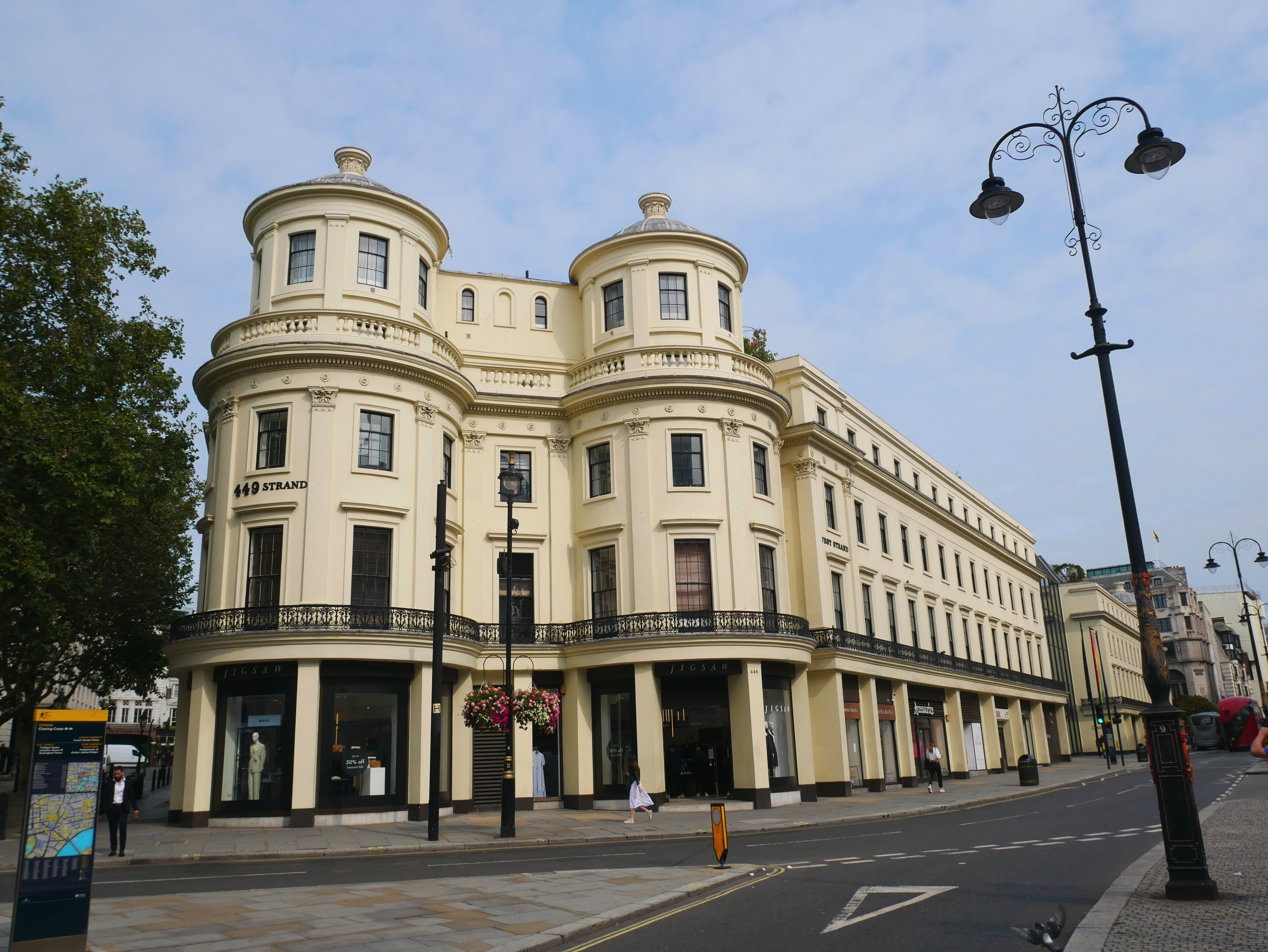
- 430–449 Strand

General information
- Type: Office
- Architectural style: Regency
- Location: London, England
- Coordinates: 51°30′33″N 0°07′30″W
- Completed: 1832

Design and construction
- Architect: John Nash

Listed Building – Grade II*
- Official name: 430, 440 AND 449, STRAND WC2, 5 AND 7, WILLIAM IV STREET WC2, 434-437, STRAND WC2, 3-10, ADELAIDE STREET WC2, 1, ADELAIDE STREET WC2
- Designated: 02 July 1969
- Reference no.: 1237040

430–449 Strand is a Grade II* listed Regency office block standing on a triangular plot between the Strand, William IV Street and Adelaide Street. It was built in the 1830s as part of the West Strand Improvements.

== History ==
The building was part of the West Strand Improvements, a scheme devised by William Lowther as Chief Commissioner of Woods and Forests and directed by James Pennethorne. The building was previously bisected east to west by Lowther Arcade, a popular shopping arcade which became well known in the Victorian era for its toyshops. The north block was also home to the Adelaide Gallery.

Its architectural design is broadly that of John Nash who was responsible for many of the West Strand Improvements, although the arcade that ran through it is broadly credited to Witherdon Young. The arcade was filled in between 1903 and 1904 with designs by John Macvicar Anderson, although these parts have since been replaced.

Coutts bank, considered one of the oldest surviving banks in London, was situated at 59 Strand for nearly two centuries before moving to their current site at 440 Strand in 1904. The glass frontage of Coutts bank along the Strand as well as the recreated Nash design on Adelaide street are 1970s additions.

In 2023, Marugame Udon opened a branch in the building which would be their 10th in the UK.

== Design ==
The majority of the building is of John Nash's typical Regency style. long unified stucco Italianate frontages with pilastered centrepieces. The corners are marked with towers, the south-west particularly pronounced by its two "pepper-pot" towers.

The glass frontage of Coutts as well as the extended interior is by Frederick Gibberd. The construction is often claimed as the first modern atrium building in Britain.

== See also ==
- Lowther Arcade
- Adelaide Gallery
