= The Marquis =

The Marquis may refer to:

- The Marquis (horse)
- The Marquis (comics)
- The Marquis (public house)
