= Adelaide Street, London =

Street in London, England

Coordinates: 51.508979°N 0.126004°W

Adelaide Street

Adelaide Street is a short street in London. It runs as a continuation of Chandos Place from William IV Street in the north to Duncannon Street in the South. The street is mostly pedestrianised with a short spur section at the top accessible to vehicles.

== History and description ==
The street was previously the area of a network of small alleys and courtyards around the church of St Martin-in-the-Fields. These were replaced by new roads in a scheme known as the West Strand Improvements spearheaded by William Lowther the Chief Commissioner of Woods and Forests. Laid out in the 1830s, the street is named for William IV's consort Adelaide of Saxe-Meiningen.

Also named for Queen Adelaide is the Adelaide Gallery which was held within 430–449 Strand, a block which occupies the eastern side of the street. In the centre was previously the western entrance of Lowther Arcade, a popular shopping arcade named for William Lowther. The 1998 sculptural work A Conversation with Oscar Wilde by Maggi Hambling stands at the southern end of the street. To the west of the street is the rear of St-Martin-in-the-Fields.
