= Alexander Milne =

Alexander Milne may refer to:

- Alexander Myln (1474-1548/9), Scottish abbot and judge
- Alexander Milne (entrepreneur) (1742–1838), Scottish-American entrepreneur
- Alexander Milne (civil servant) (died 1850), British civil servant
- Sir Alexander Milne, 1st Baronet (1806–1896), Royal Navy admiral
- Alexander Taylor Milne (1906–1994), English historian
- Alec Milne (Alexander Soutar Milne, born 1937), Scottish former professional footballer for Cardiff City
- Alec Milne (footballer, born 1889) (Alexander James Milne, 1889–1970), footballer for Doncaster Rovers and Stoke
- Alex Milne (artist), Canadian comic book artist

== See also ==
- A. A. Milne (Alan Alexander Milne, 1882–1956), English writer
