= Lowther Arcade =

Former shopping arcade in London

Coordinates: 51.509132°N 0.125639°W

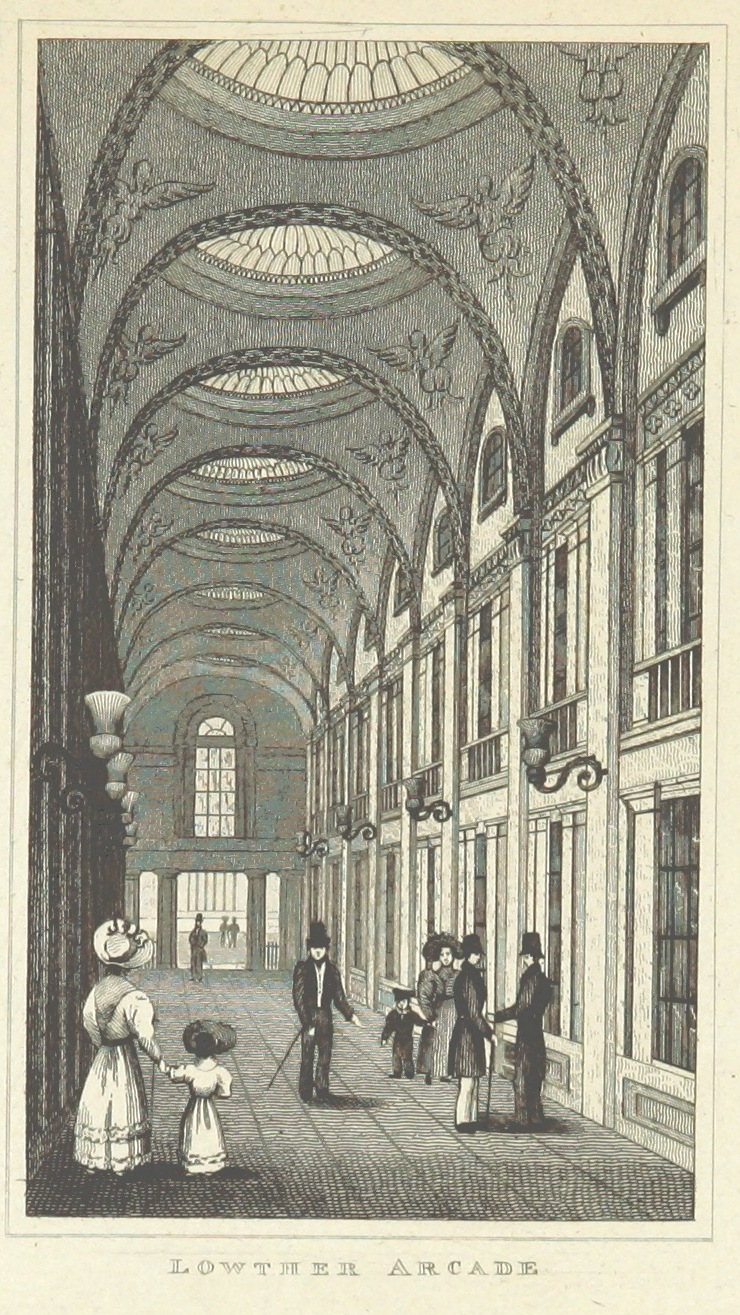
1834 Illustration of Lowther Arcade

Lowther Arcade was a shopping arcade that previously stood on the Strand. The arcade sat between the buildings of 430–449 Strand which has since infilled the arcade to create a single block, with the arcade closing in 1903. The arcade was well-known in the Victorian era and became popular, particularly for its toy shops, and was remembered as the subject of a number of popular songs from the period.

== History ==
The building was part of the West Strand Improvements, a scheme devised by William Lowther, for whom the arcade would be named, as Chief Commissioner of Woods and Forests and directed by James Pennethorne. While the buildings are generally credited to John Nash, as well as Robert Smirke, the arcade itself was designed by Witherdon Young. The arcade opened in 1832 and was widely successful, with Punch stating in 1834 that it was more popular than the Burlington Arcade. It was a popular destination, particularly among women and children, and was considered one of the "sights" of London.

The arcade was filled in between 1903 and 1904 with designs by John Macvicar Anderson for the new headquarters of Coutts, which had been at 59 Strand for the preceding 165 years. These parts have since been replaced by a redevelopment conducted for the bank by Frederick Gibberd which produced what is often claimed as the first modern atrium building in Britain.

== Description ==
The arcade ran east to west for 250ft between the blocks of what is now the single block 430–449 Strand. It connected the Strand to Adelaide Street and was flanked to its north by the Adelaide Gallery. The arcade was a tall corridor with domed roof skylights with shops along the interior. The architect possibly took inspiration from Sir John Soane's design of the Bank of England.

The arcade would be the subject of or featured in a number of works and songs from the Victorian period, including W. S. Gilbert's pantomime Hush-a-Bye, Baby, On the Tree Top, or, Harlequin Fortunia, King Frog of Frog Island, and the Magic Toys of Lowther Arcade.

== See also ==
- 430–449 Strand
- Adelaide Gallery
- Burlington Arcade
- Piccadilly Arcade
- Victoria Station Arcade
- Quadrant Arcade
- Great Victorian Way
