= Scarsdale Tavern =

Pub in Kensington, London, England

The Scarsdale Tavern
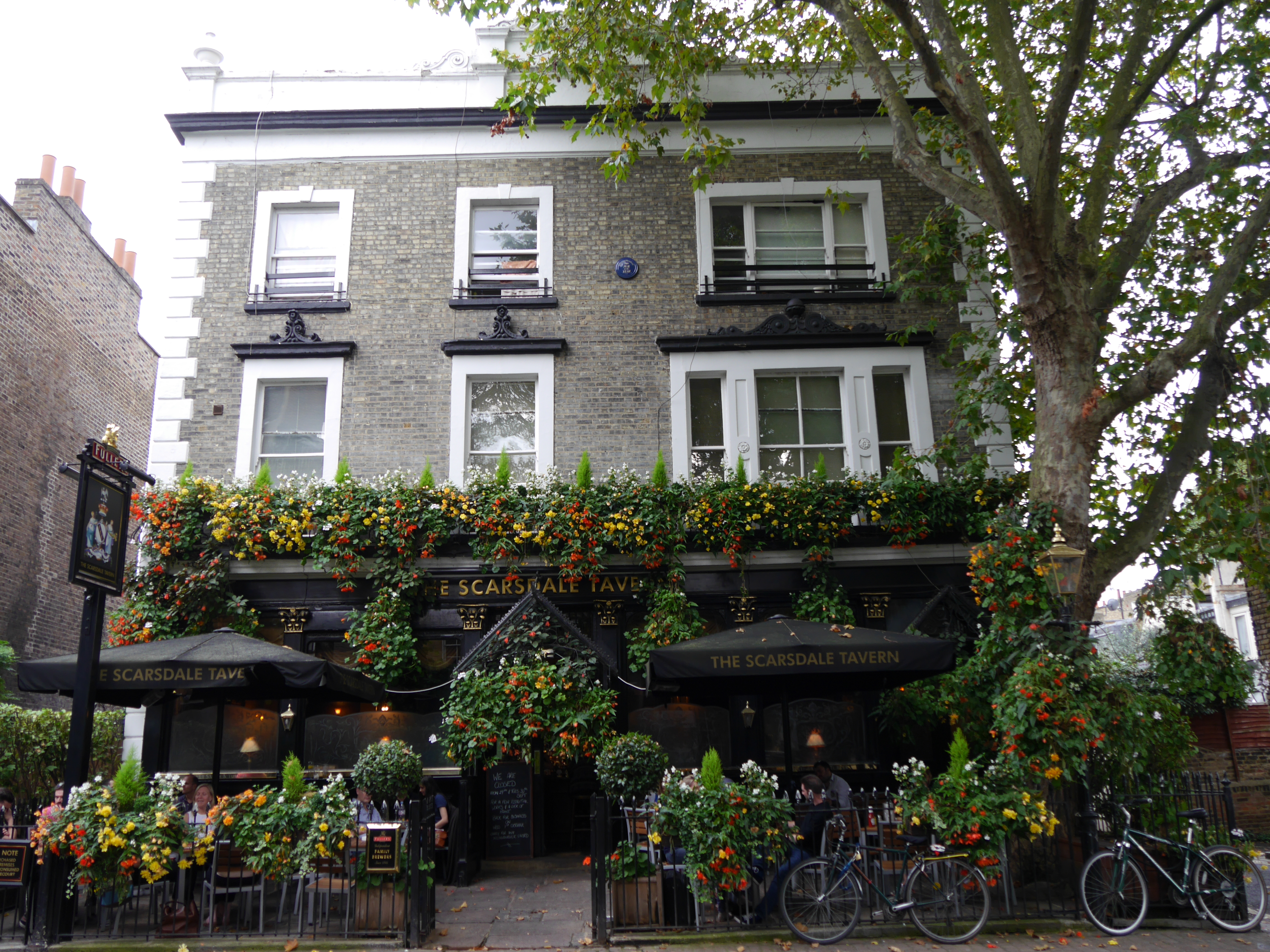
- The Scarsdale Tavern

- Location within Royal Borough of Kensington and Chelsea Location within Greater London

General information
- Location: 23a Edwardes Square, Kensington, London, England
- Coordinates: 51.497112°N 0.199042°W

The Scarsdale Tavern is a public house at 23a Edwardes Square, Kensington, London W8 6HE.

It won the Evening Standard Pub of the Year award in 1989. Writing in 2010, The Evening Standard called it "definitely a cut above most of the nearby pubs".
