= Edwardes Square =

Garden square in Kensington, London, England

Coordinates: 51.497191°N 0.200682°W

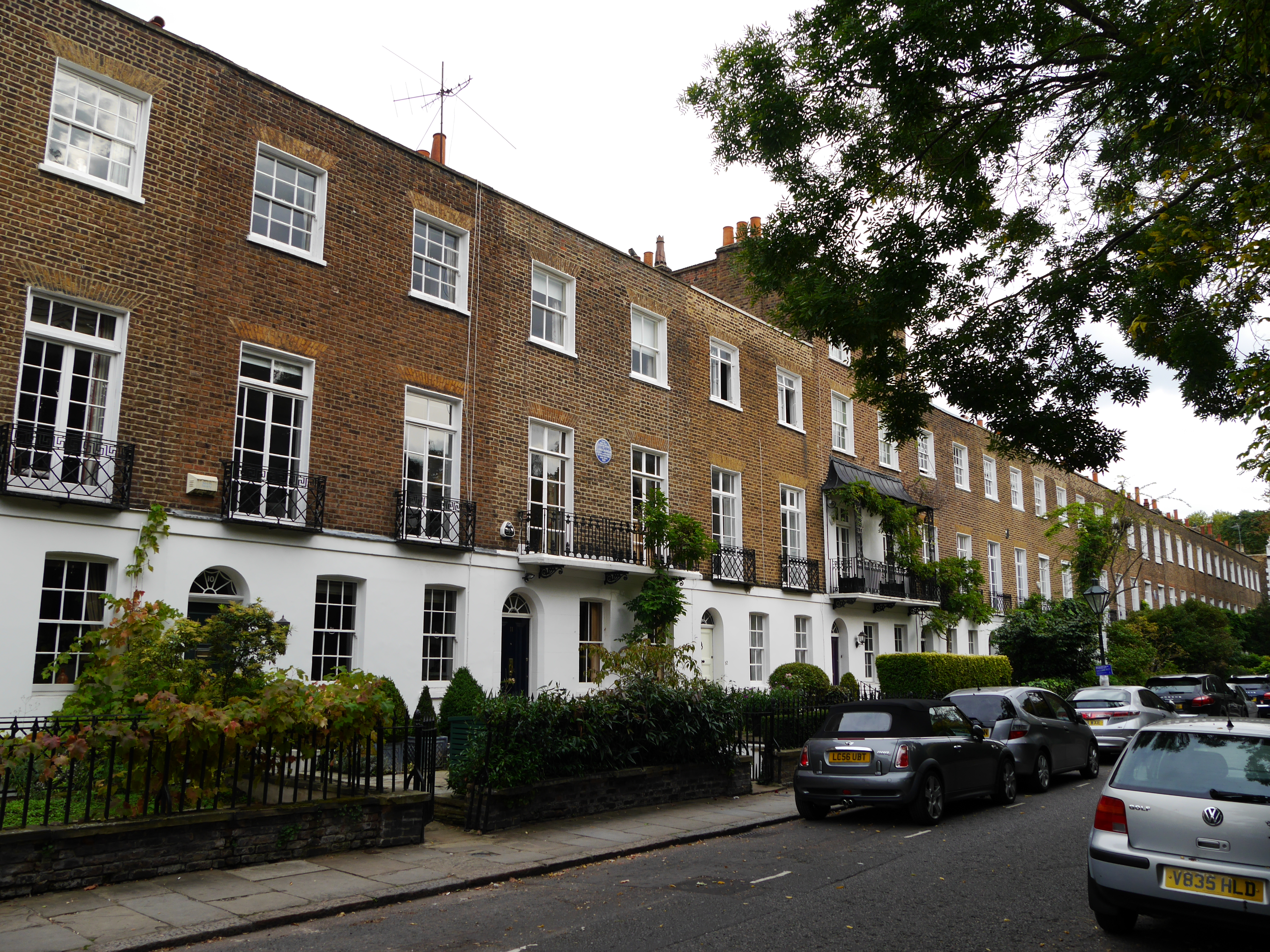
Edwardes Square

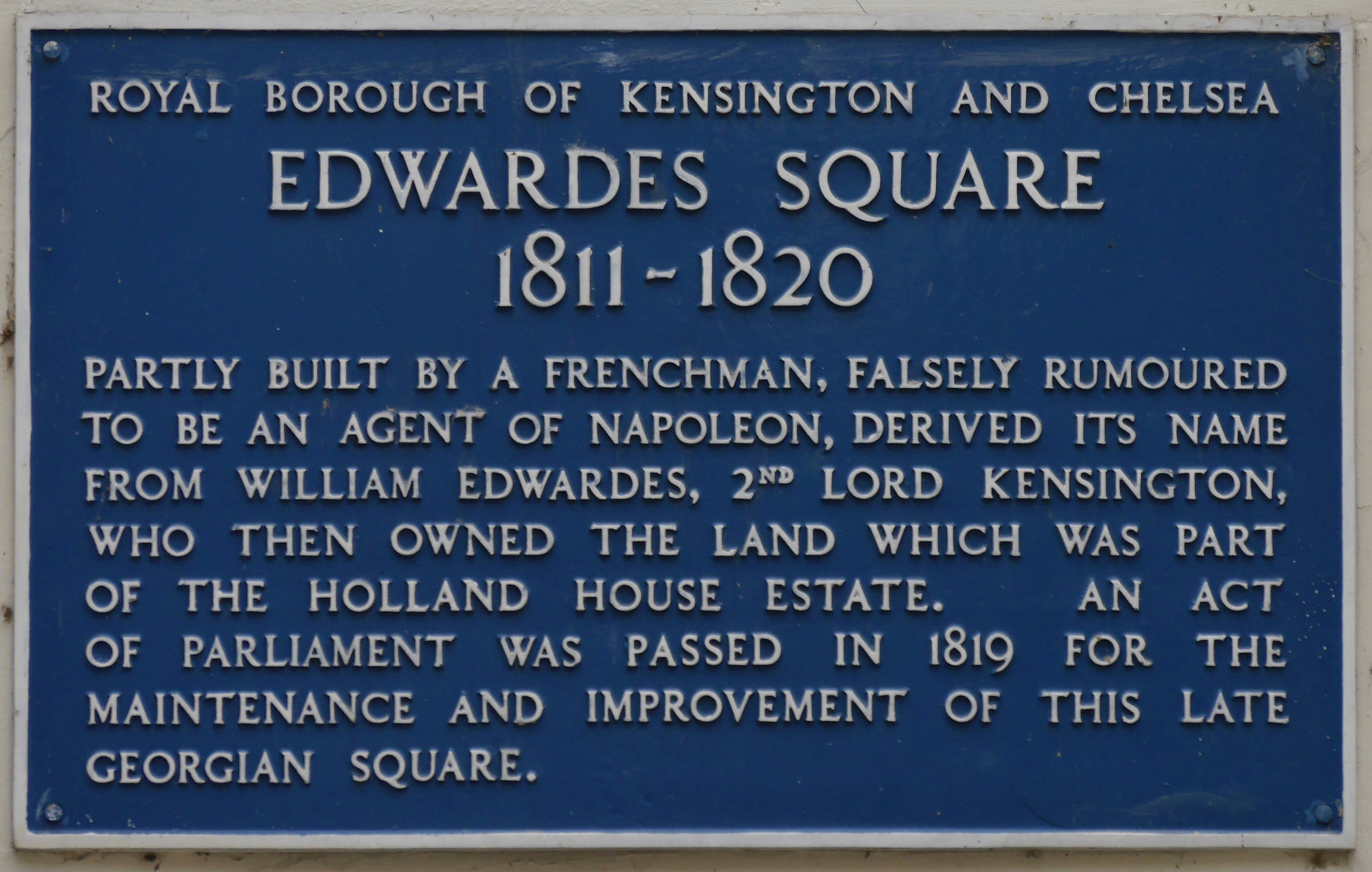
Edwardes Square plaque

Edwardes Square is a garden square in Kensington, London, W8. The square was built between 1811 and 1820. 1–23 and 25–48 Edwardes Square are listed Grade II for their architectural merit.

== Gardens ==
The communal gardens were laid out in 1820 and are 1.215 hectares (3.00 acres) in size. The gardens are Grade II* listed on the Register of Historic Parks and Gardens, and are maintained under the Kensington Improvement Act 1851 (14 & 15 Vict. c. cxvi). They are not open to the public.

== Notable residents ==
- No. 1: G. K. Chesterton (1874–1936) resided here for a brief period after his marriage to Frances in 1901
- No. 11: the London home of the author and humanist Goldsworthy Lowes Dickinson (1862–1932).
- No. 15: Agostino Agliothe, Italian artist and decorator, lived here between 1814 and 1820.
- No 16: Sir Roger Bannister (the first man to break the four minute mile) lived here.
- No 19: the Italian poet Ugo Foscolo lived here between 1817 and 1818.
- No 27: Comedian Frankie Howerd lived here from 1966 until his death in 1992.
- No 59:
  - Artist Frank Cadogan Cowper lived here in Studio 2, between 1909 and 1924.
  - Pianist and composer Helen Pyke lived here in Studio 4, in the mid-1930s.

The Scarsdale Tavern is a pub at no. 23A.
