= The Hope, Carshalton =

Pub in Carshalton, London

- Exterior view

- Location within London Borough of Sutton Location within Greater London

General information
- Location: 48 West Street, Carshalton, London, England
- Coordinates: 51.36705°N 0.167155°W

Website
- hopecarshalton.co.uk

The Hope, Carshalton is a pub in Carshalton, London. Since 2010 it has been operated by a community group of shareholders, who also bought the freehold in 2016.

It has won several awards, including CAMRA's award for London pub of the year in 2025. It has a policy of not playing any music on speakers. As of 2025 it was owned by 46 shareholders; to set a goal of safeguarding it as a long-term community asset holdings were capped at a maximum of 24% per shareholder.
