= Parliament Street from Trafalgar Square =

Early daguerreotype of London

Coordinates: 51.507503°N 0.128014°W

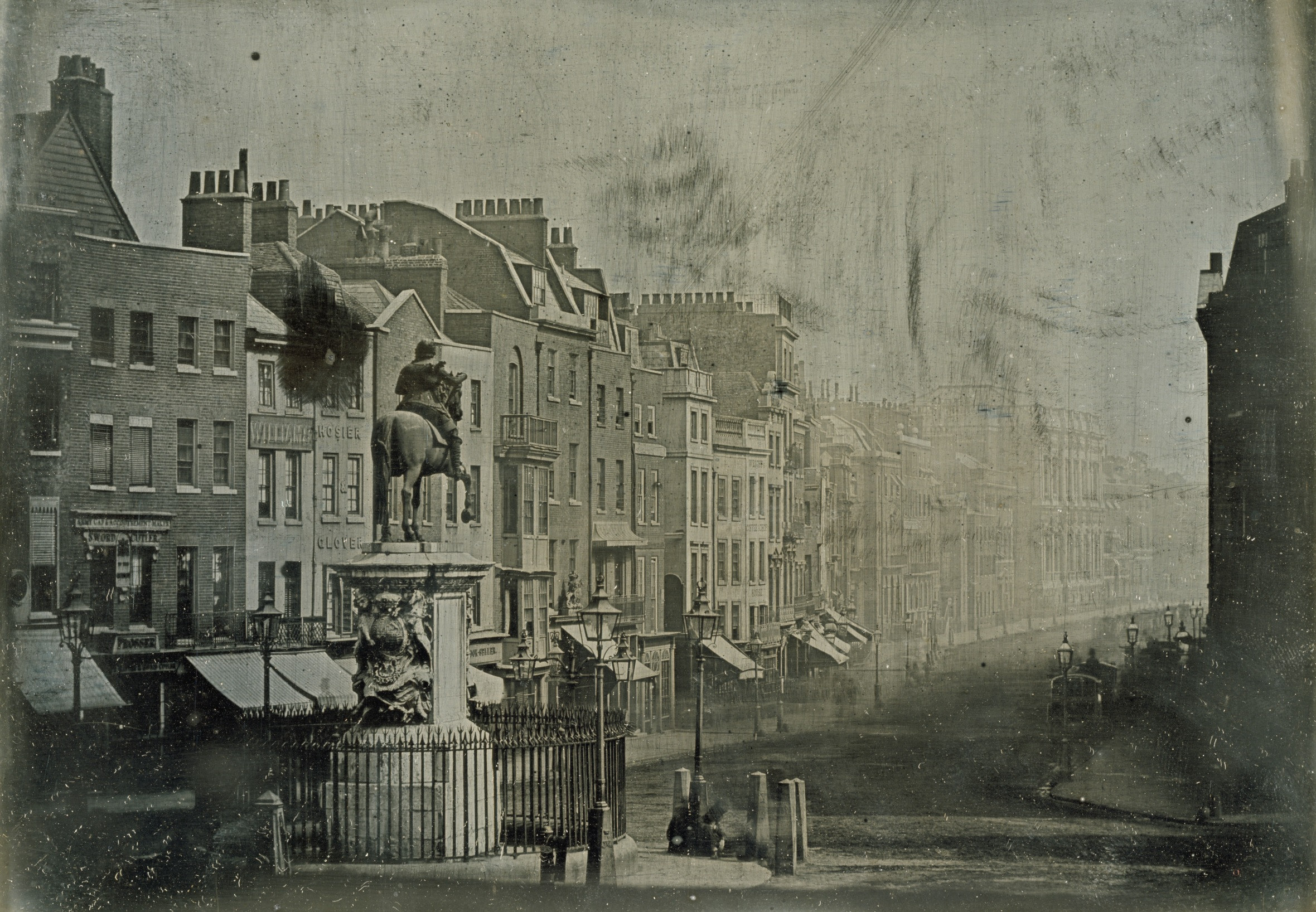
Parliament Street from Trafalgar Square, the image, reversed in the process, has been corrected to the real-life orientation

Parliament Street from Trafalgar Square is a surviving early daguerreotype taken in 1839 in London. It is possibly the earliest surviving photograph of the city.

== Background ==
Following Louis Daguerre's invention of the eponymous daguerreotype, the method was announced worldwide in August 1839. Subsequently, a Monsieur de St Croix, of which little is known, began publicly demonstrating the method in London, including at the Argyll Rooms and prominently at Adelaide Gallery in September, within a week of the first demonstrations by Daguerre himself in Paris on the 7th. Newspapers at the time also reported similar demonstrations by J. T. Cooper at the Royal Polytechnic Institution.

== Description ==
The photograph depicts a view down Whitehall from Trafalgar Square with the Equestrian Statue of Charles I in the foreground. Despite the long exposure time, small boys and a cab driver stayed long enough to be picked up around the statue. The Banqueting House can also be seen, with little else shown in the photo surviving today. Due to the nature of the process, the image's scene is reversed.

The photograph is, according to R. Derek Wood, one of three survivors from these early demonstrations, all three taken around Trafalgar Square and generally credited to St Croix. It survives alongside St Martin's Spire and View of the National Gallery both in the Science Museum's collection. Parliament Street from Trafalgar Square is possibly the oldest depicting London, and almost certainly the oldest photograph in the Victoria & Albert Museum's collection.

In 1972, The photograph was displayed at an Arts Council Exhibition at the V&A alongside four other daguerreotypes credited to St Croix. Alongside it were the two photographs which were acquired by the Science Museum the next year as well as two taken at Rouen.

== See also ==
- History of photography
