= The Marquis, London =

Public house in London

The Marquis

General information
- Type: Public house
- Location: London, England
- Coordinates: 51°30′35″N 0°07′32″W
- Completed: c. 1850

Listed Building – Grade II
- Official name: Marquis of Granby Public House
- Designated: 15 January 1973
- Reference no.: 1066313

The Marquis formerly the Marquis of Granby, a common name for public houses, is a Grade II listed public house on Chandos Place in the Covent Garden area of London.

== History and description ==
The pub opened in the 1850s on a site previously occupied by the Hole-in-the-Wall, the inn where highwayman Claude Duval was arrested. Its design is mostly of stock brick in a Georgian style. Nikolaus Pevsner describes it as a combination of "Nash and Gothick motifs", referring to the main frontage likely being inspired by the works of John Nash who produced buildings nearby and the corner's pointed arches.

The pub closed in 2005, acquired in June 2007 by the Morton-Scott Pub Company and reopened in 2007 under the new name The Marquis.

== See also ==
- The Harp
