= National Gallery of Practical Sciences =

Former shopping arcade in London

Coordinates: 51.509364°N 0.125205°W

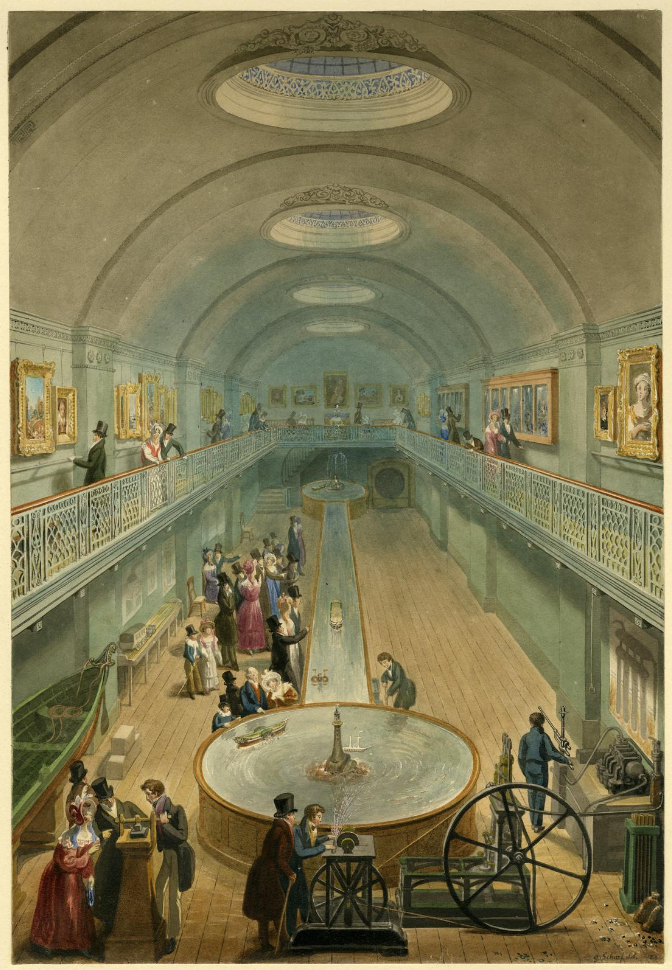
1832 watercolour by George Scharf depicting the Long Room of the Adelaide Gallery. The popular attraction of Jacob Perkins' steam gun is visible in the foreground.

The National Gallery of Practical Science known popularly as the Adelaide Gallery was a gallery in London. It was opened as a space dedicated to demonstrating scientific instruments and machines in the 1830s later being used as an amusement hall and in the Royal Marionette Theatre. It stood on the north side of the Lowther Arcade, a shopping arcade which cut through the buildings now known collectively as 430–449 Strand.

== History ==
The gallery was built as part of the West Strand Improvements, a scheme devised by William Lowther, for whom Lowther Arcade was named, as Chief Commissioner of Woods and Forests and directed by James Pennethorne. The building housing the gallery was the work of John Nash while the arcade was designed by Witherdon Young.

The gallery was devised by Jacob Perkins, first as a place to display his own inventions but later for all new inventions. It opened in 1830 and named to honour Queen Adelaide, consort of William IV, established by the Society for the Illustration and Encouragement of Practical Science. It was incorporated by Royal Charter in October 1834.

Perkins' steam gun was among the most popular attractions. The gallery was also used by pioneers in photography, hosting the first photographic studios in England, including that of Antoine Claudet. It also saw the 1839 demonstrations of the newly announced daguerreotype process by a Monseiur de St Croix, of which little is known. Parliament Street from Trafalgar Square a photograph taken nearby as part of the demonstrations in that year is considered to be the oldest surviving of London. Despite its popularity, the gallery by 1838 began to struggle, with competition from the Polytechnic Institution a major challenge. Throughout the 1830s, the gallery saw fewer scientific displays and was used more for entertainment. It closed in 1845, the space opening as Laurent's casino the following year, an entertainment hall which has been described as "London's first nightclub".

== See also ==
- 430–449 Strand
- Lowther Arcade
