= Duke of Cumberland, Fulham =

1892 pub in London, England

Coordinates: 51.472567°N 0.199923°W

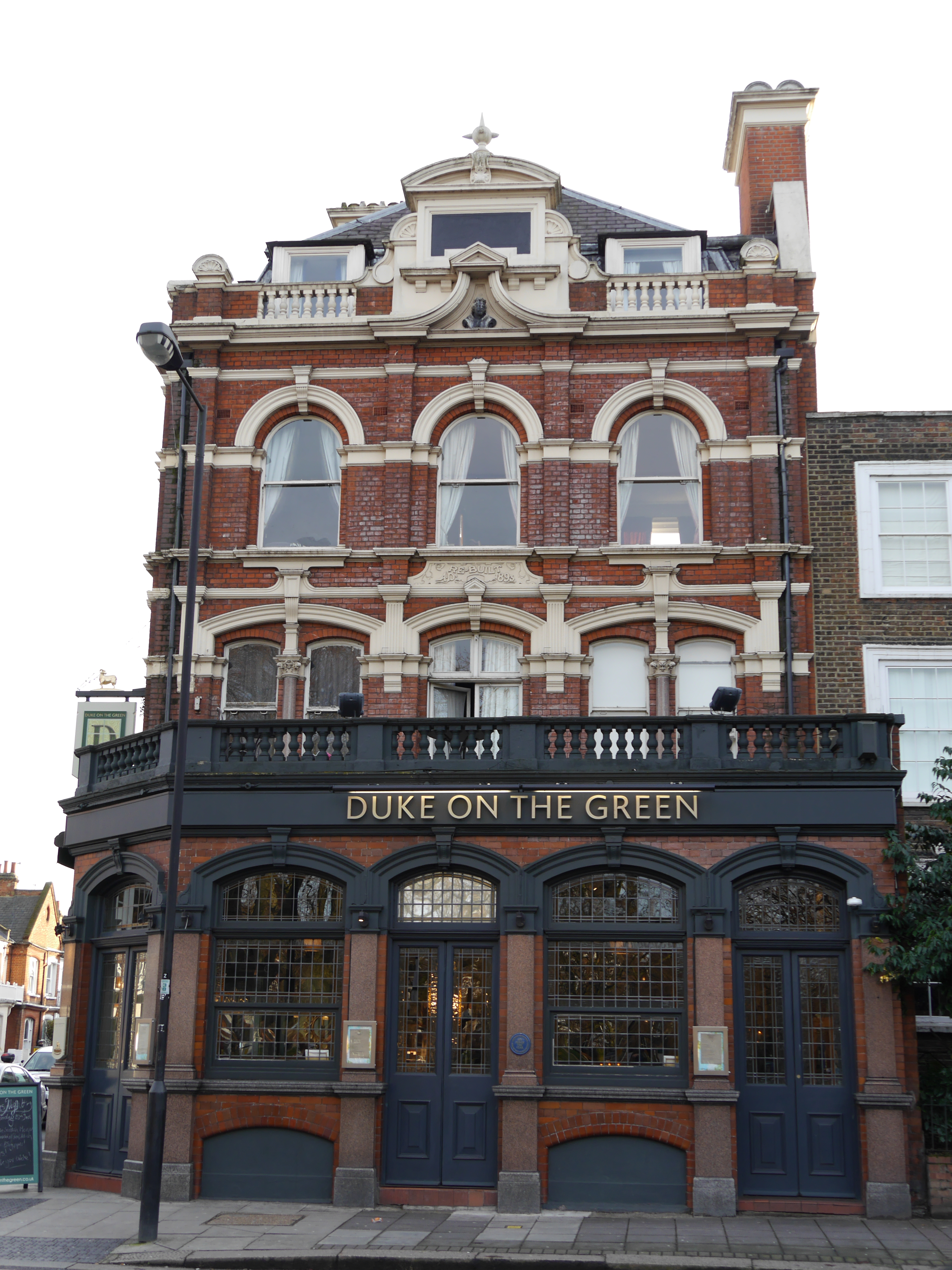
Duke of Cumberland, 2014

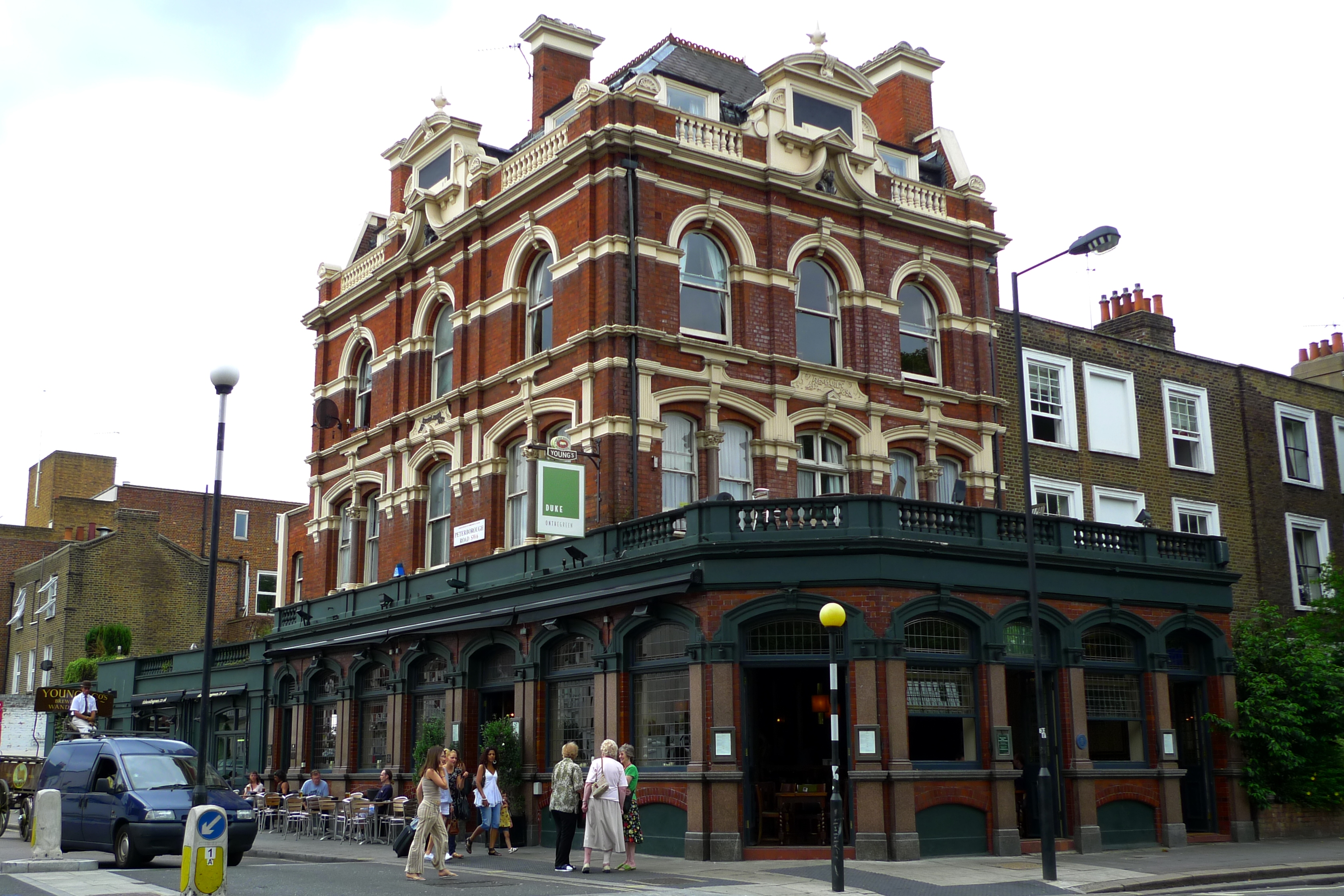
Duke of Cumberland, 2009

The Duke Of Cumberland is a Grade II listed public house at 235 New King's Road, Fulham, London.

It was built in 1892, and the architect was Robert J Cruwys.

It now trades as "The Duke on the Green", and is part of the Young's pub chain.
