= Blythe Hill Tavern =

Listed pub in Forest Hill, London, England

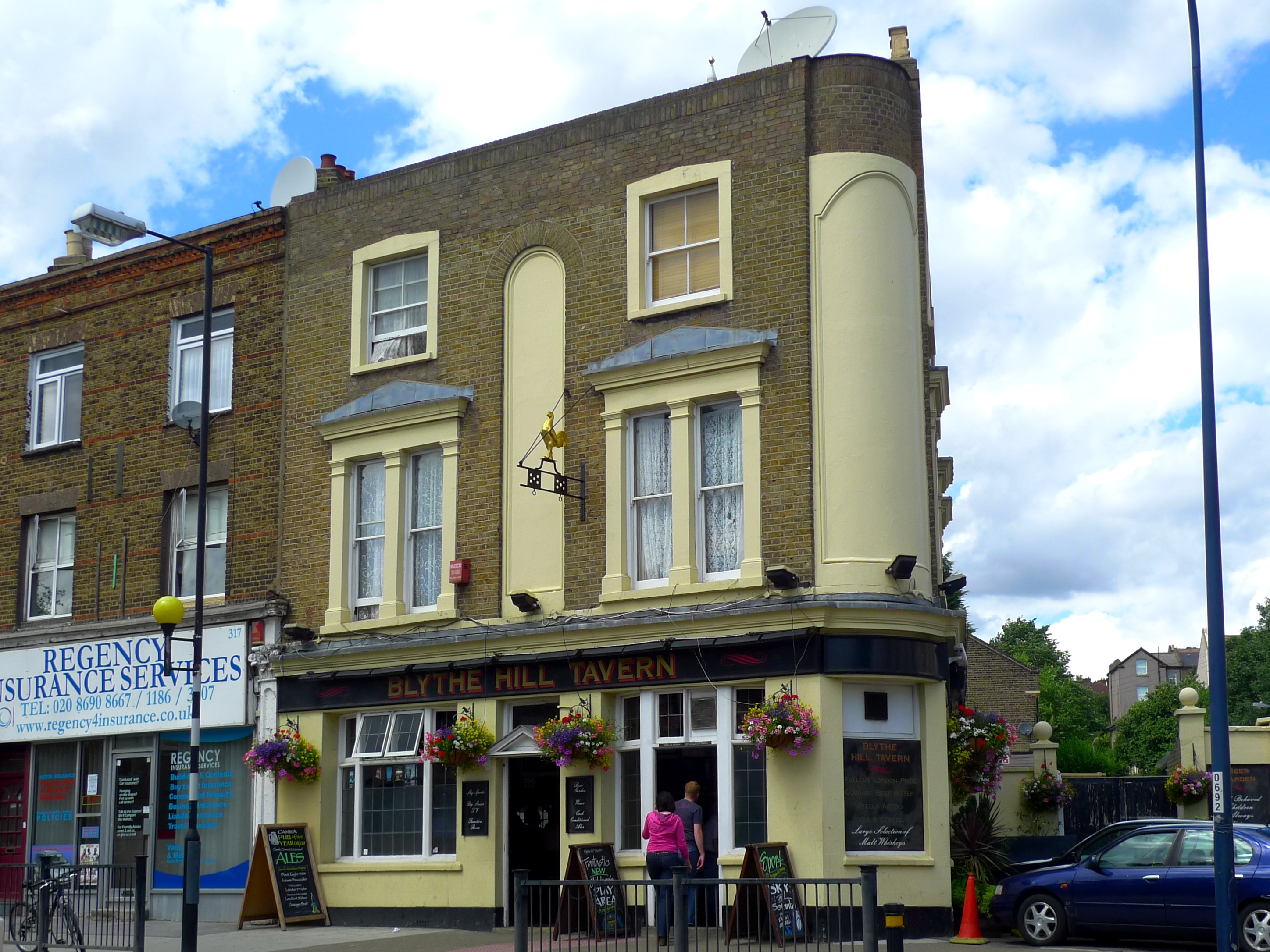
- The pub in 2009
- Former names: Blythe Hill Hotel

General information
- Type: Public house
- Architectural style: Brewer's Tudor
- Location: 319 Stanstead Road, Forest Hill, London, England
- Coordinates: 51.44235°N 0.03378°W
- Year built: c. 1866; 160 years ago (probable)
- Renovated: 1920s or 1930s (refurbished)
- Owner: Stonegate

Design and construction
- Designations

Listed Building – Grade II
- Official name: Blythe Hill Tavern and attached gate piers and walls
- Designated: 7 June 2022
- Reference no.: 1475999

Website
- Official website

The Blythe Hill Tavern is a Grade II listed public house on Stanstead Road in Forest Hill, London, England. Probably built around 1866, it was refurbished internally in the 1920s or 1930s in the Brewer's Tudor style and was known as the Blythe Hill Hotel until the 1940s. The Campaign for Real Ale (CAMRA) includes the pub on its National Inventory of Historic Pub Interiors and rates it three stars, denoting an interior of "outstanding national historic importance".

== History ==
The public house was probably built around 1866 and refurbished internally in the 1920s or 1930s in the Brewer's Tudor style. It was known as the Blythe Hill Hotel until the 1940s.

A small snug formerly occupied the rear of the public bar and was accessed through what are now sealed double doors. The space was altered in the 1960s when the dividing wall was repositioned.

On 7 June 2022, the Blythe Hill Tavern was designated a Grade II listed building, one of eleven pubs in England recognised for the significance of their interiors. It is regarded by the Campaign for Real Ale (CAMRA) as having an interior of "outstanding national historic importance" and is rated three stars on its National Inventory of Historic Pub Interiors.

The pub was managed by Con Riordan for several decades and, by 2018, he had served as licensee for around 30 years. According to CAMRA, the Blythe Hill Tavern changed hands in February or March 2025 following his departure. The pub has been included in several lists of London's leading pubs, including one published by Time Out in 2023. As of October 2026, the freehold is owned by Stonegate Pub Company.

== Architecture ==
=== Exterior ===
The three-storey pub occupies a corner site, with an angled frontage to Stanstead Road and a rounded corner leading into Blythe Hill Lane. Built of yellow brick with a slate roof, it retains traces of earlier ground-floor tiling beneath later rendering. Two floors of accommodation are located above.

The exterior is distinguished by projecting ground-floor windows and panelled entrances dating from the interwar period, together with decorative detailing to the upper-storey windows and large rendered panels on the main frontage and rounded corner. A bracket bearing a golden cockerel survives as a reminder of the former pub sign. A moulded cornice and fascia run around the building at first-floor level, while the hipped roof, largely hidden behind a parapet, is punctuated by five chimney stacks and includes modern rooflights and dormer additions.

The Blythe Hill Lane elevation follows the design of the main frontage on a simpler scale, while the rear elevation overlooks the pub garden. Here, upper-floor sash windows light the rear rooms, and single-storey additions containing toilet facilities project from the ground floor beneath a gabled roof end.

Along the east side of the site, a rendered wall and gateway provide access to the beer garden. Although the timber gate is a later replacement, the flanking walls and gate piers, topped with ball finials, date from the original construction of the pub.

=== Interior ===
The ground floor is arranged around three main rooms, with bars to either side and a larger lounge at the rear, all served by a central bar area whose unusual layout allows customers to pass through it between rooms. The interior was extensively remodelled during the interwar period in a mock Tudor style that remains evident throughout the three principal bar areas. Decorative ceiling beams and imitation timber wall finishes are used throughout. The wall treatment combines moulded timber detailing with embossed panels designed to resemble wood.

The lounge bar retains a fireplace with a decorative metal hood, while the saloon bar contains a tiled fireplace featuring a painted sailing ship. Timber bar-back fittings survive in the public and saloon bars, with arched detailing and mirrored panels. The bar counters, which have panelled fronts and curved ends, are largely original, although part of the saloon bar counter has been extended. A carved timber screen separates a seating area in the lounge bar from the side entrance.

The toilet facilities are housed in single-storey rear additions and are reached from the lounge bar. Behind the saloon bar, a staircase rises to the upper floors, passing above part of the bar area. The former rooms on the first and second floors have since been converted into residential accommodation.
