= Alexander Milne (civil servant) =

British civil servant

- Died: 1861
- Occupation: Civil Servant

Alexander Milne CB (fl 1818, died 3 April 1861) was a British civil servant who worked as a Commissioner of Woods and Forests for many years.

Born in Rhynie, Aberdeenshire, on 14 July 1779, son of Rev James Milne, Minister of Rhynie and his wife Jane/Jean Milne. Milne first became a commissioner on 14 August 1834 when William IV appointed him a "Commissioner of His Majesty's Woods, Forests, Land Revenues, and Buildings". The commission was a three-man body which managed the public and commercial functions of Crown land in Britain. The commission was composed of a First Commissioner, who headed the body, and two co-commissioners. Throughout his career with the commission, which ran from 1834 until his death in 1850, Milne served as a co-commissioner. On his first commission Milne worked with Sir John Hobhouse, the First Commissioner, and Sir Benjamin Charles Stephenson. Milne was reappointed to the commission, which had changed its remit to "Woods, Forests, Land Revenues, Works, and Public Buildings", by the King on 23 December 1834. Stephenson remained on the commission but Lord Granville Somerset was appointed as the new First Commissioner.

Milne and Stephenson reappointed once more on 28 April 1835, with Viscount Duncannon serving as First Commissioner. This composition was retained until 14 June 1839 when Charles Alexander Gore was appointed by Queen Victoria to replace Stephenson. The commission's title was changed to the "Commission of Woods, Forests, Land Revenues, Works, and Buildings", the last time it would change during Milne's life. Milne and Gore were reappointed on 16 September 1841 with the Earl of Lincoln replacing Duncannon at the head. Milne and Gore were once again reappointed on 2 March 1846 with Viscount Canning as First Commissioner. Milne was appointed to the commission for the last time on 7 July 1846, with Gore returning as a co-commissioner and Viscount Morpeth as First Commissioner.

Milne retired in 1850 and died on 3 April 1861 at 29 St James' Place, London, having served on the commission for 16 consecutive years of its 41-year existence. Milne served with six different First Commissioners and just two separate co-commissioners. His replacement on the commission was Thomas Francis Kennedy who was appointed on 28 August 1850.

Milne was appointed to be a member of the Improvement of the Metropolis Commission on 30 November 1842. This commission, whose members did not receive a salary, sat from 1842 to 1851 and was tasked with "enquiring into and considering the most effectual means of improving the metropolis, and of providing increased facilities of communication within the same". The commission was composed of some of the leading architects and politicians of the time. Milne sat on the commission alongside the Earl of Lincoln and Gore as well as Lord Lyttelton, Lord Colborne, James Charles Herries, Sir Robert Harry Inglis, Sir Charles Lemon, Henry Thomas Hope, Henry Gally Knight, Robert Smirke and Charles Barry.

On 27 April 1848 Milne was appointed a Companion of the Order of the Bath (Civil Division) for his work as a commissioner of woods and forests. He was a friend of Charles Babbage and William Huskisson and some of his correspondence with those men, and others, is held by The National Archives. He was also close to the architect and civil engineer Thomas Telford and, along with John Dickinson (of the House of Commons), served as executor of his last will and testament after his death in 1834.
