= The Harp =

Pub in Covent Garden, London

Coordinates: 51.509638°N 0.126062°W

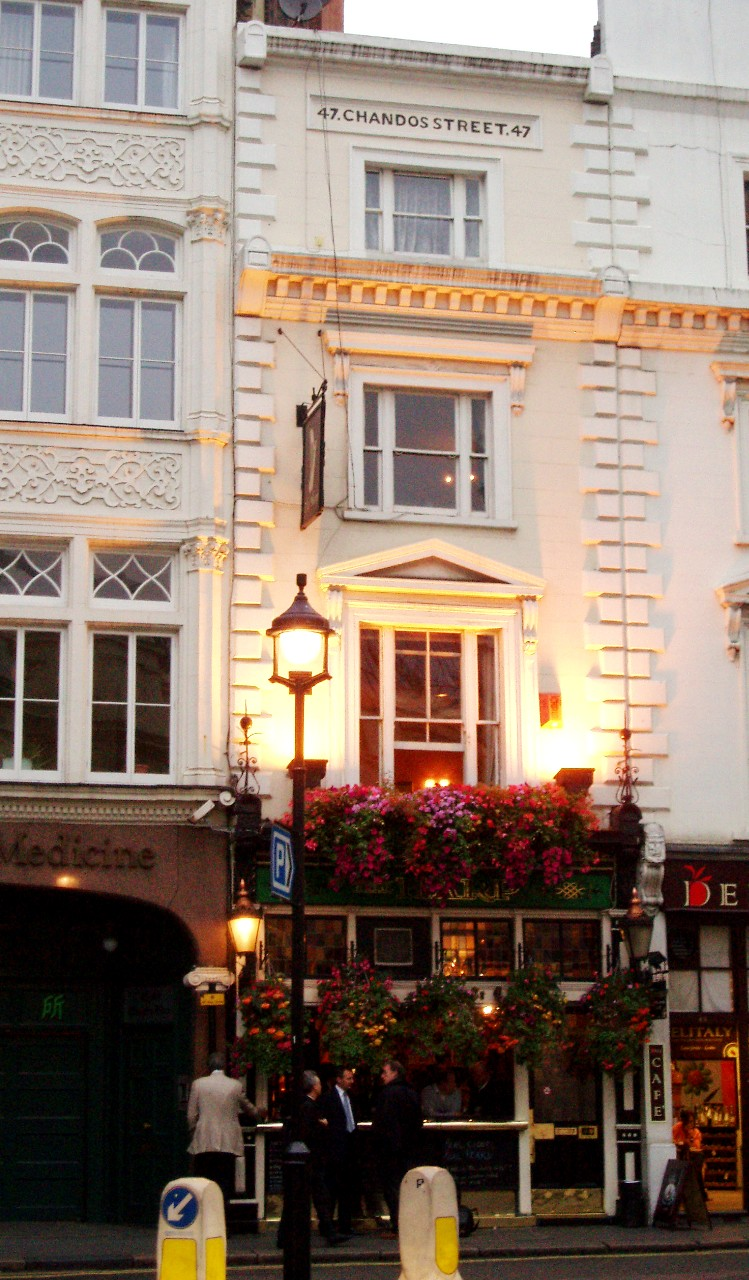
The Harp

The Harp is a public house at 47 Chandos Place, Covent Garden, London, WC2N 4HS.

It was The Welsh Harp until 1995, when it was taken over by an Irish woman Binnie Walsh, who subsequently bought the pub. The pub was subsequently sold to Fuller's in 2014.

In 2008 it was selected as the Society for the Preservation of Beers from the Wood's London Pub of the Year.

In early 2011, it became the first pub in London to receive the ultimate accolade of being "National Pub of the Year 2010" by the Campaign for Real Ale (CAMRA).

Since then it was voted as the local CAMRA branch's Pub of the Year in every even year, being not eligible to enter in the odd years after such wins.

The building is on a narrow plot with a flight of stairs leading to an upstairs room and the toilets.
