= Charing Cross Police Station =

Police station in London

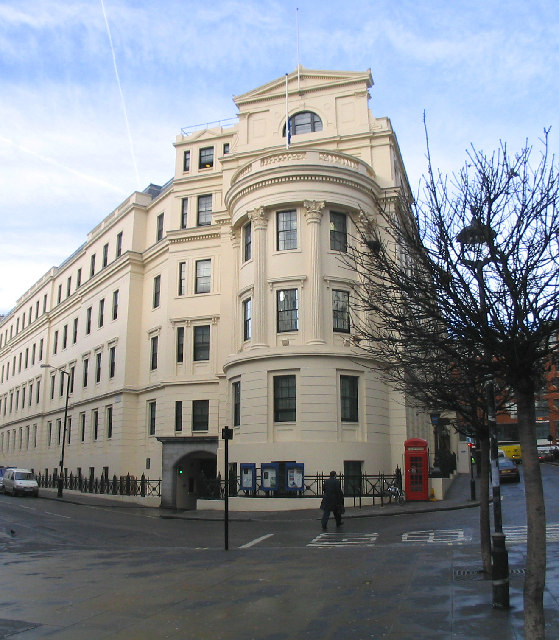

General information
- Location: Charing Cross, London, England
- Coordinates: 51.5097°N 0.1250°W
- Construction started: 15 September 1831
- Completed: January 1834
- Opened: 10 February 1834 (as Charing Cross Hospital)
- Owner: Metropolitan Police

Design and construction
- Architect: Decimus Burton

Charing Cross Police Station is a Metropolitan Police Service station in London's Charing Cross area. Its site in Agar Street was formerly the main site of Charing Cross Hospital. The station, UK's busiest, comprises two individually listed Grade II listed buildings.

== History ==
Starting in 2018, a series of investigations known collectively as Operation Hotton were carried out by the Metropolitan Police regarding activities of officers based mostly at Charing Cross Police Station. These were unified into a single investigation by the Independent Office for Police Conduct. Following the IOPC's findings of multiple cases of bullying, harassment and sexual harassment, the Metropolitan Police accepted the recommendations made by the IOPC.

An undercover Panorama investigation released in 2025 showed officers at Charing Cross Police Station displaying racist and misogynistic attitudes and bragging about the use of excessive force. In response to the programme's findings, the Metropolitan Police suspended eight officers and one staff member, took two officers off of frontline duties, and referred the matter to the IOPC. Commissioner Mark Rowley said the documented behaviour was "totally unacceptable and contrary to the values and standards" of the police force. As a result of the investigation, seven officers were dismissed from the force for gross misconduct and the custody team at Charing Cross was disbanded.

== Facilities ==
The station has two armouries for storage of police firearms and ammunition.
