= Strand, London =

Major thoroughfare in the City of Westminster, London, England

Strand
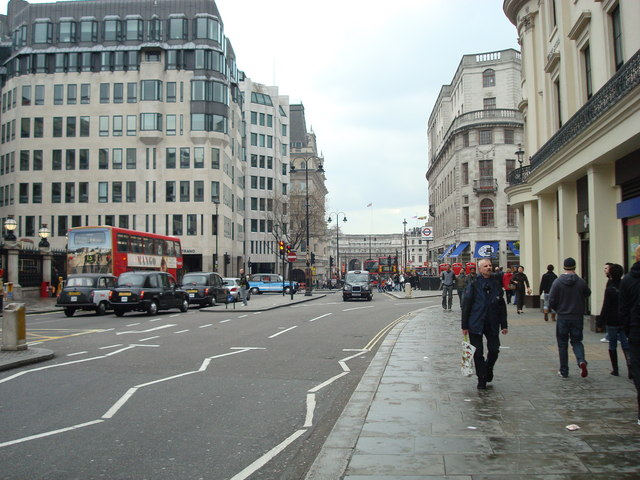
- Strand at Charing Cross in April 2008, looking towards Trafalgar Square and Admiralty Arch

- Location within City of Westminster
- Part of: A4
- Maintained by: Transport for London
- Length: 0.8 mi (1.3 km)
- Postal code: WC2
- Nearest Tube station: Charing Cross; Temple
- Coordinates: 51.5114°N 0.1190°W

The Strand (commonly referred to with a leading "The", but formally without (Note: The official documentation from Westminster City Council calls the road simply "Strand", as do the street name signs. ("Strand Detail" (PDF). Westminster City Council. Archived from the original (PDF) on 13 January 2016.) But in colloquial speech it is normally "the Strand", especially after prepositions such as "to", "on", or "from".)) is a major street in the City of Westminster, Central London. The street, which is part of London's West End theatreland, runs just over 3/4 mile (1.2 km) from Trafalgar Square eastwards to Temple Bar, where it becomes Fleet Street in the City of London, and is part of the A4, a main road running west from central London.

The road's name comes from the Old English strond, meaning the beach or edge of a river, as it historically ran alongside the north bank of the River Thames. The river side of the street was home to grand houses, interspersed with slum alleys, between the 12th and 17th centuries. Mansions of historical importance built between the Strand and the river included Essex House, Arundel House, Old Somerset House, Savoy Palace, Durham House, York House and Cecil House, none of which survive. The aristocracy moved to the West End during the 17th century, and the Strand became known for its coffee shops, restaurants and taverns. The street was a centre point for theatre and music hall during the 19th century, and several venues have survived to the current day.

At the east end of the street are two English Baroque churches: St Mary le Strand by James Gibbs and St Clement Danes by Christopher Wren. This easternmost stretch of the Strand is also home to King's College, one of the two founding colleges of the University of London. Other notable structures include the Royal Courts of Justice and Australia House.

Several authors, poets and philosophers have lived on or near the Strand, including Charles Dickens, Ralph Waldo Emerson and Virginia Woolf.

== Geography ==
The street is the main link between the two cities of Westminster and London. It runs eastward from Trafalgar Square, parallel to the River Thames, to Temple Bar which is the boundary between the two cities at this point; the road ahead being Fleet Street. Traffic travelling eastbound follows a short crescent around Aldwych, connected at both ends to the Strand. The road marks the southern boundary of the Covent Garden district and forms part of the Northbank business improvement district.

The name was first recorded in 1002 as strondway, then in 1185 as Stronde and in 1220 as la Stranda. It is formed from the Old English word "strond", meaning the edge of a river. Initially it referred to the shallow bank of the once much wider Thames, before the construction of the Victoria Embankment. The name was later applied to the road itself. In the 13th century it was known as "Densemanestret" or "street of the Danes", referring to the community of Danes in the area.

Two London Underground stations were once named Strand: a Piccadilly line station (which was renamed Aldwych station) that operated between 1907 and 1994 and a former Northern line station which today forms part of Charing Cross station. "Strand Bridge" was the name given to Waterloo Bridge during its construction; it was renamed for its official opening on the second anniversary of the coalition victory in the Battle of Waterloo. London buses routes 23, 139 and 176 all run along the Strand, as do numerous night bus services.

== History ==
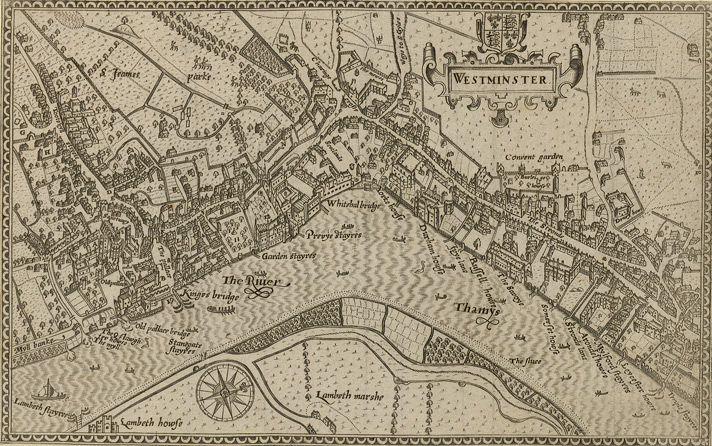
This 1593 map shows "The Strande" as the principal route – parallel to the River, from the City in the east, to Whitehall in the west

During Roman Britain, what is now the Strand was part of the route to Silchester, known as "Iter VIII" on the Antonine Itinerary, and which later became known by the name Akeman Street. It was briefly part of a trading town called Lundenwic that developed around 600 AD, and stretched from Trafalgar Square to Aldwych. Alfred the Great gradually moved the settlement into the old Roman town of Londinium from around 886 AD onwards, leaving no mark of the old town, and the area returned to fields.

In the Middle Ages, the Strand became the principal route between the separate settlements of the City of London (the civil and commercial centre) and the royal Palace of Westminster (the national political centre). In the archaeological record, there is considerable evidence of occupation to the north of Aldwych, but much along the former foreshore has been covered by rubble from the demolition of the Tudor Somerset Place, a former royal residence, to create a large platform for the building of the first Somerset House, in the 17th century. The landmark Eleanor's Cross was built in the 13th century at the western end of the Strand at Charing Cross by Edward I commemorating his wife Eleanor of Castile. It was demolished in 1647 by the request of Parliament during the First English Civil War, but reconstructed in 1865.

The west part of the Strand was in the parish of St Martin in the Fields and in the east it extended into the parishes of St Clement Danes and St Mary le Strand. Most of its length was in the Liberty of Westminster, although part of the eastern section in St Clement Danes was in the Ossulstone hundred of Middlesex. The Strand was the northern boundary of the precinct of the Savoy, which was approximately where the approach to Waterloo Bridge is now. All of these parishes and places became part of the Strand District in 1855, except St Martin in the Fields which was governed separately. The Strand District Board of Works was based at No. 22, Tavistock Street. Strand District was abolished in October 1900 and became part of the Metropolitan Borough of Westminster.

=== Palaces ===
From the 12th century onwards, large mansions lined the Strand including several palaces and townhouses inhabited by bishops and royal courtiers, mainly on the south side, with their own river gates and landings directly on the Thames. The road was poorly maintained, with many pits and sloughs, and a paving order was issued in 1532 to improve traffic.

What later became Essex House on the Strand was originally an Outer Temple of the Knights Templar in the 11th century. In 1313, ownership passed to the Knights of St John. King Henry VIII gave the house to William, Baron Paget, in the early 16th century. Robert Dudley, Earl of Leicester, rebuilt the house in 1563, originally calling it Leicester House. It was renamed Essex House after being inherited by Robert Devereux, 2nd Earl of Essex, in 1588. It was demolished around 1674 and Essex Street, leading up to the Strand, was built on the location by property speculator Nicholas Barbon.

Arundel House was originally the town house of the Bishops of Bath and Wells. It was owned by William FitzWilliam, 1st Earl of Southampton, between 1539 and his death in 1542, with ownership passing to Thomas Seymour in 1545. After Seymour was executed in 1549, the property was sold to Henry FitzAlan, Earl of Arundel, and was owned by the Earldom for much of the 16th and 17th century. In 1666, it became the meeting place of the Royal Society after the Great Fire of London destroyed their previous venue. The house was demolished in 1678 and Arundel Street, adjoining the Strand, was built on the site.

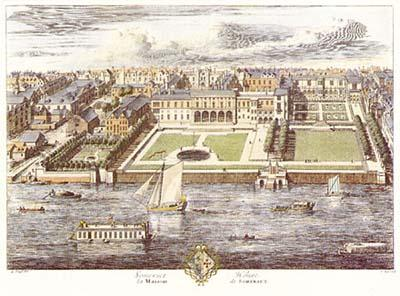
The original Somerset House in 1722

Somerset House was built by Edward Seymour, Duke of Somerset, regent of England from 1547 to 1549, demolishing three inns and the church of the Nativity of Our Lady and the Innocents in the process. After Somerset was executed in 1552, it became an occasional residence for Princess Elizabeth. When she became Queen in 1558, she returned part of the house to Seymour's family (with ownership passing to his son, Edward Seymour, 1st Earl of Hertford); the remainder was an occasional meeting place for the Royal Society. After Elizabeth's death in 1603, it was owned by Anne of Denmark, wife of James VI and I. The building was renamed Denmark House in commemoration of Anne's brother, Christian IV of Denmark. After James died in 1625, his body lay there in state for a month. The building was taken over by Parliament in 1645 following the Civil War, renaming it back to Somerset House. It had an irregular series of owners and residents for much of the 18th century until it was demolished in 1775. The house was rebuilt as a series of government buildings. The Stamp Office, later to become the Inland Revenue was established in Somerset House in 1789. In the late 20th century, a number of art galleries were set up on vacant parts, including the Courtauld Institute of Art and the King's College London School of Law.

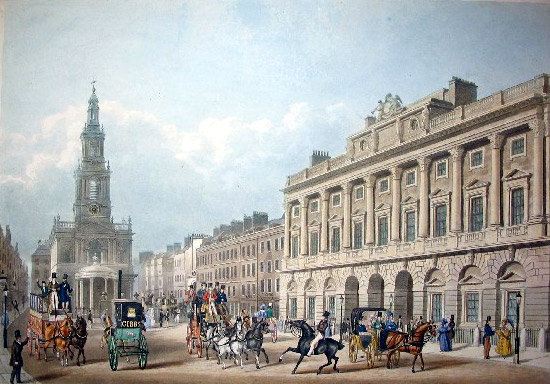
A 19th-century print showing St Mary le Strand and the Strand front of Somerset House

Savoy Palace was the London residence of John of Gaunt (uncle of King Richard II), the nation's power broker. In the 14th century the Savoy was the most magnificent nobleman's mansion in England. During the Peasants' Revolt of 1381, rebels, led by Wat Tyler, inflamed by opposition to the poll tax promoted by John of Gaunt, systematically demolished the Savoy and everything in it. In 1512 it was rebuilt as the Savoy Hospital for the poor. It gradually fell into dereliction and was divided into multiple tenancies. It was demolished in 1816–1820 to build the approach road to Waterloo Bridge. The Savoy Hotel now occupies this site.

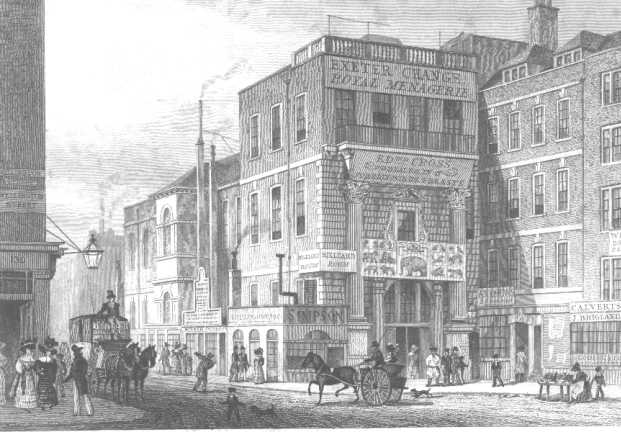
Exeter Exchange, viewed from the Strand in the early 19th century

Durham House, the historic London residence of the Bishop of Durham, was built circa 1345 and demolished in the mid-17th century. It was the home of Anne Boleyn. It had become derelict by the mid-17th century and was demolished in 1660. Durham Street and the Adelphi Buildings were built on its site.

York House was built as the London residence for the Bishop of Norwich not later than 1237. At the time of the Reformation it was acquired by King Henry VIII, and came to be known as York House when he granted it to the Archbishop of York in 1536. In the 1620s it was acquired by the royal favourite George Villiers, 1st Duke of Buckingham, and after an interlude during the Civil War it was returned to George Villiers, 2nd Duke of Buckingham, who sold it to developers in 1672. It was then demolished and new streets and buildings built on the site, including George Street, Villiers Street, Duke Street, Of Alley, and Buckingham Street.

Cecil House, also called Exeter House or Burghley House, was built in the 16th century by Lord Burghley as an expansion of an existing Tudor house. Exeter House was demolished in 1676 and Exeter Exchange built on the site. A menagerie was built on the upper floors in 1773, which was later run by Edward Cross, who housed lions, tigers, monkeys and hippopotami. In 1826, an elephant, Chunee, nearly broke free from its cage and had to be destroyed; the skeleton was later put on display. The exchange was demolished in 1829, with the menagerie moving to the Surrey Zoological Gardens, and replaced by Exeter Hall, noted for its Evangelical meetings. This was demolished in 1907, and the site is now occupied by the Strand Palace Hotel.

Other significant palaces along the Strand include Worcester House, formerly the Inn, or residence, of the Bishop of Carlisle, Salisbury House, used for royal lodgings in the 15th and 16th centuries, Bedford House demolished in 1704, Hungerford House, which was demolished and replaced, in turn, by Hungerford Market and Charing Cross station and Northumberland House, a large Jacobean mansion, the historic London residence of the Dukes of Northumberland; built in 1605 and demolished in 1874. Northumberland Avenue now occupies the site. The official residence of the Secretary of State, next door at No. 1 the Strand, became the first numbered address in London.

Apart from the rebuilt Somerset House, all of these buildings have been demolished and replaced from the 17th century onwards. A New Exchange was built on part of the gardens of Durham House, in 1608–1609, facing the Strand. This high-class shopping centre enjoyed considerable popularity but was eventually destroyed in 1737.

=== Modern era ===
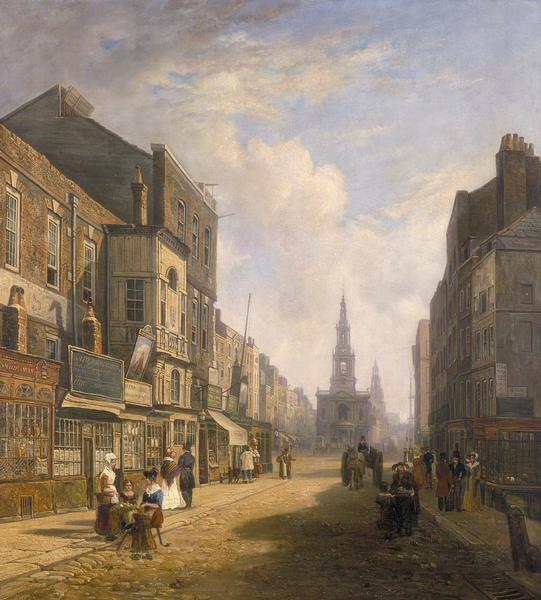
Strand, looking eastwards from Exeter Exchange (1822) – the distant church is St Mary le Strand, with St Clement Danes behind

During the 17th century, many of the grand mansions on the Strand were demolished as the aristocracy moved to the West End. The Duck and Drake tavern on Strand was famed as a venue for the conspirators involved in the Gunpowder Plot. In the time of the Civil War, the Nag's Head tavern was the venue of a meeting between Henry Ireton and some of the Levellers which resulted in the production of Remonstrance of the Army, demanding the abolition of the monarchy and the trial of King Charles I.

In the 18th century, coffee and chop houses were established on the street; Twinings was established at No. 206 in 1706 by Thomas Twining, supplier of tea to Queen Anne. The company claims to be the oldest ratepayer in Westminster. The Grecian Coffee House ran from around 1702 to 1803, while Tom's ran from 1706 to around 1775. Though these premises were well-known, the alleyways around the Strand were regular haunts for pickpockets and prostitutes during this time. The Rose Tavern, at the eastern end of the street, was frequented by lawyers during the 18th century. It was later demolished and became Thanet Place. The Crown and Anchor in Arundel Street was the main meeting place for the Catholic Association, and helped established the Roman Catholic Relief Act 1829. It was later used for Catholic politicians such as Daniel O'Connell to address constituents. The original premises burned down in 1854, but was rebuilt. Simpson's-in-the-Strand originally started at No. 100 in 1828 as a smoking and dining club. It later became a restaurant. The Strand was also notable in the 18th century as a centre for the British book trade, with numerous printers and publishers along the street. The prominent bookseller Andrew Millar is an example of one of the most successful publishers who owned a shop there.

In the 19th century, much of the Strand was rebuilt, and the houses to the south no longer backed onto the Thames and no longer had direct boat access, separated from the river by the Victoria Embankment constructed in 1865–1870 and reclaiming 37 acres (15 ha) of land. King's College, London was founded in 1828. The historic King's Building, based next to the church of St Mary-le-Strand, was designed by Robert Smirke and constructed in 1829–1831 to complete the riverside frontage of Somerset House. King's College Hospital opened as a branch of the college in 1840, and became a constituent part of the University of London in 1908. The current campus building was constructed between 1966 and 1972 by E.D. Jefferiss Mathews. In 2015, the college acquired Strand House, Bush House and other buildings in the Aldwych Quarter. The Royal Courts of Justice, at the eastern end of the Strand, was designed in the mid-1860s by G.E. Street as a replacement for the older courts at Westminster Hall, though construction was so delayed that he died shortly before Queen Victoria opened the courts in 1882. The West Green extension to the courts opened in 1911, while the Queen's Building opened in 1968.

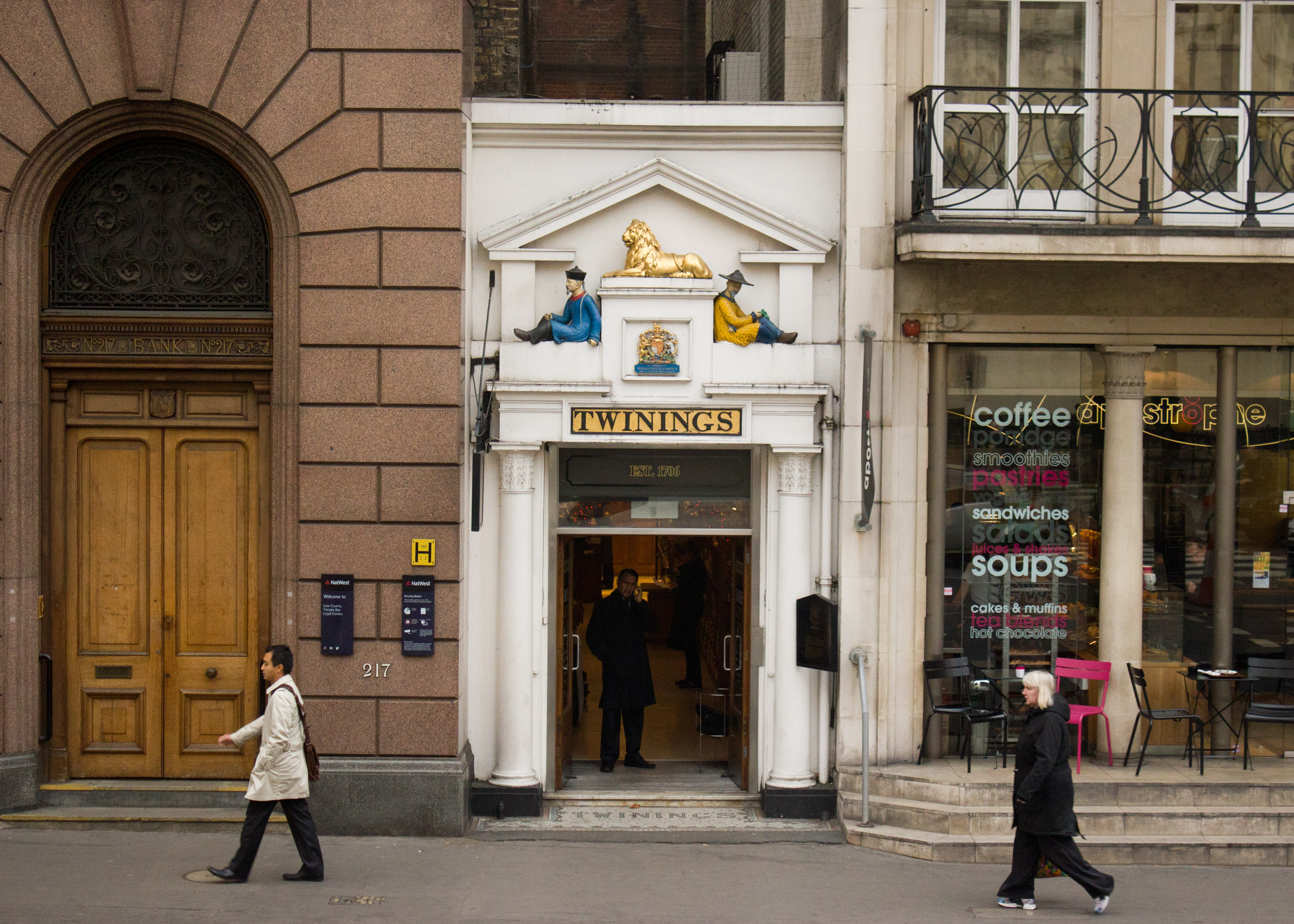
Twinings' Tea Shop has been based on the Strand since 1706

The architect John Nash redeveloped the western end of the Strand in the 1830s, including the construction of Charing Cross Hospital, later (1990s) converted for use as Charing Cross police station.

The street became well known for theatres, and at one point contained more than any other; including the Tivoli Music Hall at No. 65, the Adelphi, Gaiety, Savoy, Terry's and Vaudeville. In the 21st century, only the Adelphi, Vaudeville and Savoy remain. The Piccadilly branch line from Holborn to Aldwych was built partly to serve theatre traffic.

The Coal Hole tavern was founded at No. 91 in the early 19th century, and frequented by coal-heavers working on the Thames. The impresario Renton Nicholson held song-and-supper evenings at the inn, featuring tableaux vivants. The actor Edmund Kean established the Wolf Club at the venue, which is now commemorated by the Wolf Room.

Charing Cross railway station was built on the Strand in 1864, providing a boat train service to Europe, which stimulated the growth of hotels in the area to cater for travellers. These included the Charing Cross Hotel, attached to the station itself. Today, there are several luggage outlets and tourist agents on the Strand, as well as old postage stamp dealers. The philatelist Stanley Gibbons opened a shop at No. 435 in 1891. It moved to No. 391 in 1893, and is currently based at No. 399.

Strand Improvement Act 1896
- Act of Parliament
- Parliament of the United Kingdom
- Long title: An Act to authorise the widening of part of the Strand on the south side and the taking of lands in the Parishes of St. Martin-in-the-Fields and St Clement Danes and for other purposes.
- Citation: 59 & 60 Vict. c. ccviii

Dates
- Royal assent: 7 August 1896

Text of statute as originally enacted

The Strand Palace Hotel was designed by F. J. Wills and constructed in 1925–1930. The entrance was rebuilt in 1968, with the original being moved to the Victoria and Albert Museum. The Strand underwent extensive redevelopment in the mid-20th century. The length of road from St Mary's eastwards up to St Clement's was widened in 1900, subsuming the former Holywell Street which forked from the Strand and ran parallel with it to the north, leaving the two churches of St Mary Le Strand and St Clement Danes as islands in the centre of the road. The Gaiety Theatre was demolished, to be replaced by Citibank House, while Villiers House and New South Wales House were both built in 1957–1959. New South Wales House was subsequently demolished in 1996 and replaced by an office block. In 1998, a statue of Oscar Wilde was built at the junction of Adelaide Street and Duncannon Street, adjoining the western end of the Strand.

Between January 2021 and December 2022, Westminster City Council's Strand Aldwych Scheme works took place, pedestrianising Strand between Melbourne Place and Lancaster Place whilst Aldwych was converted into a two-way street.

== Churches ==
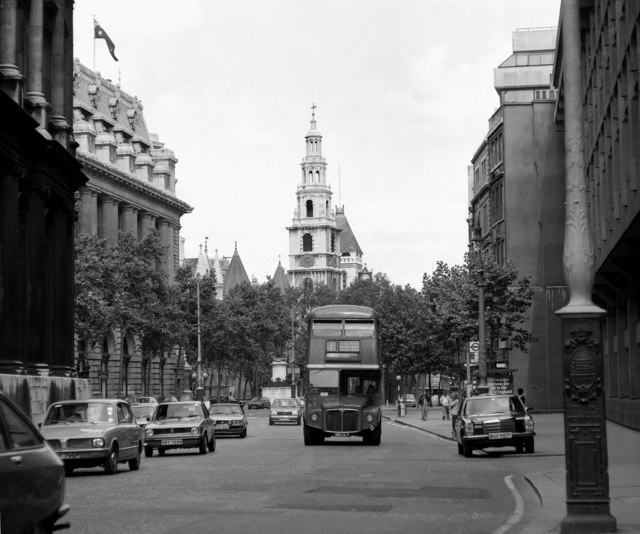
An AEC Routemaster on route 1 heading down the Strand in 1981, with St Clement Danes church in the background

The church of St Clement Danes is believed to date from the 9th century. The name may have come from Harold Harefoot, a Danish king who ruled England around 1035–1040 and is buried in the church, or from a place of refuge for Danes after the conquest by Alfred the Great. It was transferred to the Order of the Knights Templar by Henry II in 1189. It survived the Great Fire in 1666, but was declared unsafe and rebuilt by Christopher Wren in 1679. The building was damaged during the Blitz in 1941, gutting much of the interior, and was rebuilt in 1958 by Sam Lloyd, since when it has served as the central church of the Royal Air Force. The church is one of two possible origins for the "St Clement's" in the nursery rhyme "Oranges and Lemons", though more contemporary accounts suggest St Clement's, Eastcheap in the City of London to be more likely.

St Mary le Strand was designed by James Gibbs and completed in 1717, to replace a previous church demolished to make way for Somerset House. It was the first building to be designed by Gibbs, who was influenced by Wren and Michelangelo. The column on top of the church was originally designed to support a statue of then-reigning Queen Anne, but was replaced with a spire following Anne's death in 1714. It survived the Blitz but was in poor shape until John Betjeman led a campaign to restore it in the 1970s. Essex Street Chapel, the birthplace of British Unitarianism, abuts onto the Strand. The original chapel was built in 1774, but damaged in the Blitz. It was restored after the war, and now serves as the denominational headquarters of the General Assembly of Unitarian and Free Christian Churches.

== Notable residents ==
The print seller Rudolph Ackermann lived and worked at No. 101 The Strand between 1797 and 1827. His shop was one of the first to have gas lighting fitted.

In the 19th century, The Strand became a newly fashionable address and many avant-garde writers and thinkers gathered here, among them Thomas Carlyle, Charles Dickens, John Stuart Mill, Ralph Waldo Emerson and the scientist Thomas Henry Huxley. No. 142 was the home of radical publisher and physician John Chapman, who published contemporary authors from this house during the 1850s and edited the journal Westminster Review from 1851. George Eliot lived at No. 142 between 1851 and 1855. Virginia Woolf regularly travelled along the Strand, and a King's College building named after her is in nearby Kingsway.

== Cultural references ==
The Strand is the subject of a famous music hall song "Let's All Go Down the Strand", composed by Harry Castling and C. W. Murphy. The song opens with a group of tourists staying the night at Trafalgar Square while about to embark for the Rhineland. The chorus of "Let's all go down the Strand – have a banana" is now recognised as a stereotypical part of Cockney music hall and parodied by English comedian Bill Bailey. John Betjeman used the title of the song for a television documentary made for Associated-Rediffusion in 1967. In the same year, Margaret Williams used it for a stage comedy. Australian-born composer Percy Grainger used the name for his 1911 piano trio Handel in the Strand.

Virginia Woolf wrote about the Strand in several of her essays, including "Street Haunting: A London Adventure", and the novel Mrs. Dalloway. T. S. Eliot alluded to the Strand in his 1905 poem "At Graduation" and in his 1922 poem "The Waste Land" (part III, The Fire Sermon, v. 258: "and along the Strand, up Queen Victoria Street"). John Masefield also referred to a "jostling in the Strand" in his poem "On Growing Old". The poem "Buses on the Strand", written in 1958 by Richard Percival Lister, featured in TFL's "Poems on the Underground" scheme in 2013, appearing in tube carriages all over London. The scheme celebrated the 150th year of the London Underground, showing works by poets with close London connections.

The Strand Magazine, which began publishing in 1891, was named after the street. A BBC World Service arts and culture radio series was called The Strand. Bush House, situated on the Strand, was home to the World Service between 1941 and 2012.

The standard British Monopoly board has Strand in the red group with the nearby Fleet Street and Trafalgar Square.

== See also ==
- Australia House
- Gibraltar House
- Lancaster Place
- Savoy Court
- Southampton Street
- Strand School
- Zimbabwe House
