= Commissioners of Woods and Forests =

Government officials in UK

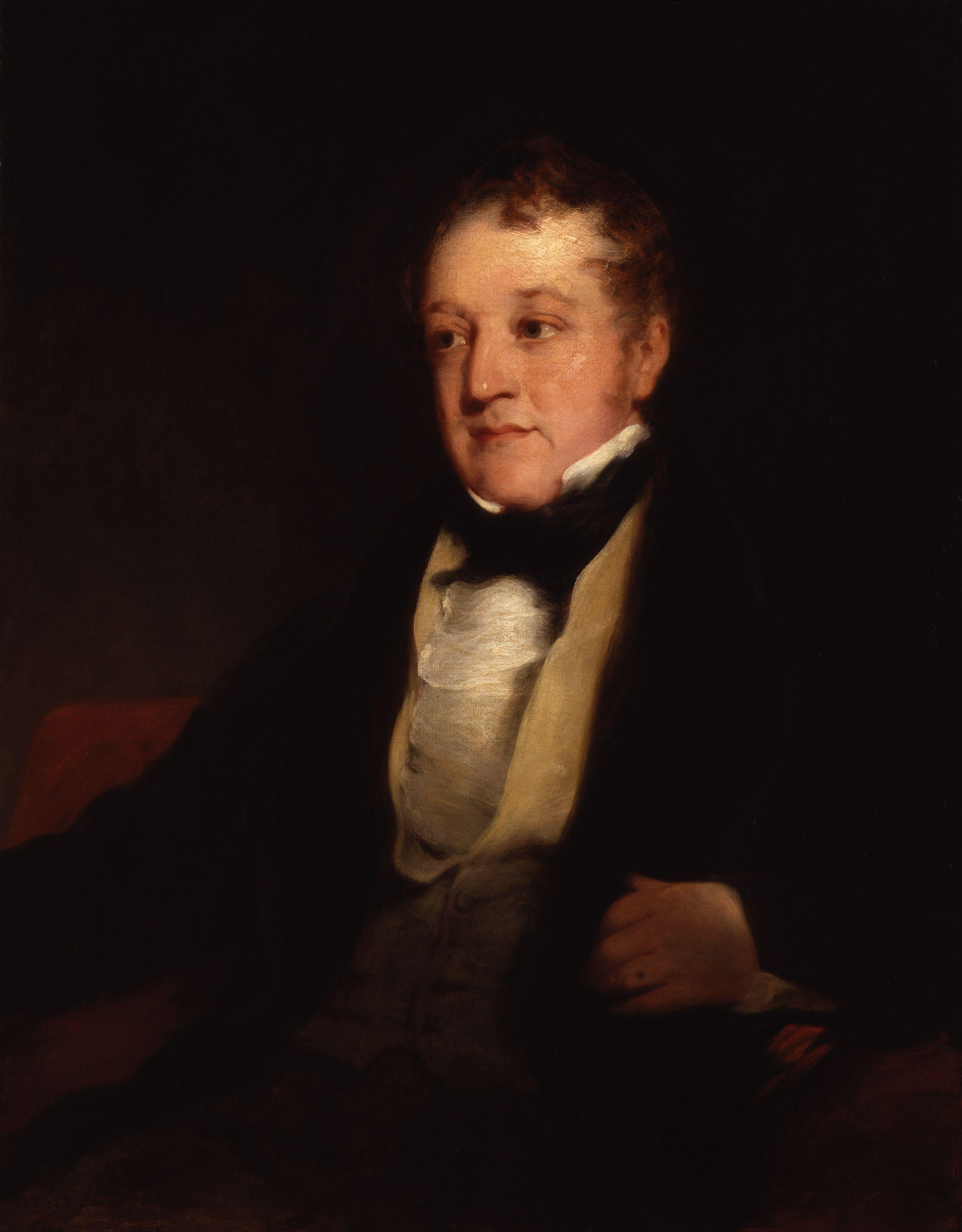
William Huskisson, First Commissioner of Woods and Forests between 1814 and 1823.

The Commissioners of Woods, Forests and Land Revenues were established in the United Kingdom in 1810 by merging the former offices of Surveyor General of Woods, Forests, Parks, and Chases and Surveyor General of the Land Revenues of the Crown into a three-man commission. The name of the commission was changed in 1832 to the Commissioners of Woods, Forests, Land Revenues, Works and Buildings.

The hereditary land revenues of the Crown in Scotland, formerly under the management of the Barons of the Exchequer, were transferred to the Commissioners of Woods, Forests, Land Revenues, Works and Buildings and their successors under the Crown Lands (Scotland) Act 1832, the Crown Lands (Scotland) Act 1833 and the Crown Lands (Scotland) Act 1835.

The Crown Lands Act 1851 replaced the commissioners with two separate commissions, the Commissioners of Works and Public Buildings and the Commissioners of Woods, Forests and Land Revenues dividing between them the public and the commercial functions of the Crown lands.

== Commissioners of Woods and Forests, 1810-1851 ==
First Commissioners are followed by the names of their co-commissioners

Name	Entered office	Left office
Sylvester Douglas, 1st Baron Glenbervie: William Dacres Adams; Henry Dawkins	1810	1814
William Huskisson: William Dacres Adams; Henry Dawkins	1814	1823
Charles Arbuthnot: William Dacres Adams; Henry Dawkins	1823	1827
George Howard, 6th Earl of Carlisle: William Dacres Adams; Henry Dawkins	1827	1827
William Sturges Bourne: William Dacres Adams; Henry Dawkins	1827	1828
Charles Arbuthnot: William Dacres Adams; Henry Dawkins	1828	1828
William Lowther, 2nd Earl of Lonsdale: William Dacres Adams; Henry Dawkins	1828	1830
George Agar-Ellis: William Dacres Adams; Henry Dawkins	1830	1831
John Ponsonby, Viscount Duncannon: William Dacres Adams; Henry Dawkins; Sir Benjamin C. Stephenson (replaced Dawkins)	1831	1834
Sir John Hobhouse: William Dacres Adams; Sir Benjamin C. Stephenson	1834	1834
Lord Granville Somerset: Sir Benjamin C. Stephenson; Alexander Milne; Charles Henry Somerset	1834	1835
John Ponsonby, Viscount Duncannon: Sir Benjamin C. Stephenson; Alexander Milne	1835	1841
Henry Pelham-Clinton, Earl of Lincoln: Alexander Milne; Charles Alexander Gore	1841	1846
Charles Canning, 2nd Viscount Canning: Alexander Milne; Charles Alexander Gore	1846	1846
George Howard, Viscount Morpeth: Alexander Milne; Charles Alexander Gore	1846	1850
Edward Seymour, Lord Seymour: Alexander Milne; Charles Alexander Gore; Thomas Francis Kennedy (replaced Milne)	1850	1851
