= West Country English =

Variety of the English language

- Native to: England
- Region: West Country
- Language family: Indo-European: Germanic; West Germanic; North Sea Germanic; Anglo-Frisian; Anglic; West Saxon; West Country English
- Early forms: Old English: West Saxon Old English; Middle English; Early Modern English
- Dialects: Cornish; Dorset

Language codes
- ISO 639-3: –
- The official region of South West England, approximately co-extensive with the areas where "West Country" varieties are spoken.

Speech example
An example of a female with a mostly rhotic accent from Bristol (Sophie Anderson).

Speech example
An example of a working-class female with a rhotic accent from Bristol (Julie Burchill).

Speech example
An example of a male with a partially rhotic accent from Devon (Martin Turner).

West Country English is a group of English-language varieties and accents traditionally used by the native population of the West Country: the southwest of England.

The West Country is often defined as encompassing the official region of South West England: Cornwall, Devon, Dorset, Somerset, Wiltshire, Bristol and Gloucestershire. However, the exact northern and eastern boundaries of the area are hard to define. In the adjacent counties of Herefordshire, Worcestershire, Hampshire, Berkshire and Oxfordshire, it is possible to encounter similar accents and indeed, much the same distinct dialect, albeit with some similarities to others in neighbouring regions. Although natives of all these locations, especially in rural parts, often still have West Country influences in their speech, their increased mobility and urbanisation has meant that in the more populous of these counties the dialect itself, as opposed to the people's various local accents, is becoming increasingly rare.

Academically the regional variations are considered to be dialectal forms. The Survey of English Dialects captured manners of speech across the South West region that were just as different from Standard English as any from the far North of England. There is some influence from the Welsh and Cornish languages depending on the specific location.

== Earliest records ==
=== Medieval period ===
- The Late West Saxon dialect was the standard literary language of later Anglo-Saxon England, and consequently the majority of Anglo-Saxon literature, including the epic poem Beowulf and the poetic Biblical paraphrase Judith, is preserved in West Saxon dialect, though not all of it was originally written in West Saxon.
- In the medieval period, Sumer is icumen in (13th century) is a notable example of a work in Wessex dialect.
- The Cornish language (and Breton) descended from the ancient British language (Brythonic/Brittonic) that was spoken all over what is now the West Country until the West Saxons conquered and settled most of the area. The Cornish language throughout much of the High Middle Ages was not just the vernacular but the prestigious language in Cornwall among all classes, but was also spoken in large areas of Devon well after the Norman conquest. Cornish began to decline after the Late Middle Ages with English expanding westwards, and after the Prayer Book Rebellion, suffered terminal decline, dying out in the 18th century. (Its existence today is a revival).

=== 17th century ===
- In King Lear, Edgar speaks in the West Country dialect, as one of his various personae.
- Both Sir Francis Drake and Sir Walter Raleigh were noted at the Court of Queen Elizabeth for their strong Devon accents.

=== 18th century ===
- Tom Jones (1749) by Henry Fielding, set in Somerset, again mainly dialogue. Considered one of the first true English novels.

== 19th century literature ==
- William Barnes' Dorset dialect poetry (1801–1886).
- Walter Hawken Tregellas (1831–1894), author of many stories written in the local dialect of the county of Cornwall and a number of other works.
- Anthony Trollope's (1815–1882) series of books Chronicles of Barsetshire (1855–1867) also use some dialect in dialogue.
- The novels of Thomas Hardy (1840–1928) often use the dialect in dialogue, notably Tess of the D'Urbervilles (1891).
- Wiltshire Rhymes and Tales in the Wiltshire Dialect (1894) and other works by Edward Slow.
- The Gilbert and Sullivan operetta The Sorcerer is set in the fictional village of Ploverleigh in Somerset. Some dialogue and song lyrics, especially for the chorus, are a phonetic approximation of West Country speech. The Pirates of Penzance and Ruddigore are both set in Cornwall.
- John Davey, a farmer from Zennor, records the native Cornish language Cranken Rhyme.
- R. D. Blackmore's Lorna Doone. According to Blackmore, he relied on a "phonogogic" style for his characters' speech, emphasizing their accents and word formation. He expended great effort, in all of his novels, on his characters' dialogues and dialects, striving to recount realistically not only the ways, but also the tones and accents, in which thoughts and utterances were formed by the various sorts of people who lived in the Exmoor district.

== Literature, film and television since the 20th century ==
In literary contexts, most of the usage has been in either poetry or dialogue, to add local colour. It has rarely been used for serious prose in recent times but was used much more extensively until the 19th century. West Country dialects are commonly represented as "Mummerset", a kind of catch-all southern rural accent invented for broadcasting.

- 'Zummerzet speech' is discussed in The Somerset Coast (1909) by Charles George Harper.
- Songs of the Soil by Percy G Stone, verse in Isle of Wight dialect, rendered phonetically, showing similarities with 'core' West Country dialects.
- A Glastonbury Romance (1933) by John Cowper Powys (1872–1963) contains dialogue written in imitation of the local Somerset dialect.
- Albert John Coles (1876–1965), writing as Jan Stewer, wrote 3,000 short stories in the Devonshire dialect for local Devon newspapers, and published collections of them, as well as performing them widely on stage, film, and broadcast.
- David Foot (1929–2021) wrote often about the West Country. Footsteps from East Coker was about his childhood village and beyond.
- Laurie Lee's (1914–1997) works such as Cider with Rosie (1959) portray a somewhat idealised Gloucestershire childhood in the Five Valleys area.
- John Fowles's Daniel Martin features the title character's girlfriend's dialect.
- Dennis Potter's Blue Remembered Hills is a television play about children in the Forest of Dean during the Second World War. The dialogue is written in the style of the Forest dialect.
- The songs of Adge Cutler (from Nailsea, died 1974) were famous for their West Country dialect, sung in a strong Somerset accent. His legacy lives on in the present day Wurzels and other so-called "Scrumpy and Western" artists.
- The folk group The Yetties perform songs composed in the dialect of Dorset (they originate from Yetminster).
- Andy Partridge, lead singer with the group XTC, has a pronounced Wiltshire accent. Although more noticeable in his speech, his accent may also be heard in some of his singing.
- J. K. Rowling's Harry Potter fantasy novels feature Hagrid, a character who has a West Country accent.
- Berk, the central monster character from The Trap Door, is voiced by actor and comedian Willie Rushton.
- Archaeologist Phil Harding from Channel 4's Time Team speaks with a strong Wiltshire accent.

== History and origins ==
Until the 19th century, the West Country and its dialects were largely protected from outside influences, due to its relative geographical isolation. While standard English derives from the Old English Mercian dialects, the West Country dialects derive from the West Saxon dialect, which formed the earliest English language standard. Thomas Spencer Baynes claimed in 1856 that, due to its position at the heart of the Kingdom of Wessex, the relics of Anglo-Saxon accent, idiom and vocabulary were best preserved in the Somerset dialect.

The dialects have their origins in the expansion of Old English into the west of modern-day England, where the kingdom of Wessex (West-Saxons) had been founded in the 6th century. As the Kings of Wessex became more powerful they enlarged their kingdom westwards and north-westwards by taking territory from the British kingdoms in those districts. From Wessex, the Anglo-Saxons spread into the Celtic regions of present-day Devon, Somerset and Gloucestershire, bringing their language with them. At a later period, Cornwall came under Wessex influence, which appears to become more extensive after the time of Athelstan in the 10th century. However, the spread of the English language took much longer here than elsewhere.

Outside Cornwall, it is believed that the various local dialects reflect the territories of various West Saxon tribes, who had their own dialects which fused together into a national language in the later Anglo-Saxon period.

As Lt-Col. J. A. Garton observed in 1971, traditional Somerset English has a venerable and respectable origin, and is not a mere "debasement" of Standard English:

The dialect is not, as some people suppose, English spoken in a slovenly and ignorant way. It is the remains of a language—the court language of King Alfred. Many words, thought to be wrongly pronounced by the countryman, are actually correct, and it is the accepted pronunciation which is wrong. English pronounces W-A-R-M worm, and W-O-R-M wyrm; in the dialect W-A-R-M is pronounced as it is spelt, Anglo-Saxon W-E-A-R-M. The Anglo-Saxon for worm is W-Y-R-M. Polite English pronounces W-A-S-P wosp; the Anglo-Saxon word is W-O-P-S and a Somerset man still says WOPSE. The verb To Be is used in the old form, I be, Thee bist, He be, We be, Thee 'rt, They be. 'Had I known I wouldn't have gone', is 'If I'd a-know'd I 'ooden never a-went'; 'A' is the old way of denoting the past participle, and went is from the verb to wend (Anglo-Saxon wendan).

In some cases, many of these forms are closer to modern Saxon (commonly called Low German/Low Saxon) than Standard British English is, e.g.

Low German	Somerset	Standard British English
Ik bün	I be/A be	I am
Du büst	Thee bist	You are (archaic "Thou art")
He is	He be	He is

The use of masculine and sometimes feminine, rather than neuter, pronouns with non-animate referents also parallels Low German, which unlike English retains grammatical genders. The pronunciation of "s" as "z" is also similar to Low German. However, recent research proposes that some syntactical features of English, including the unique forms of the verb to be, originate rather with the Brythonic languages. (See Celtic language influence below.)

In more recent times, West Country dialects have been treated with some derision, which has led many local speakers to abandon them or water them down. In particular it is British comedy which has brought them to the fore outside their native regions, and paradoxically groups such as The Wurzels, a comic North Somerset/Bristol band from whom the term Scrumpy and Western music originated, have both popularised and made fun of them simultaneously. In an unusual regional breakout, the Wurzels' song "The Combine Harvester" reached the top of the UK charts in 1976, where it did nothing to dispel the "simple farmer" stereotype of Somerset and West Country folk. It and all their songs are sung entirely in a local version of the dialect, which is somewhat exaggerated and distorted. Some words used aren't even typical of the local dialect. For instance, the word "nowt" is used in the song "Threshing Machine". This word is generally used in more northern parts of England, with the West Country equivalent being "nawt".

=== Celtic-language influence ===
The shifting of the linguistic boundary in Cornwall from 1300 to 1750

Although the English language gradually spread into Cornwall after approximately the 13th century, a complete language shift to English took centuries more. The frontier between English in the east and Cornish in the west shifted markedly in the county between 1300 and 1750 (see figure).

During the Prayer Book Rebellion of 1549, which centred on Devon and Cornwall, many of the Cornish objected to the Book of Common Prayer, on the basis that many Cornish could not speak English. Cornish probably ceased to be spoken as a community language sometime around 1780, with the last monoglot Cornish speaker believed to be Chesten Marchant, who died in 1676 at Gwithian (Dolly Pentreath was bilingual). However, some people retained a fragmented knowledge and some words were adopted by dialect(s) in Cornwall.

In recent years, the traffic has reversed, with the revived Cornish language reclaiming Cornish words that had been preserved in the local dialect into its lexicon, and also (especially "Revived Late Cornish") borrowing other dialect words. However, there has been some controversy over whether all of these words are of native origin, as opposed to imported from parts of England, or the Welsh Marches. Some modern-day revived Cornish speakers have been known to use Cornish words within an English sentence, and even those who are not speakers of the language sometimes use words from the language in names.

Brythonic languages have also had a long-term influence on the West Country dialects beyond Cornwall, both as a substrate (certain West Country dialect words and possibly grammatical features) and languages of contact. Recent research on the roots of English proposes that the extent of Brythonic syntactic influence on Old English and Middle English may have been underestimated, specifically citing the preponderance of forms of the verbs to be and to do in South West England and their grammatical similarity to the Welsh and Cornish forms as opposed to the forms in other Germanic languages.

Bos: Cornish verb to be
Present tense (short form)	Present tense (subjunctive)	Standard British English
Ov	Biv	I am (dialect: "I be")
Os	Bi	You are (dialect: "(Th)ee be")
Yw	Bo	He/she/it is
On	Byn	We are
Owgh	Bowgh	You are (plural)
Yns	Bons	They are

The Cornish dialect, or Anglo-Cornish (to avoid confusion with the Cornish language), has the most substantial Celtic language influence because many western parts were non-English speaking even into the early modern period. In places such as Mousehole, Newlyn and St Ives, fragments of Cornish survived in English even into the 20th century, e.g. some numerals (especially for counting fish) and the Lord's Prayer were noted by W. D. Watson in 1925, Edwin Norris collected the Creed in 1860, and J. H. Nankivel also recorded numerals in 1865. The dialect of West Penwith is particularly distinctive, especially in terms of grammar. This is most likely due to the late decay of the Cornish language in this area. In Cornwall the following places were included in the Survey of English Dialects: Altarnun, Egloshayle, Gwinear, Kilkhampton, Mullion, St Buryan, and St Ewe.

In other areas, Celtic vocabulary is less common; some possible examples of Brythonic words surviving in the Devon dialect include:

- Goco — A bluebell
- Jonnick — Pleasant, agreeable

== Characteristics ==
=== Phonology ===
- West Country accents are rhotic like most Canadian, American, Irish and Scottish accents, meaning that the historical loss of syllable-final /r/ did not take place, in contrast to non-rhotic accents like Received Pronunciation. Often, this /r/ is specifically realised as the retroflex approximant [ɻ], which is typically lengthened at the ends of words. This rhoticity can be attributed to the relative isolation of the South West from the rest of England. Rhoticity appears to be declining in both real and apparent time in some areas of the West Country, for example Dorset.
- /aɪ/, as in guide or life, more precisely approaches [ɒɪ], [ɑɪ], or [əɪ].
- /aʊ/, as in house or cow, more precisely approaches [æy] or [ɐʏ~ɐʊ], with even very front and unrounded variants such as [ɛɪ].
- Word-final "-ing" /ɪŋ/ in polysyllabic words is typically realised as [ɪn].
- /æ/, as in trap or cat, is often open [æ~a], the more open variant is fairly common in urban areas but especially common in rural areas.
  - The TRAP–BATH split associated with London English may not exist for some speakers or may exist marginally based simply on a length difference. In other words, some may not have any contrast between /æ/ and /ɑː/, for example making palm and Pam homophones (though some pronounce the /l/ in palm). For some West Country speakers, the vowel is even the same in the TRAP, BATH, PALM, and START word sets: [a]. The split's "bath" vowel (appearing as the letter "a" in such other words as grass, ask, path, etc.) can also be represented by the sounds [æː] or [aː] in different parts of the West Country (RP has [ɑː] in such words); the isoglosses in the Linguistic Atlas of England are not straightforward cases of clear borders. Short vowels have also been reported, e.g., [a].
- h-dropping: initial /h/ can often be omitted so "hair" and "air" become homophones. This is common in working-class speech in most parts of England.
- t-glottalisation: use of the glottal stop [ʔ] as an allophone of /t/, generally when in any syllable-final position.
- The word-final letter "y" is pronounced [ei] or [ɪi]; for example: party [ˈpʰäɻʔei], silly [ˈsɪlei] etc.
- The Survey of English Dialects found that Cornwall retained some older features of speech that are now considered "Northern" in England. For example, a close /ʊ/ in suck, but, cup, etc. and sometimes a short /a/ in words such as aunt.
- Initial fricative consonants can be voiced, particularly in more traditional and older speakers, so that "s" is pronounced as Standard English "z" and "f" as Standard English "v". This feature is now exceedingly rare.
- In words containing "r" before a vowel, there is frequent metathesis – "gurt" (great), "Burdgwater" (Bridgwater) and "chillurn" (children)
- "l" sounds are vocalised (pronounced like "w") when not followed by a vowel, so "all old people" is [uːɫ ɔʊb pʰiːpʰu].
  - As a result, the fool-fall merger is common, with both pronounced /fuː(l)/.
- In Bristol, a terminal "a" can be realised as the sound [ɔː] – e.g. cinema as "cinemaw" and America as "Americaw" – which is often perceived by non-Bristolians to be an intrusive "l", known as the "Bristol l". Hence the old joke about the three Bristolian sisters Evil, Idle and Normal – i.e.: Eva, Ida, and Norma. The name Bristol itself (originally Bridgestowe or Bristow) is often claimed to have originated from this local pronunciation, though this is contested.

=== Vocabulary ===
- Some of the vocabulary used relates to English words of a bygone era, e.g. the verb "to hark" (as in "'ark a'ee"), "thee" (often abbreviated to "'ee"), the increased use of the infinitive form of the verb "to be" etc.

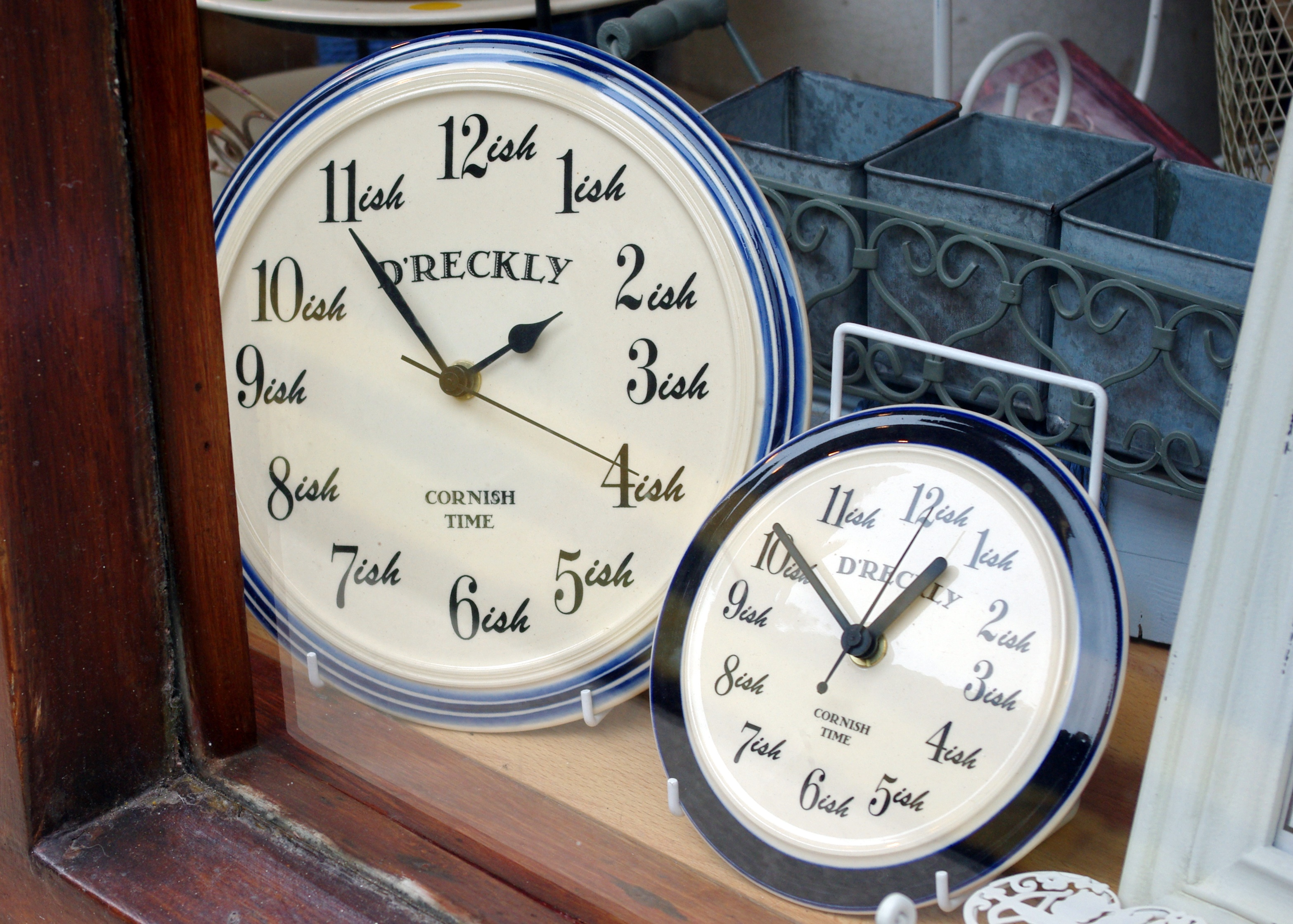
"D'reckly" on souvenir clocks in Cornwall

Some of these terms are obsolete, but some are in current use.

Words and Phrases	Meanings
acker (North Somerset, Hampshire, Isle of Wight)	friend
afear'd (Dorset)	to be afraid, e.g. Dorset's official motto, "Who's afear'd".
alaska (North Somerset)	I will ask her
allernbatch (Devon)	old sore
Alright, me ansum? (Cornwall & Devon)	How are you, my friend? (lit. "(Are you) alright, my handsome?")
Alright, me babber? (Somerset), Gloucestershire and Bristol	Similar to "Alright, me ansum?"
Alright, me lover?	(just as with the phrase "alright, mate?", when said by a person from the West Country, it has no sexual or even gender-based connotations; it is merely a greeting. Commonly used across the West Country.)
anywhen (Hampshire, Isle of Wight)	at any time
'appen (Devon)	perhaps, possibly
appleknocker (Isle of Wight)	a resident of the Isle of Wight.
bad lot (North Somerset)	e.g. "They'm a bad lot, mind" (lit. "They are a bad group, mind you")
baint (Dorset)	am not; e.g. "I baint afear'd o' thic wopsy" (lit. "I be not afraid of this wasp").
bauy, bay, bey (Exeter)	boy
benny (Bristol)	to lose your temper (from a character in Crossroads)
Billy Baker (Yeovil)	woodlouse
blige (Bristol)	blimey
boris (Exeter)	daddy longlegs
bunny (West Hampshire/East Dorset)	steep wooded valley
caulkhead (Isle of Wight)	a long-standing island resident, usually a descendant of a family living there. This refers to the island's heavy involvement in the production of rope and caulk.
cheers (Dorset/Wiltshire/Gloucestershire)	goodbye or see you later, e.g. Woman: "I've got to get going now". Man: "Ah? Cheers then".
cheerzen/cheers'en (Somerset, Bristol)	thank you (lit. "Cheers, then")
chinny reckon (North Somerset)	I do not believe you in the slightest (from medieval West Country English ich ne reckon 'I don't reckon/calculate')
chine (East Dorset/Isle of Wight)	steep wooded valley
chiggy wig (Dorset); chuggy pig (North Somerset)	woodlouse
chump (North Somerset)	log (for the fire)
chuting/shooting (North Somerset)	guttering
comical (North Somerset, Isle of Wight)	peculiar, e.g. "'e were proper comical" (lit. "He was very strange")
combe (Devon, Somerset, Wiltshire, Isle of Wight) (pronounced 'coombe')	steep wooded valley
coombe (Devon, North Somerset, Dorset)	steep wooded valley. Combe/Coombe is the second most common placename element in Devon and is equivalent to the Welsh cwm.
coupie/croupie (North Somerset, Wiltshire, Dorset, Isle of Wight & Bristol)	crouch, as in the phrase "coupie down"
crowst (Cornwall)	a picnic lunch, crib
cuzzel (Cornwall)	soft
daddy granfer (North Somerset)	woodlouse
daps (Bristol, Wiltshire, Dorset, Somerset, Gloucestershire)	sportshoes (plimsolls or trainers) (also used widely in South Wales)
Diddykai, Diddycoy, Diddy (Isle of Wight, Hampshire, Somerset, Wiltshire)	Gypsy, Irish Traveller
dimpsy (Devon)	descriptive of the state of twilight, as in "it's getting a bit dimpsy"
dizzibles (Isle of Wight)	state of undress (from French deshabille)
doughboy (Dorset, Somerset)	dumpling
dreckley (Cornwall, Devon, Somerset & Isle of Wight)	soon but without urgency (from "directly" once in common English usage for straightaway or directly); e.g. "I be wiv 'ee dreckley" (lit. "I'll be with thee [you] directly [soon-ish]"). It can also be the pronunciation of the literal word "directly", as in "ee looked me dreckly in the eyes".
drive (Bristol, Gloucestershire, Somerset & Wiltshire)	any driver of a taxi or bus; a common farewell when disembarking from a bus is "Cheers, drive!"
emmet (Cornwall and North Somerset)	tourist or visitor (derogatory)
er	he (despite sounding similar to "her")
et (North Somerset)	that, e.g. "Giss et peak" (lit. "Give us [i.e. me] that pitchfork")
facety/facetie (Glos.)	stuck up, entitled, snobbish e.g. "She's a right facety one" (She is very snobbish)
gallybagger (Isle of Wight)	scarecrow
geddon; geddy on (Crediton, Devon)	get on, e.g. "geddon chap!"; enthusiastic encouragement or delight
gert lush (Bristol)	very good (lit. "great(ly) lush")
gleanie (North Somerset)	guinea fowl
gockey (Cornwall)	idiot
gramersow (Cornwall)	woodlouse
granfer	grandfather
granfergrig (Wiltshire)	woodlouse
grockle (Devon, Dorset, Somerset, Wiltshire, west Hampshire and the Isle of Wight)	tourist, visitor or Gypsy (derogatory)
grockle shell (Devon, Dorset, Somerset, Wiltshire and the Isle of Wight)	caravan or motor home (derogatory)
grockle can (Devon, Dorset, Somerset, Wiltshire and the Isle of Wight)	a bus or a coach carrying tourists (derogatory)
gurt (Cornwall, Devon, Somerset, Dorset, Bristol, Wiltshire, South Glos and the Isle of Wight)	big or great, used to express a large size often as extra emphasis; e.g. "That's a gurt big tractor!"
haling (North Somerset)	coughing
(h)ang about (Cornwall, Devon, Somerset, Dorset, Hampshire & the Isle of Wight)	wait or pause, but often exclaimed when a sudden thought occurs.
hark at he (Dorset, Wiltshire, Somerset, Hampshire, Isle of Wight) (pronounced 'ark a' 'ee)	listen to him, often sarcastic.
headlights (Cornwall)	light-headedness, giddiness
hilts and gilts (North Somerset)	female and male piglets, respectively.
hinkypunk	will o' the wisp
hucky duck (Somerset, particularly Radstock)	aqueduct ("Aqueduct" was a rather new-fangled word for the Somerset colliers of the time and got corrupted to 'Hucky Duck'.)
huppenstop (North Somerset)	raised stone platform where milk churns are left for collection — no longer used but many still exist outside farms.
ideal (Bristol, North Somerset)	idea; in Bristol there is a propensity for local speakers to add an /l/ to words ending with /ə/
in any case
janner (Devon, esp. Plymouth)	a term with various meanings, normally associated with Devon. An old term for someone who makes their living off of the sea. Plymothians are often generally referred to as Janners, and supporters of the city's football team Plymouth Argyle are sometimes also referred to thus. In Wiltshire, a similar word ' jidder ' is used — possible relation to 'gypsy'.
Janny Reckon (Cornwall and Devon)	Derived from Chinny Reckon and Janner, and is often used in response to a wildly exaggerated fisherman's tale.
jasper (Devon, Wiltshire, West Hampshire)	wasp.
keendle teening (Cornwall)	candle lighting
kern (Somerset)	to thicken, particularly in reference to dairy products — 'kerned yogurt'
kimberlin (Portland)	someone from Weymouth or further away — not a Portlander
love; my/me love; lover/luvver	terms of endearment when used on their own. Can also be joined to a greeting and even used towards strangers, e.g. "Good morning, my luvver" may be said by a shop keeper to a customer. See also "Alright, my luvver?".
ling (Cornwall)	to throw Ling 'ee 'ere (Throw it here; lit. "Throw thee (it) here")
Madderdo'ee (Cornwall)	Does it matter?
maid (Dorset, Devon)	girl
maggoty (Dorset)	fanciful
mackey (Bristol)	massive or large, often to benefit
mallyshag (Isle of Wight)	caterpillar
mang (Devon)	to mix
mush (Dorset, Gloucestershire, south Hampshire)	friendly term of endearment, as in "mate"
nipper (Isle of Wight/Gloucestershire)	a young boy; also a term of endearment between heterosexual men used in the same way as "mate".
Now we're farming (Somerset)	All is proceeding nicely or as planned, used in a similar way to the phrase "now we're cooking with gas".
old butt (Gloucestershire, Forest of Dean)	friend
ooh arr (Devon)	multiple meanings, including "oh yes". Popularised by the Wurzels, this phrase has become stereotypical, and is used often to mock speakers of West Country dialects. In the modern day "Ooh Ah" is commonly used, though mostly avoided due to stereotypes.
ort/ought vs nort/nought (Devon)	something/anything vs nothing; "I a'en got ought for'ee" (lit. "I haven't got anything for thee [you]"; "'Er did'n give I nought" (lit. "He didn't give I [me] nothing")
overlander; often abbreviated "overner" (Isle of Wight)	a non-resident of the Island, an outsider. "Overlander" is also used in parts of Australia.
Parcel of ol' Crams (Devon)	"a phrase with which the native sum up and dismisses everything that he ... (a) cannot comprehend, (b) does not believe, (c) has no patience with, or (d) is entertained by but unwilling to praise."
piggy widden (Cornwall)	phrase used to calm babies
pitching (Bristol, Somerset, Wiltshire)	settling (of snow) on the ground
plim up; plimmed (North Somerset, west Hampshire)	swell up; swollen
poached up; poaching up (North Somerset but also recently heard on The Archers)	cutting up, of a field; as in "the ground's poaching up".
proper job (Devon, Cornwall, Dorset, Somerset, Isle of Wight)	something done well; also, a general expression of satisfaction.
pummy (Dorset)	Apple pumace from the cider-wring (either from pumace or French pomme meaning apple)
scag (North Somerset)	to tear or catch ("I've scagged me jeans on thacky barbed wire. I've scagged me 'ook up 'round down 'by Swyre 'ed")
scrage	a scratch or scrape usually on a limb BBC Voices Project
scrope (Dorset)	to move awkwardly or clumsily through overgrowth or vegetation
skew-whiff (Dorset & Devon)	crooked, slanting, awry
slit pigs (North Somerset)	male piglets that have been castrated
smooth (Bristol & Somerset)	to stroke or pet (e.g. cat or dog)
sound (Devon & North Gloucestershire)	many meanings, but mainly an interjection to communicate gratitude, appreciation, and/or mutual respect.
somewhen (Dorset, Isle of Wight)	At some time (still very commonly used). Occasionally used elsewhere, though considered informal, it has an equivalent in German as irgendwann.
sprieve (Wiltshire)	dry after a bath, shower, or swim by evaporation.
spuddle (Devon)	to attempt to stir up trouble. e.g. "That's not true, you spuddlin' bugger" or "you spuddler"!
thic (Dorset, North Somerset)	that — said knowingly, to make the dialect deliberately stronger or more emotional. e.g. "Get in thic bed!"
thic/thac/they; thiccy/thaccy/they (Devon, Dorset, Somerset, Wiltshire)	this, that, those. e.g. "Put'n in thic yer box" ("Put it in this box here"); "Whad'v'ee done wi' thaccy pile o'dashels?" ("What have thee [you] done with that pile of thistles?")
tinklebob (Dorset)	an icicle.
wambling (Dorset)	wandering, aimless (see: A Pair of Blue Eyes by Thomas Hardy)
wuzzer/wazzin (Exeter)	Was she?/Was he?
Where's it to? (Cornwall, Dorset, Devon, Somerset, Wiltshire)	Where is it? e.g. "Dorchester, where's it to? It's in Dorset."
wopsy (Devon & Dorset)	a wasp.
young'un	any young person; "Ow be young un?" or "Where bist goin' youngun?" (lit. "Where be you going, you one?")
zat (Devon)	soft

Some dialect words now appear mainly, or solely, in place names, such as "batch" (a North Somerset hill, but more commonly applied to Coalmine spoil heaps e.g. Camerton batch, Farrington batch, Braysdown batch), "tyning", "hoe" (a bay). The suffix "-coombe" is quite commonly used in West Country place names (not so much in Cornwall) and means "valley".

=== Grammar ===
- The second person singular thee (or ye) and thou forms used, thee often contracted to 'ee.
- Bist may be used instead of are for the second person, e.g.: how bist? ("how are you?") This has its origins in the Old English – or Anglo-Saxon – language; compare the modern German Wie bist du? (a literal translation of "How are you?", not used as a greeting).
- Use of masculine (rather than neuter) pronouns with non-animate referents, e.g.: put'ee over there ("put it over there") and 'e's a nice scarf ("That's a nice scarf").
- An a- prefix may be used to denote the past participle; a-went ("gone").
- Use of they in conjunction with plural nouns, where Standard English demands those e.g.: They shoes are mine ("Those shoes are mine" / "They are mine"). This is also used in Modern Scots but differentiated thae meaning those and thay the plural of he, she and it, both from the Anglo-Saxon þā 'they/those', the plural form of sē 'he/that', sēo 'she/that' and þæt 'it/that'.
- In other areas, be may be used exclusively in the present tense, often in the present continuous; Where be you going to? ("Where are you going?")
- The use of to to denote location. Where's that to? ("Where's that [at]?"). This is something that can still be heard often, unlike many other characteristics. This former usage is common to Newfoundland English, where many of the island's modern-day descendants have West Country origins — particularly Bristol — as a result of the 17th–19th century migratory fishery.
- Use of the past tense writ where Standard English uses wrote. e.g.: I writ a letter ("I wrote a letter").
- Nominative pronouns as indirect objects. For instance, Don't tell I, tell'ee! ("Don't tell me, tell him!"), "'ey give I fifty quid and I zay no, giv'ee to charity inztead" ("They gave me £50 and I said no, give it to charity instead"). When in casual Standard English the oblique case is used, in the West Country dialect the object of many a verb takes the nominative case.

== Social stigma and future of the dialect ==
Owing to the West Country's agricultural history, the West Country accent has for centuries been associated with farming, and consequently with a lack of education and rustic simplicity. This can be seen in literature as early as the 18th century, for instance in Richard Brinsley Sheridan's play The Rivals, set in the Somerset city of Bath.

As more and more of the English population moved into towns and cities during the 20th century, non-regional, Standard English accents increasingly became a marker of personal social mobility. Universal primary education was also an important factor as it made it possible for some to move out of their rural environments into situations where other modes of speech were current.

A West Country accent continues to be a reason for denigration and stereotype:

The people of the South West have long endured the cultural stereotype of 'ooh arr'ing carrot-crunching yokels, and Bristol in particular has fought hard to shake this image off

— Anonymous editorial, Bristol Post, 7 August 2008

In the early part of the twentieth century, the journalist and writer Albert John Coles used the pseudonym Jan Stewer (a character from the folk song Widecombe Fair) to pen a long-running series of humorous articles and correspondences in Devon dialect for the Western Morning News. These now preserve a record of the dialect as recalled with affection in the period. The tales perpetuate – albeit sympathetically – the rustic uneducated stereotype as the protagonist experiences the modern world.

There is a popular prejudice that stereotypes speakers as unsophisticated and even backward, due possibly to the deliberate and lengthened nature of the accent. This can work to the West Country speaker's advantage, however: recent studies of how trustworthy Britons find their fellows based on their regional accents put the West Country accent high up, under southern Scottish English but a long way above Cockney and Scouse. Recent polls put the West Country accent as third and fifth most attractive in the British Isles respectively.

The West Country accent is probably most represented in film as "pirate speech" – that cartoon-like "Ooh arr, me 'earties! Sploice the mainbrace!" way of talking is very similar. This may be a result of the strong (both legal and outlawed) seafaring and fisherman tradition of the West Country. Edward Teach (Blackbeard) was a native of Bristol, and privateer and English hero Sir Francis Drake hailed from Tavistock in Devon. Gilbert and Sullivan's operetta The Pirates of Penzance may also have added to the association. West Country native Robert Newton's performance in the 1950 Disney film Treasure Island is credited with popularising the stereotypical West Country "pirate voice". Newton's strong West Country accent also featured in Blackbeard the Pirate (1952).

== See also ==
- Bristolian dialect
- Cornish dialect
- Cornish language
- Dorset dialect
- History of the English language
- International Talk Like a Pirate Day
- Shakespeare In Original Pronunciation
- Janner
- Jan Stewer
- Late West Saxon
- List of Cornish dialect words
- Mummerset
- Newfoundland English
- South West England
