= Janner =

Colloquial term for a resident of Plymouth

Janner is an English regional nickname associated with Plymouth both as a noun and as an adjective for the local accent and dialect. In 1987 Cyril Tawney, in his book Grey Funnel Lines, described its meaning as "a person from Devon", deriving from Cousin Jan (the Devon form of John), but "more particularly in naval circles anyone from the Plymouth area". The term was also used for members of the Devonshire and Dorset Regiment.

From March 1902 until November 1905 the Devon and Exeter Gazette ran a series "The Talk at Uncle Tom Cobleigh's Club", partly comic, partly serious, written in the Devonshire dialect. A second series was created by A. J. Coles and published in the (Illustrated) Western Weekly News from July 1905 until the paper ceased publication in October 1939. The series was continued in the Western Times and Gazette until 1964. Both series included the character Jan Stewer (a character from Widecombe Fair) who recounted his experiences of the modern world in Devon dialect. Coles's mother was from Willand in Devon. The first series sparked a popular correspondence from Devon natives around the world written in affectionate dialect as recollected at the time, the character even appearing on the BBC in the 1920s.

'Alf a pound of flour and lard,
Makes a lovely clacker,
Just enough for you and me,
Oh Brother Janner,
Oh 'ow 'appy uz shall be!,
When uz gets to the Westcountry!,
Whur the oggies grows on trees,
Oh Brother Janner.

— A version of an Oggie Song from Devonport, c. 1951.

Because of the changes in the local economy in Plymouth over the course of the 1980s and 1990s, from the Royal Navy being the major employer to Plymouth being a university city housing a large number of students from outside the city, the term has developed an additional secondary pejorative sense describing the locals.

The Member of Parliament for Plymouth, Devonport, Alison Seabeck, showed her ignorance of the term in 2005 when, while still a candidate, she was asked by the local paper: "What is a Janner?" The Express on Sunday reported her reply:

The flustered candidate wailed: "I don't know. You're not going to print this, are you?" Unfortunately they did. The answer is a "Plymothian".

For many years there was a cartoon in the Plymouth Evening Herald entitled 'The Janners'. Many pamphlets circulate with mischievous amusing and sometimes erotic anthologies and there are short dictionaries of Janner vocabulary, e.g. the Janner TextBook.

The term features in the football team Plymouth Argyle supporters' chants, particularly its variant on the folksong Oggy Land, and in 2010 it was used in a television advertisement for Aviva Car Insurance in which Paul Whitehouse as a Plymouth Argyle supporter driving to an away match exhorts a potential passenger to "geddon you Janner". In April 2012 a new rugby league trophy called the Barum Janner cup was introduced for competition matches between Barnstaple's North Devon Raiders and the Plymouth Titans. The cup's name is a combination of the nicknames for inhabitants of the two places.

== See also ==
- List of British regional nicknames
