= Apparent time =

Apparent time may refer to:

- Apparent-time hypothesis, sociolinguistic hypothesis that age-based variation may indicate linguistic change in progress
- Apparent solar time, a reckoning of the passage of time based on the position of the sun as seen by an observer on Earth
