= Age-graded variation =

Age-associated differences in speech habits in a community

In linguistics, age-graded variation is differences in speech habits within a community that are associated with age. Age-grading occurs when individuals change their linguistic behavior throughout their lifetimes, but the community as a whole does not change.

== Definition ==
The term “age-grading” was first introduced by anthropologist/linguist Charles F. Hockett, but has been defined as it is used today by sociolinguist William Labov, who identified it as an individual linguistic change against a backdrop of community stability. Age-grading is not limited to changes at any one particular stage in life, but can be studied in the way that babies, adolescents, young adults, and the elderly speak.

Age-grading involves the use of stable sociolinguistic variables, or features that are not currently undergoing any linguistic change. Linguistic features that are age-graded typically are stigmatized or have a high degree of social awareness and can be consciously controlled. For this reason, age-graded variables tend to be semantic (e.g., an entire word) as opposed to phonetic. Age-graded changes recur at a particular age in successive generations and are regular and predictable changes. These changes are thought to mark developmental/maturational stages in the individual’s life.

=== The classic age-grading pattern ===
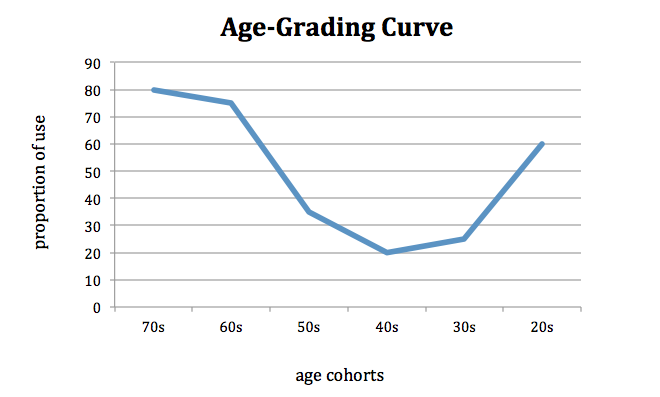
An idealized pattern of age-graded change

The expected pattern is a u- or v-shaped curve (see figure to the right). Nonprestigious age-graded linguistic features tend to peak during adolescence “when peer group pressure not to conform to society’s norms is greatest” (Holmes 1992:184). The use of standard or prestige forms peaks between the ages of 30 and 55. When people reach middle age, they tend to follow societal norms more because that is when the societal pressure to conform is greatest. At this stage of life, people become more conservative and use the fewest vernacular forms. Nonprestigious forms may resurface in old age when people are out of the workforce and social pressures are reduced.

== Age-grading and the apparent-time hypothesis ==
Age-graded variation stands in contrast to the apparent-time hypothesis, which assumes that an individual’s vernacular does not change once they are past adolescence. According to the apparent-time hypothesis, age-stratified variation is often indicative of a linguistic change in progress. For example, if in a survey of a population, patterned differences between the speech of individuals 75 years old, 50 years old, and 25 years old may indicate changes that have occurred over the past 50 years. This presents a problem when studying age-graded variation because age-grading relies on individuals changing their speech patterns throughout their lives. The applicability of age-graded variation should be confirmed by real-time evidence. This can come from a longitudinal study, which tracks the same people.

== Age-grading in different age groups ==
=== Children/adolescents ===
When children first learn their language, they learn language in the way of their mother and/or primary caretakers. Vernacular reorganization occurs when children adopt a norm that is different from the one they have acquired. This happens in the preadolescent and adolescent years and is necessary for linguistic change to advance.

It is not uncommon for adolescents to have certain linguistic variation in their speech. Adolescence is a transitional period when children become adults and move away from their family identity to express themselves as individuals. During this period, age-segregated networks form, giving rise to age-graded variation. Adolescents tend to lead with an increased use of vernacular and linguistic variables to differentiate themselves from the adult population.

When studies began to include younger age groups, researchers (e.g. Ash 1982; Cedergren 1973, 1988) discovered that the frequency of incoming linguistic changes is highest among 15- to 17-year-olds, but lower among 11- to 14-year-olds and people in their twenties. This is called the adolescent peak.

=== Adults ===
Adults have been shown to be more conservative in their use of linguistic variables. This has been attributed to the desired use of standard language which is used in the workplace. Adolescents tend to use more slang and swear words, but these features recede as they become adults. This phenomenon is known as sociolectal retrenchment.

=== Older adults/elderly ===
Although middle-aged adults have conservative speech as mentioned above, older adults tend to have less formal speech. Older women who have passed the years of childbearing shed some of the conservatism in their speech. Similarly, older men who are past the age of retirement and no longer in the workforce also have less formal speech because of reduced social pressure to conform.

== Studies/examples ==
=== Zed vs. zee ===
J.K. Chambers cites an example from southern Ontario, Canada. The last letter of the English alphabet is called zed everywhere in the English-speaking world except for the United States, where it is known as zee. Though the use of zee is stigmatized in southern Ontario, children learn it this way because of the alphabet song that rhymes zee with vee. Surveys in southern Ontario show a higher proportion of young people who produce zee compared to older people. In a Toronto survey in 1979, two-thirds of the twelve-year-olds completed their recitation of the alphabet with zee but only 8 percent of adults did so. In 1991, when those twelve-year-olds were twenty-five, another survey showed that 39 percent of twenty- to twenty-five-year-olds said zee. This pattern of declining use of zee repeats itself in succeeding generations in southern Ontario.

=== Glottal stops in Glasgow ===
In Scotland and Northern England, children’s use of the glottal stop [ʔ], in place of /t/ is described as “the most openly stigmatised feature.” The glottal stop can occur in any non-initial post-tonic position and excludes words like time and tide, since the /t/ is word-initial, and in words like pretend and patella, where it is pre-tonic. Examples where a glottal stop can replace a /t/ include words like better, city, dirty, football, hitting, and water. Children in Scotland and Northern England soon learn that the use of the glottal stop is considered inferior to the use of /t/ and are taught to correct themselves from an early age. Variation between the glottal stop and /t/ is mostly seen within the middle class due to pressure from adults. This case study provides an illustration of what Labov has identified as a “principle of transmission” (Labov 2001:437). He explains that “at some stage of socialization...children learn that variants favored in informal speech are associated with lower social status in the wider community.” Because of this, there is pressure to stop the use of the glottal stop by adolescence. However, since they are class-insensitive, children cannot be stopped from learning the glottal stop variant during childhood.

=== Instant messaging variants ===
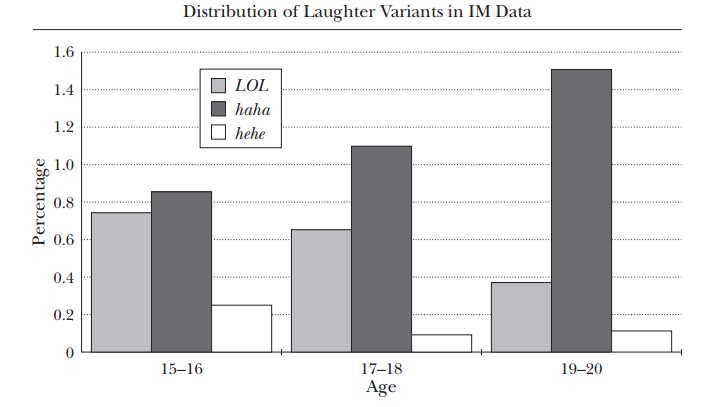
Distribution of laughter variants in IM data

The use of instant messaging variants lol, haha, and hehe provides a contemporary example of age-grading among adolescents. As shown in the figure to the right, the use of lol declines systematically according to age, with the youngest people using it the most frequently. Use of the more conservative form haha increases according to age. Older adolescents become aware that lol is used by a younger group and consciously reduce their use of the form.

== See also ==
- Variation (linguistics)
- Apparent-time hypothesis
