= Mummerset =

Stereotypical West Country English accent

Mummerset is a fictional English dialect supposedly spoken in a rustic English county of the same name. Mummerset is used by actors to represent a stereotypical English West Country accent while not specifically referencing any particular county.

The name is a portmanteau of mummer (an archaic term for a folk actor) and Somerset, a largely rural county.

Mummerset draws on a mixture of characteristics of real dialects from the West Country, such as rhoticism, forward-shifted diphthongs, lengthened vowels, and the voicing of word-initial consonants that are voiceless in other English dialects. Word-initial "S" is replaced with "Z"; "F" is replaced with "V". It also uses perceived dialect grammar, replacing instances of "am", "are" and "is" with "be". The sentence "I haven't seen him, that farmer, since Friday" could be parsed in Mummerset as "Oi ain't zeen 'im that be varmer zince Vroiday".

Some speakers of East Anglian English have objected to media portrayals of characters from that area speaking in "a strange kind of stage Mummerset", as in the TV adaptation of P.D. James' Adam Dalgliesh novel Devices and Desires.

== In literature ==
A speech from Edgar in Shakespeare's King Lear, before his fight with Oswald in Act IV, scene 6, has been described as an example of mummerset:

Good gentleman, go your gait, and let poor volk pass. An ’chud ha’ bin
zwagger’d out of my life, ’t would not ha’bin zo long as ’tis by a vortnight. Nay, come not
near th’ old man; keep out, ’che vor ye, or Ise try whether your costard or my
ballow be the harder. ’Chill be plain with you.

== See also ==
- Farmer Palmer
- Mockney
