= Real-time sociolinguistics =

Real-time sociolinguistics is a sociolinguistic research method concerned with observing linguistic variation and change in progress via longitudinal studies. Real-time studies track linguistic variables over time by collecting data from a speech community at multiple points in a given period. As a result, it provides empirical evidence for either stability or linguistic change.

Real-time sociolinguistics contrasts with apparent-time sociolinguistics, which surveys different generations of a population at one point in time. A theoretical model of language change in apparent time is built and based on the distribution of the linguistic variable across age groups in a speech community.

Although apparent-time studies are more numerous than real-time studies, the latter have seen an increase in number since 1995, often in the form of restudies of 1960s and 1970s research.

== Advantages ==
Real-time methods address and resolve problematic assumptions of the apparent-time hypothesis.

=== Adult lifespan changes ===
The apparent-time hypothesis assumes that an individual's speech is relatively stable over his or her adult lifetime and so each generation of speakers reflects the state of the language when the individual first acquired language as a child. Generational comparisons can then be made to study linguistic change. However, that assumption is undermined by the observation of the occurrence of lifespan change in many cases. Individual speakers "change over their lifespans in the direction of a change in progress in the rest of the community." Because older speakers may have changes in language, apparent-time studies systematically underestimate the rate of change. Real-time methods do not make assumptions about the stability of older speakers' speech, but data about the speakers' speech over time are gathered directly. Therefore, real-time studies do not have the problem of underestimation.

=== Age-graded variation ===
An entire speech community may exhibit age-graded variation, linguistic differences that emerge among different generations as the result of age, rather than actual language change. Therefore, apparent-time sociolinguistics studies do not definitively indicate that linguistic change is underway in a given speech community.

In real-time analyses, one may test for age-grading by comparing the speech habits of participants at multiple points in time. If the speech habits have not changed, the apparent-time hypothesis is supported. If the speech habits correlate with certain ages, rather than speakers, the speech exhibits age-graded variation.

=== Rate of language change ===
Real-time studies are crucial because changes do not necessarily occur in stable, progressive increments that can be documented synchronically, as is assumed in the apparent-time hypothesis. Language change may occur quickly as a result of social changes. That was the case in the dialects of some island communities, such as Smith Island. Language change occurred rapidly on the island and completed within one or two generations. Apparent-time studies, which document only data from one point in time, would not have been able to capture that case of rapid change. Real-time study methods are more favorable over apparent-time methods because the change is more easily detected and is documented in smaller discrete increments.

=== Effects of social changes ===
Real-time studies can also capture subtle language changes that result from social shifts within the community. Apparent-time studies can assume correlations only between linguistic changes and social factors, but such changes can be directly witnessed in real-time studies.

== Disadvantages ==
=== Constraints on time ===
Sociolinguistics is a relatively new field and in many cases not enough time has elapsed to gather adequate information on the same speech community over an extended period of time.

Similarly, researchers do not favor real-time sociolinguistics studies because of the time commitment to one project and delayed gratification. Because of the nature of the studies, researchers must wait many years before they can collect enough data for analysis. Often, researchers will not even get to see the results of their data. That lack of fulfillment makes linguists often opt for apparent-time studies instead. They may also motivated by the common university practice of rewarding "more quickly achieved publications rather than 'research in progress.'"

=== Changes in population ===
While a study is in progress, changes may occur in the group of participants being surveyed. A speech community may change over time because of speakers passing or relocating or social conditions changing. Dramatic change in the demographics of a community would likely have a significant effect on linguistic patterns and so a study may end up reflecting a change in demographic population, rather than linguistic change.

The continued participation of the subjects is also not guaranteed. If the researchers were to add new speakers to replace speakers who are no longer in the speech community, they would be altering the original speech community. Such alterations would undermine the basis of the real-time study approach, which depends on the use of the same speech community over time to collect reliable and representative data.

=== Issues with comparability ===
Old and new studies may not be able to be directly compared. Different research projects have different interview conditions, instrumental measurements, data extraction methodologies, and research aims. For example, if the more recent study uses data collection technology that was not yet developed at the time of the older study, there will be a discrepancy between the two sets of data.

== Approaches and methodologies ==
Diagram showing different research options in sociolinguistics, including real-time studies (Tillery and Bailey 2003), which encompass several subcategories.

=== Using existing evidence ===
The methodology of using existing evidence involves the comparison of a new study to a previous one or to some other form of evidence. That approach to real-time sociolinguistics is more efficient and cost-effective than resurveys, but it has weaknesses, which are mostly issues with comparability.

=== Resurveys ===
Resurveys can solve the limitations that may arise from using existing evidence, but they can be affected by changes in population. The two primary types of resurveys are trend surveys and panel surveys.

In a trend survey, or replication study, the same population is resurveyed at a later point in time by using the same data collection methods and analysis techniques as in the original survey. However, a large population can pose potential problems, such as demographic change.

A panel survey, on the other hand, follows the same group of individuals throughout the whole study and reinterviewing them over the period of the study. Such studies are not affected by demographic change because they examine change in the speech of individuals. However, they are affected by age-grading and the relocation or the passing of the individuals in the sample.

== Examples ==
A pair of graphs illustrating the age distribution of the use of r in the speech of sales personnel at Saks Fifth Avenue and Macy's in the 1962 and 1986 studies. Note that, in both stores, the general age pattern remained the same in both years.

=== Martha's Vineyard ===
William Labov's 1963 study of /ay/ and /aw/ diphthong centralization in Martha's Vineyard has been revisited by other researchers in the following decades. One such study was Renée Blake and Meredith Josey's 2003 study in which they performed an analysis of the variable (ay) by using more recent acoustic and social techniques. Upon comparing their data to the existing evidence from Labov, the authors found no more presence of /ay/ centralization, which suggested a possible reversal of the change cited by Labov.

In 2002, Jennifer Pope conducted a trend study that more faithfully reproduced Labov's original survey methods and sampling procedure. Contrary to Blake and Josey's findings, Pope found that the change was in fact continuing, with signs of recession showing only for the youngest speakers. Pope, Myerhoff, and Ladd concluded from their real-time evidence that Labov's apparent-time construct had provided a valid representation of linguistic change.

=== New York City department store trend survey ===
In 1962, Labov conducted a study on the stratification of the linguistic variable /r/ in New York City. Labov surveyed sales personnel of three different department stores of varying prestige rankings: Saks Fifth Avenue (high-end), Macy's (mid-range), and S. Klein (low-end). He found a correlation between the speakers in higher-ranked stores and higher rates of constricted /r/. Labov concluded from the survey that the age distribution of constricted /r/ reflected a linguistic shift toward the prestige variant.

Joy Fowler replicated the study more than two decades later in 1986 by resampling the population and following Labov's methodology as closely as possible but substituting Mays for S. Klein, which had gone out of business. Fowler's results demonstrated an increased rate of the use of /r/ in the 1986 sample for all three stores, which supported Labov's hypothesis that there had been a linguistic shift toward the adoption of the prestige variant. Furthermore, Fowler found similar age-based patterns in her findings, which lent evidence to the influence of age-graded variation in the distribution of the variable.

Another scholar, Patrick-André Mather, replicated Labov's original study in 2009, this time replacing S. Klein with Filene's Basement and Loehmann's, as both S. Klein and Mays had shut down their department stores by then. Although the distribution patterns of /r/ remained the same as for the two previous studies in terms of stylistic, social, and phonological variables (word-final vs. preobstruent), Mather (2012) noted significant increases in the overall percentages by some 10 to 20 percent as well as important differences in terms of the age distribution. The 2009 study suggests that lower-middle-class younger speakers dropped the /r/ considerably less than older speakers, contrary to Labov's original survey. In addition, Mather (2012) found that although African American informants used less word-final /r/ than whites, especially in the preobstruent position, they followed the general pattern of stylistic and social differentiation according to the store. That suggested that African Americans are moving toward greater integration within the New York City speech community.

=== Springville panel survey ===
There had been ongoing linguistic fieldwork for over a decade from 1984 to 1995 in Springville, a rural Texas community with a majority African American and Hispanic population and a minority white population. In an effort to track the progression of African American Vernacular English (AAVE) features in the region, more than 100 residents had their speech recorded throughout this period in various interview contexts. These interview contexts included individual, group, site study, and diary study; approximately two-thirds of the subjects were interviewed at least twice. That effectively generated documentation of 100 years of Springville speech in apparent time. The real-time surveying of the subjects revealed many linguistic changes, such as an increasing divergence of features in AAVE and Southern White Vernacular English (SWVE), another local dialect.

=== Queen Elizabeth II's Christmas broadcasts ===
In 2000, Jonathan Harrington, Sallyanne Palethorpe, and Catherine Watson conducted an acoustic analysis of Queen Elizabeth II's vowel pronunciation in her Christmas broadcasts between 1952 and 1988, which was an important examination of a single individual's pronunciation in a similar setting over a long period of time. They examined the Queen's pronunciation of stressed monophthongs in nine broadcasts from three time periods (the 1950s, the 1960s and the early 1970s, and the 1980s) and compared her pronunciation to that of female BBC broadcasters from the 1980s. They found evidence that the Queen's pronunciation of vowels had shifted over the course of the time period they examined and that the shift was in the direction of the other women's pronunciation. That study provided evidence that countered the fundamental base of the apparent-time hypothesis in which "a speaker's accent does not change much in adulthood."

== See also ==
- Age-graded variation
- Apparent-time hypothesis
- Apparent-time sociolinguistics
- Diachronic linguistics (historical linguistics)
- Longitudinal studies
