= Variation (linguistics) =

Concept in linguistics

Variation is a characteristic of language: there is more than one way of saying the same thing in a given language. Variation can exist in domains such as pronunciation (e.g., more than one way of pronouncing the same phoneme or the same word), lexicon (e.g., multiple words with the same meaning), grammar (e.g., different syntactic constructions expressing the same grammatical function), and other features. Different communities or individuals speaking the same language may differ from each other in their choices of which of the available linguistic features to use, and how often (inter-speaker variation), and the same speaker may make different choices on different occasions (intra-speaker variation).

While diversity of variation exists, there are also some general boundaries on variation. For instance, speakers across distinct dialects of a language tend to preserve the same word order or fit new sounds into the language's established inventory of phonemes (the study of such restrictions known as phonotactics, morphotactics, etc.); however, exceptions to these restrictions are possible too. Linguistic variation does not equate to ungrammatical usage of the language, but speakers are still (often unconsciously) sensitive to what is and is not possible in their native lect.

Language variation is a core concept in sociolinguistics. Sociolinguists investigate how linguistic variation can be influenced by differences in the social characteristics and circumstances of the speakers using the language, but also investigate whether elements of the surrounding linguistic context promote or inhibit the usage of certain structures.

Variation is an essential component of language change. This is because language change is gradual; a language does not shift from one state to another instantaneously, but old and new linguistic features coexist for a period of time in variation with each other, as new variants gradually increase in frequency and old variants decline. Variationists therefore study language change by observing variation while a change is in progress. However, not all variation is involved in change; it is possible for competing ways of "saying the same thing" to coexist with each other in "stable variation" for an extended period of time.

Studies of language variation and its correlation with sociological categories, such as William Labov's 1963 paper "The social motivation of a sound change," led to the foundation of sociolinguistics as a subfield of linguistics. Although contemporary sociolinguistics includes other topics, language variation and change remains an important issue at the heart of the field.

== Sociolinguistic variables ==
Studies in the field of sociolinguistics typically take a sample population and interview them, assessing the realisation of certain sociolinguistic variables. Labov specifies the ideal sociolinguistic variable to

- be high in frequency,
- have a certain immunity from conscious suppression,
- be an integral part of larger structures, and
- be easily quantified on a linear scale.

Phonetic variables tend to meet these criteria and are often used, as are morphosyntactic variables, morphophonological variables, and, more rarely, lexical variables. Examples for phonetic variables are: the frequency of the glottal stop, the height or backness of a vowel or the realisation of word-endings. An example of a morphosyntactic variable is the frequency of negative concord (known colloquially as a double negative). Two well-known and frequently studied morphophonological variables are T/D deletion, the optional deletion of the sound /t/ or /d/ at the end of a word, as in "I kep' walking" (Wolfram 1969; Labov et al. 1968); and the ING variable, the optional pronunciation of -ing at the end of a word as -in', as in "I kept walkin'" (e.g. Fisher 1958; Labov 1966/1982; Trudgill 1974).

== Analysis and methodology ==
Analyzing sociolinguistic variation often involves the use of statistical programs to handle its multi-variable nature. One essential part of the methodology is to count up the number of tokens of a particular variant and compare it to the number of times the variant could have occurred. This is called the "Principle of Accountability" in Tagliamonte (2012). Comparing the tokens to the total number of words in a corpus or comparing one corpus to another leads to erroneous results. This count of the possible occurrences can be difficult at times because some variants alternate with zero (such as relative pronouns that, who, and zero).

In 1970 Eugenio Coșeriu, revisiting De Saussure's synchrony and diachrony distinction in the description of language, coined the terms diatopic (place-related dialect), diastratic (social class/stratum related sociolect) and diaphasic (formality-related register) to describe linguistic variation. In 1985, Peter Koch and Wulf Oesterreicher expanded this system to include diamesic variation, which describes linguistic variation based on oral and written conceptions of language.

== Association with age ==
There are several different types of age-based variation one may see within a population. They are: vernacular of a subgroup with membership typically characterized by a specific age range, age-graded variation, and indications of linguistic change in progress.

One example of subgroup vernacular is the speech of street youth. Just as street youth dress differently from the "norm", they also often have their own "language". The reasons for this are the following: (1) To enhance their own cultural identity (2) To identify with each other, (3) To exclude others, and (4) To invoke feelings of fear or admiration from the outside world. Strictly speaking, this is not truly age-based, since it does not apply to all individuals of that age bracket within the community. Age-graded variation is a stable variation which varies within a population based on age. That is, speakers of a particular age will use a specific linguistic form in successive generations. This is relatively rare. J.K. Chambers cites an example from southern Ontario, Canada where the name of the letter 'Z' varies. Most of the English-speaking world pronounces it 'zed'; however, in the United States, it is pronounced 'zee'. A linguistic survey found that in 1979 two-thirds of the 12-year-olds in Toronto ended the recitation of the alphabet with the letter 'zee' where only 8% of the adults did so. Then in 1991, (when those 12-year-olds were in their mid-20s) a survey showed only 39% of the 20- to 25-year-olds used 'zee'. In fact, the survey showed that only 12% of those over 30 used the form 'zee'. This is hypothesized to be tied to an American children's song frequently used to teach the alphabet. In this song, the rhyme scheme matches the letter Z with V 'vee', prompting the use of the American pronunciation. As the individual grows older, this marked form 'zee' is dropped in favor of the standard form 'zed'.

People tend to use linguistic forms that were prevalent when they reached adulthood. So, in the case of linguistic change in progress, one would expect to see variation over a broader range of ages. William Bright provides an example taken from American English, where in certain parts of the country there is an ongoing merger of the vowel sounds in such pairs of words as 'caught' and 'cot'. This merger used to be distinctive of the western United States, but since World War II, it has developed independently in two other regions: western Pennsylvania and southwestward, and the New England coast from Boston north. Examining the speech across several generations of a single family, one would find the grandparents' generation would never or rarely merge these two vowel sounds; their children's generation may on occasion, particularly in quick or informal speech; while their grandchildren's generation would merge these two vowels uniformly. This is the basis of the apparent-time hypothesis where age-based variation is taken as an indication of linguistic change in progress.

== Association with geography ==
A commonly studied source of variation is regional dialects (regiolects). Dialectology studies variations in language based primarily on geographic distribution and their associated features. Sociolinguists concerned with grammatical and phonological features that correspond to regional areas are often called dialectologists.

In 1968, John J. Gumperz conducted a survey on the inter-influence of geographic and social factors. By the end of the 1960s, it was examined that linguistic and dialect diversity cannot be solely interpreted by geography, which social differences existed in the same geographical area. Thus, social and geographical factors were to be seen as interrelated.

== Association with gender ==
Men and women, on average, tend to use slightly different language styles. These differences tend to be quantitative rather than qualitative. That is, to say that women use a particular speaking style more than men do is akin to saying that men are taller than women (i.e., men are on average taller than women, but some women are taller than some men).

The initial identification of a women's register was by Robin Lakoff in 1975, who argued that the style of language served to maintain women's (inferior) role in society ("female deficit approach"). A later refinement of this argument was that gender differences in language reflected a power difference ("dominance theory"). However, both these perspectives have the language style of men as normative, implying that women's style is inferior.

More recently, Deborah Tannen has compared gender differences in language as more similar to 'cultural' differences ("cultural difference approach"). Comparing conversational goals, she argued that men have a report style, aiming to communicate factual information, whereas women have a rapport style, more concerned with building and maintaining relationships.

People tend to accommodate their language towards the style of the person they are interacting with. Thus, in a mixed-gender group, gender differences tend to be less pronounced. A similarly important observation is that this accommodation is usually towards the language style, not the gender of the person . That is, a polite and empathic male will tend to be accommodated to on the basis of their being polite and empathic, rather than their being male.

== Association with race ==
=== African American English (AAE) ===
Communities of African Americans and Whites have been popular groups with particular attention to their linguistic variation. This variation helps inform much about the origins and evolution of other varieties, especially African American English. Understanding the sociohistorical background of the settlement of the southern colonies is a crucial step in understanding the origins of AAE. African American English and Southern White American English both had origins in the British settler dialects introduced into the South within the Colonial Period (1607 and 1776). With time these two varieties continued to evolve and influences one another. However, research on African American English did not become continuously and overwhelming explored until the 1960s and 1970s with many linguists including Robbins Burling, Ralph Fasold, Joey Dillard, William Labov, Williams Stewart, Geneva Smitherman, and Walt Wolfram to name a few. While African American English is still not considered an official variety by the dominant culture and educational system in the United States, it is a legitimate and verified variety by many scholars. The Ebonics Controversy help to influence the way America thinks about African American English. In December 1996 the Ebonics Controversy erupted from the Oakland School Board's resolution to identify Ebonics as the first language of African American students with consequences for their Language Arts lessons. There have been many different perspectives to engaging with African American English as a variety. Although there is some evidence that linguistically sensitive approaches are helpful, there are gaps in and questions about these approaches which require new research. However, AAE is a rule-governed, valid language variety that adequately and uniquely expresses the collective experiences of its speakers.

=== Asian English ===
Very little attention has been paid to Asian American speech despite the rise in Asian American immigrants to the United States. Even though Asian Americans are perceived as a distinct racial group, their speech has not been categorized as an individualized ethnolect. Asian Americans in particular, especially East Asian Americans and some South Asian Americans, have been seen as the "model minority", whereby they are stereotyped as being comparable to whites in academic achievement and economic success. However, this assumption neglects Asian Americans who are less fortunate and may experience poverty. Furthermore, the term "Asian American" covers a vast diaspora of individuals from various national and ethnic origins, including those from Southeast Asia, Central Asia and the Middle East, yet Asian Americans are often treated as a single entity, which is problematic due to their distinct cultural and national backgrounds, as well as their history of immigration to the United States. Therefore, research on Asian American speech is often homogenized because of racial homogenization; research on Asian Americans in particular has noted the variation of Asian American speech. Affluent Vietnamese Americans and middle-class Japanese Americans are shown to align to more standard English varieties, while Laotians and other Southeast Asians have more vernacular speech patterns. Ito (2010) looked at bilingual Hmong Americans in Wisconsin and found that local features like the low-back vowel merger did not seem to play a noticeable role in Hmong English. Despite the variety of ethnic background, Asian American speech shows distinctiveness in perception tests. Michael Newman and Angela Wu found that in perception tests, participants regardless of ethnic background were found to recognize Asian American, indexed by a set of distinctive features. While the amount of sound change studies are dearth, when they are addressed, it is focused mainly on "language maintenance issues or code switching", and rarely feature linguistic portraits of Asian Americans who have grown up within the diverse atlas of the United States.

== See also ==
- Dialect
- Free variation
- Language change
- Speech community
- Variable rules analysis
- Variety (linguistics)
