= Tyning =

Tyning is a name-element occurring commonly in north-east Somerset, England—most of all in the Bath area, though also as far as Cheddar in the south-west, and over the borders into Wiltshire and Gloucestershire. It is used of three woodlands, of several farms, and also in at least a score of street names, as well as the names of schools in Staple Hill and in Henbury in Bristol (e.g. The Tynings School), and in the name used of a part of the town of Radstock. There are outlying uses in Sussex and Ulster, and in street names in Droitwich, Walsall, and Wolverhampton.

The manner of its use suggests that it is or was a common noun, but its meaning is obscure. The word may derive from the meaning to "enclose with a hedge or fence; to fence, to hedge in" given for the verb 'tine' or 'tyne' in the Oxford English Dictionary 2nd edition. Richard Verstegan (aka Rowlands), A Restitution of Decayed Intelligence (1605) gives the usages “Betyned. Hedged-about. {W}ee vse yet in some partes of England, to say tyning for hedging.” However, it does not appear in the Oxford English Dictionary, in Chambers, or in the Linguistic Atlas of England (Orton &c, Leeds University Press, London, 1978). Pevsner (The Buildings of England: Bristol and North Somerset, Penguin, 1958) mentions it only in passing, to refer to Tynings Farm above Cheddar, and the Neolithic long barrow (now thought unlikely) and Bronze Age round barrows nearby.
