= Kerning (dairy) =

Ancient Somerset dairy term

Kerning (or ‘kerned’) refers to an ancient Somerset term for ‘thickening’ predominantly used in relation to dairy products. The word has historically been used to refer to the processes around curdling, churning, coagulating or thickening milk, and its origins have been thought to be linked to the verb, ‘to churn’ - which translates to ‘kernen’ in German, ‘karnen’ in Dutch and ‘kirna’ in Old Icelandic.

The word has since been adopted as a synonym to the straining/filtering processes involved in thickening yogurt – the phrase ‘kerned yogurt’ being used to identify products which have been subject to these processes. In correlation with the word’s links to Somerset, ‘kerning’ as a process is used throughout Somersetshire, as a means of producing yogurts with a distinctively thicker consistency.

Traditionally, the kerning process involved placing the yogurt in a muslin cloth and leaving this to drain for a period of time, until the desired consistency had been reached; however, modern-day practises use ultrafiltration to achieve this result . In addition to increasing the consistency, the process serves to boost the protein and also remove some of the lactose (the sugar found naturally in milk).
