= Jan Stewer =

English author

- Born: Albert John Coles; 14 March 1876; Woolwich, London, England, UK
- Died: 18 August 1965 (aged 89); Pathfinder Village, Tedburn St Mary, Devon, England, UK
- Occupations: Writer, humourist, teacher, stage performer, farmer, playwright, actor, hotel proprietor, journalist
- Spouse: Florence Elizabeth Coles (m. 1901; died 1961)
- Children: 4 including Harry Albert Thomas (Harry), Colin Stephens, (Colin), Mary Adelaide Jenny (Mary) and Joan St Ewer (Joan).
- Relatives: William Coles (father); Elizabeth Coles (mother)
- Writing career
- Pen name: Jan Stewer, Bert Coles.

Albert John Coles (also known as Jan Stewer; 14 March 1876 – 18 August 1965) was an English author.

Jan Stewer is generally known in the South West of England as a character in the song "Widecombe Fair", the chorus of which ends with 'Uncle Tom Cobley and all'. This was also the name adopted by Albert John Coles, who, over 64 years, wrote and performed Devonshire dialect stories, plays and songs under this name. He was also (as Mr. A. J. Coles) by turns a schoolteacher, soldier, farmer, managing editor of a newspaper, and "journalist, playwright" (self description in 1939). He was described by John Betjeman, before he was Sir John, as "to be numbered amongst the great understanding humorists". Coles wrote many books, wrote some 5,000 stories for local papers, toured town and village halls with his vaudeville stage acts, wrote, acted and produced plays, (one of which was performed in the Haymarket Theatre in London), acted in films and broadcast on the BBC, in the course of his career as Jan Stewer.

== Timeline ==
=== Early life: Birth until 1898 ===
Known homes: Woolwich (1876), Sandgate (1881) Folkestone (1891, 1892).

Albert John Coles was born on 14 March 1876. His mother was Elizabeth Coles, born Stephens, and his father was Sergeant-Major William Coles of the Royal Artillery. He was born in one of the married quarters of the Woolwich Arsenal.

Elizabeth, his mother, had six children, three of whom survived: Henry William (born Woolwich, 1872), Albert John (Woolwich 1876) and Bertha. (Sandgate, 1883) William Arthur was born in Willand in 1871, died in Woolwich, 1871. Susan Elizabeth, Woolwich, 1874, d. 1875. Third Child, unknown. William Coles had two daughters by a previous marriage, his first wife dying in Mauritius, where he was stationed. His eldest was Williamina Mary, (not Wilhelmina ], known as"Mina". She also named her daughter "Williamina". She was born in Alderney, Channel Islands, in 1863. Jane Louise Elizabeth was born in Mauritius in 1866. She was known to the family as "Louie". She is named Jane L. in the 1871 census, Louisa E. in 1891; "Louisa" in 1881. She married Herbert Webb in 1893.

William and Elizabeth were married on 17 Jan 1869 in Willand, where both were born. Elizabeth Stephens in 1839, William in 1834. Her father, Thomas, was a "Farmer of 55 Acres." in 1851, in 1861 her mother was a widow, "Farmer of 70 Acres." William Coles' father, John Coles, was a (farm) labourer, as William was before enlisting.

Coles attributed his devotion to the county, its language and customs, to his mother. "The county of Devon was the only place on earth for my mother and she often used to tell me about the countryside around Willand and speak to me in the Devon dialect." His son, H.A.T. Coles said his father as a child spent holidays in Devon. It is interesting that of them all only Albert returned to Devon. His father, mother, brother and sister stayed in Kent. Bertha and their mother, Elizabeth were registered as living in the School House, Puddington, in the census of 1901. They presumably came for the wedding of Florence and Albert. No other evidence of interaction known.

Sometime after 1876—and before 1881—William Coles was promoted to the rank of Master Gunner, and put in charge of the Martello Tower constructed from Sandgate Castle, to which the family moved. He was the last Master Gunner. In 1881, at the age of 5 (1881) A. J. Coles was a school pupil, and his half-sister, Tomsa, was a pupil teacher at the British School. A Pupil Teacher in the 19th century was like an apprentice. They taught younger children, under supervision, and so learned the "trade" of teaching, at the same time continuing their own education. They gained qualifications after 5 years. Bertha Coles was born in Sandgate in 1883.

In 1889 they were living in 3, Coolinge Villas, Folkestone, from which home his half-sister, Williamina Mary married Sydney Adolphus Baker. In the census of 1891 they were still living in Coolinge Villas, Grimston Avenue, Folkestone. Coles's other half-sister (now called Louisa) had qualified, and is listed in the census as School Mistress. A. J. Coles had followed his sister and was listed as Pupil Teacher (aged 15). We do not know how old he was when he started his training. In the next year, 1892, he (now 16) gave Pupil Teacher as his occupation on joining his father's regiment. Cock has a different story. He says Coles left school at fourteen, "and was, it is believed, a messenger boy until he had enough money to join his father's regiment." He also says Coles furthered his education at an army school. Coles signed for 12 years, but we do not know how long he served before being invalided out with a weak heart. We do not know how he completed his qualifications to be a teacher. Before 1898 little is known.

== 1898–1908: The Decade of Teaching ==
"You should never have married an actor." .... "I didn't. I married a village schoolmaster."

This decade was unique in the life of Albert Coles. The only comparable periods might be his soldiering experience and his ownership of a farm. We know practically nothing of these periods. He never lost interest in soldiering, keeping involved in training groups and serving in the First World War. He never taught again. He does not seem to speak of his teaching methods until 40 years later in an article called "The Dreadful Dialect". Cock cites passages identical to parts of this article, but amongst a good deal of other material, unfortunately without reference. Perhaps "free use of some of his unpublished memoirs"?. No date is given. He did occasionally write criticisms of the administration of education—particularly the 1902 and 1908 Acts of Parliament.

He seems to have begun this period with the enthusiasms of a young man. His teaching aimed to make his pupils bilingual, fluent in standard English and the Devonshire dialect. His writings had two aims, to promote the Devonshire dialect and to instruct his readers in the affairs of the outside world. It was indeed the decade of teaching.

His writings for this period have been generally inaccessible, stored in archives of libraries, such as The British Library, until they became available from the British Newspaper Archive. Several of his most popular stories were reprinted in the first three books. These three earliest books were not easily obtained in later years. Heavily revised versions—both in content and language—were reprinted in 1915, in the Devonshire Book, the Third Edition of the Demshure Buke. In the later reuse, e.g. In Chimley Corner (1927), this version of the stories was used as a basis for the re-writings. Any reference to "the Club" was omitted. The audience was no longer Devonshire speaking people, though even in 1933 he hoped it might "gladden the heart of here and there a West-Country exile far from home." "I plead guilty to having made the story ... the first consideration."

Coles support for the Unionist cause never wavered, although it caused much opposition in this period. He used his writing in this period to advocate for such policies as the Boer War, anti-Irish Home Rule, to suggest how to get the Devon people to vote for conservative parties and to attack the Liberal Party and its supporters. As one might expect, he shared the racism of the times. One "progressive" view he espoused was the rights of women. He firmly supported extending the franchise to women, and in the contributions attributed to "Anne Stewer", the disadvantages and aspirations of women were clearly expressed—so clearly that the hand of Florence Coles has been suspected. This was firmly abandoned along with "Uncle Tom Cobleigh's Club", which totally vanished from public consciousness. The retrospectives at the 40th and 50th anniversaries of his writing, and Cock, recognise that from March 1902 until November 1905 his contributions were entitled "The Talk at Uncle Tom Cobleigh's Club" (Cock misspells it as "Cobley"), but no-one knew what that Club was.

Cock says: "He was wise enough to keep political affinities out of his tales, only once did he slip up." (. No reference is given for this "one" occasion. But it was a re-use of an earlier story. The language used against the token "liberal" ["Arry "Awk] was, in the period of the Second Boer War, much more negative. "Zumbody putt "P.B." arter 'Arry 'Awk's naame, an' that wiz vir "pro-Boer." 'Arry didden like et tarl; but tis as Turney zaith, "eef yu goes een tha sty, yu mis' axpeck ta smull o' tha pigs; an' tes tha zort o' smull that'll 'ang about a'body vir a braave while is pigs; an' zo ull pro-Boers vind; thay'll kape tha smull o't vir a gude while ta kom, an' thur's meny English voke wid prefer tha smull o' pigs be a braave zite, an' thik idden tha swatest een tha wurdle."

On the "Irish Question", he (as "Tom Cobleigh") says of an Irish member of parliament," Thee gurt maze-crack, mump-aided vule toad, wat ta gudeness du ’e think thee be zticked up their vor, like a gurt gap-mouthe, lukin’ za zuent as a basket o’ chips, way yer wit-pot nonsince an’ yer ole gites an’ itums, tullin’ o’ zummat thee cassan understan theezul na nobody else nuther. Git 'ome thee wit-pot an’ bide een ouze long o’ misses. Yu mid du a bit o’ gude thur maybe. Yu cude du up a vew choors I dersay, or quiet tha cheel whane ees scralin’, or zee tha tetties didden bile auver an’ zet up a stooer, but er muzzen trist ’e way cloam, or twid be zune brawked aul abroad ta shords.". Cock did not know the early editions of The Demshur Buke, and only two out of some 360 stories of the 1900–1905 series. We do not know what Coles actually wrote in the early stories in the Western Weekly Times, but this kind of language does not occur in the third edition of "Jan Stewer's Demshur Buke" (called "Jan Stewer's Devonshire Book " in the 1915 third edition.) What is true, is that his partisan political views were not published in the printed books, and—we do not know—may not have figured in newspaper stories after 1905. He continued to support the Unionist cause as A. J. (or, Bert) Coles.

=== Teaching ===
==== Autumn 1898 to Spring 1902: Residence School Cottage, Puddington. ====
Coles was appointed in 1898 as Head teacher to the school in Puddington, Devon. Eileen Voce says that he was not in fact so qualified. She cites "the daughter of the Rector of Puddington, the Reverend T. G. Menhinick" as intending to "tutor him himself". He took up duties on 7 March, but because of a snowstorm attendance began He obtained his certificate by December 1898, and the government grant was increased by £9, which was for his salary. The attendance was 30 pupils. Voce calls it "very poor attendance", though it was for a village population of 170. The school was a one-room (albeit a large room) schoolhouse where all the children were taught regardless of age. By June the roll was 40 pupils with an average of 37 for the week. On 30 May 1899 the roll had 50 names, all of whom were in attendance. Coles lived across the street.

The inspector's reports were complimentary and the inspector's report in July 1901 says "This is an excellent specimen of a country school The children are very regular in attendance, keenly interested in their work and making very good progress in all subjects. The teaching is energetic and intelligent and the discipline excellent. Premises and apparatus have been much improved." Coles had the usual difficulties of one teacher teaching 7 grades of classes. He found teaching arithmetic at seven levels particularly difficult

In view of later years it is not surprising that Coles had the children performing in plays! Cock says that "even in those early days, he organised amateur entertainments.". At the end of the first year—1898—the children gave an entertainment, with the admission money being used to give prizes for good attendance. On 23 December the school went carol singing: "The Carols were sung in four parts and solos were sung.". In October 1899, the Cantata "Brittania Queen of Ocean" was performed—with students playing "Brittania, Scotia, Erin, Wales, India, Australia, Canada and South Africa," and a chorus of six boys as "blue jackets" performing a cutlass drill.

He married Florence Stephens on 7 January 1901 in Exton. Her parents (Coles' uncle on his mother's side and his wife) had a farm in Exton Parish, Devon, and Florence was the eldest of seven children. He had wanted to get married on the first of January, 1900 but she did not agree and he had to wait for a year before they married.

As a foretaste of his own entertainments, "[W]hile Mr. Coles was village schoolmaster at Puddington ... he made his famous one-string fiddle from an old cigar box."

==== The School Bell ====
He also wrote and with student assistance duplicated, a monthly magazine. Four copies survived in the possession of his daughter, Mary. The first one was duplicated, and published on 12 February 1899. "The little journal consists of 20 pages, note-size, covered with brown paper. I did the printing with an Eliams duplicator, and the elder children did the binding. About 50 copies [eventually 100] of no. 1 have been sold, thus covering the cost of printing, materials, etc.". The profits went into the Harmonium fund—a fund with the aim of buying an instrument. This combination of careful funding plus generosity in disbursing the monies was typical.

The last page was entitled "The Philosophy of Uncle Ned", and the contents were written in the Devon dialect. This reflects his desired to use the dialect as a teaching aid. This continued with his stories in the Devon and Exeter Gazette. His contributions, entitled "The Talk at Uncle Tom Cobleigh's Club", could have been called "The Philosophy of Uncle Tom", for the earlier ones give Uncle Tom Cobleigh's views on the state of the villages, the plight of farming, the rightness of the (Second) Boer War, the essential nature of the British Empire—no home rule for Ireland--, the intellectual inferiority of the Liberal Party and how to get the villagers to vote conservative.

The biographer—Cock—affirms that the editor of the Devon and Exeter Gazette—Mr G. Gratwicke—saw the pages in the school journal, but wrote a letter just inviting Coles to submit "a" full length story. Cock, the reporter of "Jan Stewer's Jubilee" article and John Beaven in an interview, say that Coles submitted the story with trepidation. Coles is the source of all three accounts. Voce speaks of the editor of the Devon and Somerset Gazette-- "which printed a large portion of the reading matter"-- as having sent congratulations and asked for 'similar story"--to the one on the last page of the school paper. This adds another complication to the story of his start to writing as "Jan Stewer".

Cock speaks of this "first" story as a "one-off". Cock did not access the actual first story, only the second, published a week later!. "One day", (Cock says), Coles was asked to write another story, he "did so at irregular intervals"; "some time later" he was asked for a weekly feature. This is not what Coles said at the time. It _began_ as the series, The Talk at Uncle Tom Cobleigh's Club. A. J. Coles, speaking as Jan Stewer says: "I thot tew mesel' I 'ud jis' drap in wance a wik and tell 'ee what we be dewin’ out ’long thikee part t' country." (I thought to myself I would just drop in once a week and tell you what we are doing out in this part of the country).

And that he did, _every_ Friday (except Good Fridays) from 2 March 1900 until 10 November 1905. His first story was published on 2 March 1900, and, Cock reports, added 7 shillings and 6 pence to his income that week.

The Stewer family in this period differed from that in the later stories. Because we do not have the stories from June 1900 until January 1902 we do not know when the change occurred. "I've a-bin morried twice and ad vive daughters growed up and morried thursel's: 'thout 'tees Susan who bide 'oam tew 'elp 'bout 'ouze." "Susan" becomes "Jane" in all stories after 1902. We see the convention of one daughter remaining unmarried to help her parents.

==== Spring 1902 to Autumn 1902. Residence: 8 Bitton Crescent, Teignmouth ====
Coles was invited to take the position of Head Master at the Exeter Boys School in Teignmouth because the headmaster had died, and the Assistant Master (Mr Dominy) was not yet qualified, although he had conducted the school well during the illness of the previous master (Mr. Skinner). The school had 300 pupils. Coles took this position in 1902 and was very successful there, and the Teignmouth School board complimented him and resolved to give him a good testimonial. They were sorry to lose him, but Mr Dominy had passed his examination, and it was "only in fairness to Mr Dominy that he should receive the appointment."

While at Teignmouth he trained "9 boys and 7 girls" in an operetta, "Mr Nobody", for just a week, and they performed it "very creditably" at the Teignmouth School of Art Fete–—28 August 1902. This was a forerunner of later direction of school pupils. We do not know whether this was a known operetta, or one he wrote, as he did later.

==== Demshur Buke ====
In 1902 the first edition of "Jan Stewer's Demshure Buke" was published. It was "Revised and Adapted for private or public Reading and Reciting." It quickly became very popular—though "Jan" complained that many people expected to get it free. Entertainers used it frequently, although in contrast to later books the publishers required them to get explicit permission for use, under threat of action. An example can be found on 3 January 1903, when at a concert in Combe Martin there was a "humorous recitation, 'The Hot- Water Bottle,' [by] Mr. Brown;" ["Jan’s Adventure with the Hot Water Bottle", page 1 of the Demshure Buke] and the "humorous recitation, How Jan bought his 'bacca," Mr. Brown; ["How Jan got his 'Baccy'", page 17]. "The recitations are given by permission of Mr. H. Dalgeish, South-street, Exeter."

==== 1903–1906: School House, Poltimore. ====
After a year there Coles and his wife moved back to a small village, Poltimore near Exeter, as headmaster. "I have a small village school of under 80 scholars ...A. J. COLES, School House, Poltimore, Sept. 27th." The Diocesan Inspector gave him a good report—the senior students knowledge of the Prayer-book was particularly commended.

Coles again organised a performance by his students. This consisted of an operetta, "Choosing a Knight", which he had written. As well, he and F. Bissett played comical parts, and sang a song "Purple-Pills for Pippy People." F. Bissett was a member of the Chess Club of which Coles was the secretary.

Coles also an organised a "minstrel" group. The Poltimore performance was given "in connexion with the Chess Club". "Reg Wreford" was a member of the band. The name of this group, the "farce", the jokes and the songs, would not be acceptable today because of the racist content.

There their first child, Harry Albert Thomas Coles, was born on 1 February 1903. Colin Stephen was also born while they lived at Poltimore, on 7 September 1904. His two daughters, Mary Adeline Jenny Coles, 16 August 1907 and Joan St Ewer (= Jan Stewer + an o) Coles, 28 December 1910 were born while the family was living in Newton Abbot (see below). By the time the girls were born Coles' alter-ego Jan Stewer had been appearing in stories for first the Devon and Exeter Gazette and then the Western Weekly News and was well known in the Devon area. So while the boys' names can be traced to their father's family, the girls' names managed to include both his own initials and the mythical St Ewer, Coles' wordplay on Stewer.

In Poltimore Coles met "another reciter of stories in the Devon dialect, Charles Wreford" with whom he went on to perform on radio, telling stories in the Devon dialect. (One of the children at the school was Laurence Wreford.) At the time he was also noticed due to the fact he owned one of the first motor-bicycles in the village, which he used to transport both himself and his wife and child around the surrounding area. This interest in machinery was evident in later years as well, but was denied to "Jan Stewer."

While he was there, activities to support the Conservatives and Unionists were held in the schoolroom.

==== 1906–1908: 38 Abbotsbury Road, Newton Abbot. ====
We have more evidence of his involvement in Unionist politics. On 14 August 1903 there was a "numerously attended meeting of the Conservatives and Unionists in the Parish of Poltimore was held in the school room, Poltimore" He was "among those present"). On 5 November 1906 he was one of those participating in a programme of songs at a "Smoking Concert" for the Mid Devon Constitutional Club. On 18 July 1905 he showed his loyalty to the Crown by having the school children line up on both sides of the road, carrying bouquets for "The Princess Frederica of Hanover"—not strictly a princess. A school girl, Esther Miles, presented her with a "charming bouquet"—paid for by the children.

==== A. J. Coles—Bert Coles—Jan Stewer ====
In the period before WWI, A. J. Coles went by three names. These represented three aspects of his public persona. For much of this time, it was not known that these represented the same person. As a generalisation, we can say:-

As a schoolteacher, member or member of the committee of various clubs—the Constitutional Club, and other political groups, the Poltimore Chess Club, the Teignmouth Literary Club, in official documents (e.g. census records), he was usually (Mr.) A. J. Coles.

As entertainer, with a repertoire of songs, violin solos (on his one-string violin constructed from a cigar box), story telling, conjuring and ventriloquism with "Old Peter", his wooden dummy, he was (Mr.) Bert Coles. As he was, especially between 1908 and 1915, also as playwright, entrepreneur and actor. Only occasionally after 1920, when more often he was A. J. Coles. As entertainer before 1908, after which he needed payment, he used his skills and talents as an amateur. He supported entertainments at Unionist meetings, at fund raising concerts for the Party, and especially to support Morrison_Bell's candidature. He was also prominent in supporting charities. He first appeared—anonymously—as "Jan Stewer" at the concert in 1902 for "The Journalists' Orphan Fund". He would appear in concerts for churches—including appeals to repair bells--, for cadet clubs, "to almost every conceivable good cause from painting the parish pump to procuring new uniforms for the town band". Even when he depended on his acting for his livelihood, his generosity was often taken advantage of

As the writer of "yarns" in the newspapers, and collections of these, addressee of letters from expatriate Devonians scattered widely, he was Jan Stewer.

At "smokers" of the Constitutional Club (especially of Newton Abbot) he was member as A. J. Coles, but as a performer, he was Bert Coles. In May 1908 at the Newton Abbot Constitutional Club "Mr. A. J. Coles" was in the chair, but "Mr. Bert Coles created considerable amusement in his humorous recitation." In 1906 the identity of "Jan Stewer" was not common knowledge, certainly not until about 1908. Many people were reciting the "Jan Stewer" stories—encouraged by the publishers—so when Bert Coles read a story by Jan, this was not a give-away. Indeed, when Bert Coles was entertaining with conjuring or ventriloquism, someone else might be reciting a story by "Jan Stewer"! On 2 April 1906, at the Devon Exhibition in Exeter, "in the evening Mr. Bert Coles, of Poltimore, recited 'Jan Stewer's' well known 'Census paper' story with great success' ... In many quarters interest has been aroused as to the identity of the writer.".

When the identity became known, allusions to Coles varied according to the acquaintance of the reader/hearers. We might have "Bert Coles (Jan Stewer)", or "Jan Stewer (Bert Coles—or A. J. Coles)", or "Mr. A. J. Coles, widely known as Jan Stewer." He does not seem to have dressed up as Jan Stewer after the concert in 1902—before 1920—even when telling Jan Stewer stories.

==== Last teaching post: 1906–1908 ====
His last appointment as a teacher was at Bovey Tracey, Devon, at The British School. He had sold his motor-bicycle by then and cycled six miles each way from Newton Abbot, Devon where the family was living at the time. He resigned "in a fit of temper" from the British School, before May 1908. When Morrison-Bell unexpectedly won the 17 January by-election 1908 Ashburton by-election, "a crowd of over 10,000 people gathered in the town centre to hear the result, and after it was announced, several fights broke out. A crowd later invaded the Conservative Club, causing considerable damage." Coles had campaigned extensively for Morrison-Webb and in November, when a Unionist van visited Newton Abbot, Coles chaired an open-air meeting, there was a "storm of opposition" and the lecturer was told "he was telling rotten lies".

It was not only politics. He differed on religion. Many Devon people were "Methody", see Methodism, Chapel, or Nonconformist. Coles was loyal to the Church of England. In 1909 A meeting in Newton Abbot of the Rural Labourer's League was chaired by "Mr. Bert Coles". "[W]hen the Chairman called for three cheers for Capt. Morrison Bell it was received with boohing and hooting.". Previously, in 1908, he had written a story The "RIGHT OF ENTRY" opposing the education act which allowed parents to have a form of religious education taught in the school by people of their own denomination. The story is striking because the people who speak "Standard English"—the Vicar (of the Church of England) and the schoolmaster, are defended, the Devonshire speaking working class—including "William Hodge: (farm labourer and local preacher, Independent Band of the Elect)--are noisy, illmannered and ignorant. "(At this moment the vicar of the parish enters the yard. Instant outburst of snarls, growls, hisses, and evil invocations. ... Angry howls, and cries of "Nivver no more. They days be gone by. Popery, bigamy." &c.) Coles contended it would create friction between people of different denomination, and that no teacher supported it. He makes a reductio ad absurdum of it--"Time 8:50 a.m —Seven and forty parents, and a miscellaneous gathering of ministers, deacons, local preachers, &c., crowd outside the door." He thought that instead of the education act, "it was quite time they brought in a Women’s Suffrage Bill"

He never taught again.

=== Uncle Tom Cobleigh's Club ===
Coles used the narrative device of the minutes of a club to frame his contributions to the Devon and Exeter Gazette from 1902 until 1905. The founder, chairman and authority in the club was "Uncle Tom Cobleigh". While he said that Edward (Ned) Knowles was "the inspiration of my character Jan Stewer if anyone was.", he never said on whom Tom Cobleigh was based. Yet in the contributions in this period Tom Cobleigh was the central character. He was the Samuel Johnson to Jan Stewer's James Boswell. Johnson's Club was the exemplar of the clubs which met for discussion and debate as well as socialisation. The fictional ancestor of Coles's club is The Posthumous Papers of the Pickwick Club by Charles Dickens. The contributions in the Gazette were in the form of "ladders" [letter], purporting to be extracts from the "minits" [minutes] of meeting of the club. "An' I be Jan Stewer. I never 'as naught ta say t' meetin's because I kickees in me speech, but I writes what we ca's the minits —though they takes ’ours to write a' times".

Albert Coles's contributions were in the form of letters to the editor. When Devonians from all over the Empire wrote their letters, they wrote them to "Jan Stewer", and they too wrote in dialect. The club was then somewhat exclusive, it was for dialect speaking Devonians. In abandoning this format, Coles also ceased to have this audience frontally in mind. That Coles wrote under a pseudonym was perfectly normal. His correspondents did too—though he had to make it clear that the paper need a real name and address along with the pseudonym. Coles thus joined a long list of authors who began—and often continued—their writing career writing, at first in newspapers, under a pseudonym. We may think of Charles Dickens ("Boz"), Hector Hugh Munro ("Saki"; Samuel Langhorne Clemens (Mark Twain).

The series began with just the title, The Talk at Uncle Tom Cobleigh's Club, but soon each "letter" gained a subtitle. The first letter introduced the village, "Muddlecombe" (or, "Muddlecombe-in-the-Moor", which was always acknowledged to be based on Puddington. He gives it 300 or 400 inhabitants, though Puddington at the time had about 170. He introduces Uncle Tom, "you never knew Uncle Tom Cobleigh, I think? But you have certainly heard of him," (from the song, "Widecombe Fair". The original dialect is given in the footnote.) Tom Cobleigh says forthrightly that "we are narrow-minded", 'We" do not know that there is another world outside this one, where folk be learning, and inventing, and doing and seeing and hearing...while at the same time we are snoozing and dozing here seeing nothing, hearing nothing, and doing nothing, except what our grandfathers and great-grandfathers did before us.'

This was rank heresy to the nostalgic view that Coles promulgated in later writings. The backward looking views of his villagers became material for humour, the efforts of the Club are seen to be doomed to failure. It is no wonder that after 1905 he never spoke of the club, never referred to ideas found in the "letters", and only used the characters again in retelling the stories from the time, which he could not omit, because they were among the most popular of all his stories. The club? Never.

The club was very important to the readers of the newspaper. Devon-speaking readers constantly wrote—in dialect—to "Jan" from many countries where they had immigrated or were posted. Soldiers during the Second Boer War were very faithful readers and writers.

"I be always vury glad tu git tha paper every wik tu raid wot tha talk at the Club is. Bes' respecks you am Ann.Yours vaithfullv, DEVONIAN."

"Wishing the Club and its members every success, Yours truly.ONE INTERESTED."

"As you can see, I be always vury glad tu git tha paper every wik tu raid wot tha talk at the Club is. Bes' respecks you a' Ann."

"Cawnpore, India, 6th April, 1905. Dear Mr. Stewer,--l I thot I mite as well drap tha a vew lines these wik, as I knaw yu are mortal plazed ta yur frim varreign parts. I rades the "Gazette" ivery wik."

No-one has accessed the paper from June 1900 until January 1902. The British Library has not microfilmed those copies, so the British Newspaper Archive has not posted them online. Which is a pity, as we do not know when humorous stories about "Jan" and other villagers replaced political and literary offerings (e.g. poems). Humour became much more important.

=== End of the Uncle Tom Cobleigh Club ===
In November 1905 Coles walks away from the Devon and Exeter Daily Gazette with no unambiguous warning. He had been writing for the (Illustrated) Western Weekly News for some six months, overlapping with the Gazette. There is no internet access to the Weekly Western News, if any copies still exist; so we do not know if there was any comment there. The last article in the Gazette is attributed to "Ann Stewer", though there is a postscript "ANSWERS TO CORRESPONDENTS" presumably from "Jan Stewer".

In this "she"says:

"[B]ut I shan' 'ave my name drayed een vir a laffin spoart, now I tells 'e, wance vir all, an' if 'e dus it agean I'll burn ev'ry pen us got 'bout the plaace an' emp the ink into the pegs' bucket. So now vu'm warned, an' yu kin tull'n wat I zes."

He had no chance to "do it again." On 17th "Uncle Tom" writes:

"THE TALK AT UNCLE TOM COBLEIGH'S CLUB. H'VE 'EE ZEED JAN?

Muddlecombe-in-the-Moor. November 16th, 1905.

Deer Zur,—H've 'ee zeed Jan? Laast wik Missus Stewer zend 'ee a ladder tullin ow her'd zarve 'en if 'e made 'er a gape snach bout thick pehanner. Wull, us haint zeed Jan sunce. Zum du say her must a popped en in wan o' thay grammyphones and blawed en tu Jerriko, or else th' poor blid ha' trapsied off to Lunnon an' lost hisself.

Ennyhow postman du zay he han't had no ladder theas wik from 'en for 'ee. Wunner if telled 'ee, zo us ave a telled 'ee. Wunner if us can tell 'ee up zum ole witpot. "

Subsequently, the name was changed to "The Talk Of Uncle Tom Cobleigh" and is signed "Uncle Tom Cobleigh". Some of the subsequent stories were collected in two volumes. Devon libraries suggests that the author might have been "[i.e. Edward Robert Gotto?]." This was the end of the Club that had figured so largely in the stories, and was so often mentioned in the letters (written in dialect) from Devonians living in many countries. Whether or not the correspondents to Jan Stewer continued in dialect we do not know. The context of the new stories, "The Devonshire Carrier's Van" continued for another 60 years—even though it became a motor bus. But no more club. Uncle Tom Cobleigh is demoted, his name becomes Tom Cobley (as usual in the song) even in the third (1915) edition of Jan Stewer's Devonshire Book. Mystery.

== New Career path ==
1908–1913; 38 Abbotsbury Road, Newton Abbot.

=== Revel Day ===
In October 1907, Coles offered to write a "musical comedy, introducing 'Songs of the West'" for the Newton Abbot Choral Society. The suggestion to produce it "after Christmas" was referred to the Committee. It was to be produced in the Alexandra Hall "in order to reduce the debt." The path there was indirect.

Coles had already produced a play he had written, "Choosing a Knight", with the young students of the British schools—in the Bovey Tracey Town Hall—and in which he and F. Bissett acted. He promised the students of the "night school" (The Evening Continuation Class) that if they stayed around he would produce a play for them. (Cock says—from Coles or his children—that it was practised in an extra class. After five months of rehearsal "Revel Day" was presented in the Bovey Tracey Town Hall on 19 and 20 May 1908 [not 1907]. Although "written for presentation in a much larger building" it was a great success. It was repeated two weeks later, on 2 June, in the Alexandra Hall, Newton Abbot, with the same cast. Rev. S. Baring-Gould, from whose volume "SONGS OF THE WEST" the songs were taken, was present on the opening night of both occasions, and spoke of how he had collected the folk songs. The number of the cast is variously given as between 30 and 40. In one review 32 are mentioned by name, plus 5 in the orchestra and the "[i]ncidental music was given Mr. W. Back, L.R.A.M., who conducted. The core of the cast of the operetta was a number of friends and acquaintances of "Bert" Coles. H. W. Hawker had performed with Bert Coles in the Bovey Tracey Constitutional Club, and "Mr W Hawker, an old favourite with local audiences, [he] made a fine old English gentleman, his jovial style and rollicking manner suiting the hunting squire well." The "ploughboys, milkmaids, and villagers" who formed the chorus, performed the dances, were indeed "amateurs".

A fortnight later, it was performed in Newton Abbot, with the same cast, and Rev. Baring-Gould again addressed the audience. "Prices—Reserved and numbered, 3s-: Family Tickets Four* 10s 6d-: Reserved, 2s-: Family Tickets of Four. 7s. Unreserved, 1s- ". "After the expenses the performances of Mr. Bert Coles' operetta, Revel Day, at Bovey Tracey and Newton Abbot had been met. and the members the company had an outing, the balance of about £6 was given to Newton Abbot Hospital". The play was published as Revel Day. A Devonshire play by Bert Coles by the Mid-Devon News, NDA.

Coles kept the company together. It was known both as "The Revel Day Company" and "jan Stewer Amateur Operatic Society,"—anonymity over. As well as full performances, they gave performances of extracts for charities. The exact sequence of performances is not quite clear. One version says "In 1910 it provided evening entertainment for the Devon County Show at Newton Abbot.... The proprietor of Torquay's Theatre Royal saw the performance and invited them ... for a week at his theatre. After this it played for a week in Exeter, and then went back to Torquay again.".

It was in the Alexandra Theatre, Newton Abbot in 1908. The Devon County Show was in Newton Abbot in 1911-the coronation year. The venue was the Butter Market, on Tuesday 16 and Wednesday 17 May 1911. It was performed for 5 days, 21–26 June 1911 in the Torquay Theatre. On the 22nd the coronation George V was celebrated by playing the National Anthem. "The proceeds are to be devoted to the formation and equipping the Newton Abbot Cadet Corps, of which Mr Bert Coles is one of the officers." The show went to the Exeter Theatre for a week, last afternoon and evening on 15 July 1911, also to benefit the 5th Devon Cadet Corps, after expenses

In 1922 the operetta was performed in Torquay again, and £5 was donated from the proceeds for the "Christmas Pudding Fund" at The Western Morning News.

The success of this venture was a foretaste of his success as writing, acting and producing plays—especially in the 30s. It was later (1922) shown with a revised script and new orchestration (by Jack Furler this time) at Torquay Pavilion.

Cock says that "not until twenty years after his first tentative performance at Exeter could he pluck up courage to perform in that city again." This can only mean, dressed up and performing as the character "Jan Stewer", for he performed in Exeter in "Revel Day" (1911), and in 1913 he appeared in the Exeter Theatre with a company of amateurs, singing songs, relating his stories, and acting in a recently written ("completed within a week") one-act play, "Two wrongs, one right." The reviewer considered it possible that he would go to the music halls.

He did however, need a "day job". In the 1911 census he gave his occupation as "Managing director Newspaper Company". Cock says he was managing editor of the Mid Devon Advertiser and the Torbay News 1909 to 1913. In 1907, while at the British School, he had judged a children's writing competition for the East and South Devon Advertiser. In this newspaper, the reviews of 1908 performances of "Revel Day" were particularly fulsome. In October 1908 a company was formed to buy this newspaper. Albert John Coles was the company representative in the negotiations, which were finalised on 25 December 1908. It was then "Printed and Published by ALBERT JOHN COLES, for the MID-DEVON NEWSPAPER C0.". The paper then became The Mid-Devon Advertiser, Coles apparently continuing in his position.

1913–1926.: St. Ewer, Cricketfield Rd., Torquay.

In 1913 and 1914 Coles was busy giving entertainments/concerts around the region. He was trying to enlist, but age was against him, though his elder brother, who had joined "D" Company—the "Buffs" in 1900, and served in the Boer War, was already serving overseas. He gave concerts in aid of people affected by the war—e.g. at Folkestone, Kent. where he had been educated, in aid of the Belgian Refugees' fund and the Mayor's War Relief Fund. Because of his experience in the Royal Artillery he finally was allowed to enlist. He had health problems and never reached France as he hoped. His work in Egypt seems to have been rather a desk job, but he got experiences he used for "Jan Stewer" stories in the Western Weekly News. In 1920 some were reprinted in Jan Stewer at Home and Abroad.

Date: 1914-1920; Corps: Royal Garrison Artillery; Regiment No:281941; Rank: Acting Serjeant, then, Second Lieutenant;

Royal Garrison Artillery

The family remained in Torquay.

=== Jan Stewer, writer and performer ===
He returned in November 1919. In 1920 he published advertisements like this:

ENGAGEMENTS ACCEPTED FOR JAN STEWER

THE CELEBRATED DEVON DIALECT HUMORIST

("Illustrated Western Weekly News")

AND ENTERTAINER,

FOR "AT HOMES" AND ALL FUNCTIONS.

Write A. J. COLES,

St. Ewer, Torquay.

== Home and Abroad ==
His book, Jan Stewer at Home and Abroad was published in 1920. It contained some stories from Coles's time in Egypt during WWWI, plus some about "Jan Stewer's" adventures in London. These latter are distinctly rustic, even yokel—Jan's confusions with an escalator, automatic doors, the London underground. The Egypt stories read more like a normal tourist: "But laur' bless 'ee, 'tis when you gets up handy to the ole veller that you zees what a tremenyus size he be." Every tourist's reaction. And Coles must have relished the flight in an aeroplane.

An appendage to the book in the Western Morning News edition, not repeated in subsequent editions, is the text of a play, "In the Higher Sphere: A Devonshire Drama*." The story began as a four part in the "(Illustrated) Western Weekly News", December 1906. This is not consultable, but it was reprinted as "Reuben Ley in the Higher Circle", in the second series of In a Devonshire Carrier's Van (1908). "[N]ot reprinted in the hardback editions, [it] is an example of the countryman's sense of unease when one of his children marries into another class." It also depicts the newly rich man's wife as being a social climber.

The story was adapted to a sketch in which the family, apart from Florence, performed. (For example, at Barnstaple on the "annual visit".)

He travelled constantly for these engagements. In November and December 1920 he made "a tour of the principal towns and villages in Cornwall and West Devon."

Cock describes the content of his performances. "The compere of each show was A. J. Coles, in boiled shirt and tails". He would play on his one-string guitar, give a ventriloquist dialogue with "Ole Peter", and a "mentalist" act—remembering thirty objects in order. He would then act as "Jan Stewer", changing into costume.

In the early nineteen-twenties Coles was assisted by Dorothy Latham who not only "accompanied Jan on the piano" but sang her own songs and contributed to the performance until the family were old enough to form a party. In 1924 "he presented one with the assistance Miss Gladys Latham, entitled 'A Scratch Rehearsal.' This gave ample scope for the abilities of Mr. Cole[sic!] and his assistant, and their singing and acting was wonderfully good. In this sketch appeared Peter, the wonderful doll." In some of the reviews of the concerts Dorothy Latham was seen as a performer in her own right, not merely an assistant. Cock is mistaken to say "To begin with, Coles held the stage alone.". Without his family, but not alone.

In an identification of the fictional Jan Stewer with Coles, in chapter I of Ole Biskit Jan Stewer is no longer portayed as a farmer, but as an entertainer! "[Y]ou'm rinning about so many places, to they ole kickshaws [entertainment, amusement] and penny-raidings [ penny readings; "village entertainments"]." It his travels extensively--"I've been to Bude, that's right up north o' Cornwall, and down to Penzance, that's so-fur as the train will take 'ee, and scores of places in between; and up t'other way I bin to Bristol and Bath and Bournemouth and Swindon and lots o' plaaces around there." The chapter also provides a good description of the itinerant entertainers life: "I was properly zick, weary and tired o' poking about, changing to one station, and changing to another station, and waiting fer the train zometimes for howers on end."

We do not know when he acquired "Ole Biskit." By 1922 at least—in the "Western Weekly News" April 1922 he had a story "What Happened to Old Biskit", in 1925 he took the family party on tour—with Harry on a "'Wolf' motor bike. It is unlikely that five would fit in the car—the photograph Cock gives, taken near Derry's Clock Plymouth, makes it unlikely., but in 1925 the book "'Ole Biskit' speaks of the demise of Jan's car. In 1927, Jan Stewer is quoted as giving one of his testimonials, to a car repairer, "When you fetched back my ole car I hardly knawed'n. I almost thought 'twas a new one. How you do's it I can't think for he was looking shockin bad." "Jan" never bought a new car, but Coles bought a new one in 1930. He gave a rave review ("his unsolicited testimonial") of his new car: "Dear Sirs,--Having driven my new Singer Junior hard for nearly three months, I am glad to able to tell you I am delighted with the performance she is putting up. The advertisement gives photographs of Coles in "Ole Biskit" and in the new car.

But Coles retains his identity. In the 1925 Besley and Copp edition, (but NOT the Herbert Jenkins of 1933) the "Author's Apology" is signed "St. Ewer, Torquay; A.J.COLES (Jan Stewer)".

In 1925 we have the mention of another play: "In aid of the Newton Abbot Hospital Enlargement Fund, Jan Stewer presented his "Happy Family in Wit-Cot," at Alexandra Hall, Newton Abbot, on Wednesday (29 July). This also illustrates the way he continued to give his time and writings to charities, when he might have been earning his own income.

1925—Cock dates it merely "One summer, in their Torquay days"—was the year of the highlight family tour. It was the year that the party included a pierrot act—Cock has a photograph of the three men dressed in costumes, for which Florence was largely responsible. Cock says that the party rented rooms in Barnstaple for the tours, and toured "Woolacombe, Torrington, Westaward Ho!, Croyde Bay and Braunton"—but in July the "North Devon Journal" says he paid his "annual visit", "this time presenting a complete pierrot party".

In 1926 we see him appearing with the "All Star Vaudeville Co.. under the direction of Harry Benet, Ltd."

=== BBC ===
It is in this period that Coles begins his broadcasting. In 1924 he has an extensive programme with his family—and Gladys Latham. Florence has role! Usually, "his wife never appeared on stage, but her work behind the scenes was indispensable".

Jan Stewer of Devon, (humorist), supported by the rest of his family, in Devonshire Dialect Recitals and Folksongs, &c. Vocalist, Gladys Latham. Chorus: "The Mallard" ("Songs of the West") (arr. Baring-Gould and Sheppard). Jan Stewer: A Devonshire Story (A. J. Coles). Gladys Latham (mezzo-soprano): "Ave Maria (Intermezzo, Cavalleria Rusticana") (Mascagni). Jan Stewer: "Our Band" (Mabel Buchanan). Gladys Latham: "Only seven" (Lilian Grey), "Night of stars" ("Tales of Hoffmann") (Offenbach), Jan Stewer and party : Sketch, " The All-Fidgettes Day by the Seaside" (written and produced by A. J. Coles). Father, A. J. Coles; Mother, Mrs. A. J. Coles; Herbert (eldest son), Harry Coles; Maudie (his fiancee), Gladys Latham; Emiline, Mary Coles; Little Willie, Joan Coles; and Jan Stewer, Himself. Scenes: Leaving Home, The Journey, On the Sands. The End of a (More or Less) Perfect Day. Hilda Smart: "Folk-song (Mark Hambourg), "Serenade d'Arlequin " (Schutt), "Evening bells" (V. Billi)

=== Residence: 1927–1931: Poole's Farm, Whitestone ===
This farm he renamed Five-mile farm as it was 5 miles from Exeter. Cock says it was bought for Colin Coles' benefit—but not why. It had "a modern residence, outbuildings and about 31 acres of land." The farm had been auctioned on 18 June 1926, but passed in at £1,400. What Coles paid for it is not known. Nor do we know how many labourers he employed. But it shows he had sufficient assets to purchase a farm freehold, and pay workers. Coles was strongly opposed to the new regulations for safety and hygiene on dairy farms. He satirised them in Rules & Regillations of the New Milk and Dairies Order, according to Jan Stewer [1927].

Coles showed his continuing interest in modern technology, first by having a demonstration of "1 Mole Plough. 2 Excavators. 2 Ditching Elevators. 1 Horse Winch. 1 Portable Engine Winch" (31 March 1927) and in the same year, by hosting a "mechanical drainage demonstration, under the auspices of Devon County Agricultural Committee",

A further project was the ‘Jan Stewer Tay Gardens’ where at least once they all dressed as characters from "Muddlecombe".

=== Barnet's Folly ===
Also while residing on the farm that Coles began his most successful period as playwright and actor. He, now with his family, were performing concerts with different kinds of acts. For example, on 19 June 1928 he performed his story "The Census" as duologue with daughter Joan. But momentously, in 19 June (or so) 1928, at a concert in Whitestone—near the farm—he "assisted by his son [Colin] and two daughters {Mary and Joan], included in the programme a play, entitled 'Barnett's Folly' [which] was much enjoyed." [Note: Barnett not Barnet, as later]. The idea behind the play had a long pedigree. In March 1900 Coles has "Uncle Tom Cobleigh" say that what farmers needed most was co-operation: "the middle an' both ends ov the matter is conglomeration. That means a-stickin' together. We wants a Nash'nal Union o' Varmers, wheerby all the agriculturalers in the country could put all thur voices together, an' maake a big noise as 'ad be yeerd in the land." "Us should 'ave a 'sociation to each distrik all over the country, and get as many varmers as possible to jine.". However, 1928 Coles had abandoned hope of this happening. "It seemed to him inevitable that certain types of people ....., from a distrust of others and selfish regard for themselves would always knock the bottom out of any real attempt at co-operation.". The play "derives its title from an effort made to establish a Farmers' Co-Operative Trading Society." But the play was a success—whether it was the final three act version or a preliminary one act, is not known. It is said that it was based on a story in his Carrier's Van series.

It came to the attention of Bernard Copping: Cock says Coles took the initiative and sent him the script. He produced the play in Plymouth, acted by the Plymouth Repertory Players. The part of George Growsell, which Coles made his own, was here played by Leslie Sanders. One review said that some of the actors found "some difficulty" in mastering the dialect.

"About a year later" Chloe Gibson wrote to Coles offering to produce his play. It was performed by her company in the Torquay Pavilion in June 1932. Jan Stewer played George Growsell, and Chloe Gibson Hannah Mudge.

Cock says that Percy Dunsford, manager of the Exeter Theatre Royal was in the audience one night: resulting in Chloe Gibson's Company playing it in Exeter for the week 24–28 October 1932. There, Cock says, Roy Limbert saw it, and promised to take it to London—after trying it out with the Malvern Company in "a few chosen theatres". His Malvern Company played it in the Pier Pavilion, in the week of 8 June 1933.with Jan Stewer and Chloe Gibson in their roles of Growsell and Mudge. "Jan Stewer" (Coles) was producer as well as acting. The Malvern Company performed it in Brighton on 5 June 1933. Coles again acting and producing.

The Birmingham Repertory performed the play in the Birmingham Repertory Theater. It opened in the first week of January 1934. " Mr. Stewer appears in the part of George Growsell, as he did when the play was produced at Brighton in 1933" The play was also part of their Autumn programme from 9 November). The run was extended until 23 November 1934, but the part of George Growsell was taken over by Charles Victor on 9 November, as Coles had a previous engagement.

Roy Lambert's "Malvern Company" played a revised version of the play in Exeter beginning on May 7, 1934

It was performed in Birmingham on 27 October 1934, (matinee Thursday 1)

The play made it to the Haymarket, London, on 14 February 1935. Coles again played the part of George Growsell. It was a Barry Jackson-Roy Limbert production. Cock says it ran "about a hundred performances".

It was very popular with amateur groups. In 1937, for example, it was performed Selly Oak Yong[sic] Peoples' Adult School at the Middlemore Homes Selly Oak, Birmingham. The play was also performed by Thorverton Amateur Dramatic Society in 1955 with Jan Stewer playing the part of George Growsell.

=== Agatha's Heaven ===
Chloe Gibson presented "A. J. Coles (Jan Stewer)"'s "Agatha's Heaven" in Torquay on 15 May 1933. Both "Jan Stewer" and Joan Coles acted in it. Chloe Gibson played Agatha Cunningham.

Coinciding with the first night of "Barnet's Folly" in London, the Barnfield Players presented "Agatha's Heaven" in the Barnfield Hall. It was produced by Colin Coles, and Mary Coles played Agatha Cunningham. The review said she was "a little colourless in tone".

== A J Coles becomes Jan Stewer ==
In 1964 we hear: "It is one of my proudest boasts that I am Jan to pretty nearly every man, wumman, and chile in the county," the author laughed.

1931–1934: not known where they lived.

1934--"the middle of the war" Probably after 1942: Grendon Private Hotel, Exeter.

Coles acquired this hotel, and apparently his daughter ran it. In the 1939 (War time) census Joan St Ewer Coles gave her occupation as "Hotel Manageress".

It was here that Coles formed the Grendon Players who performed many of his new plays. On 18 October 1937 they performed Coles's "The Cat and Pigeons" in the Pavilion, Torquay. The cast list identifies the members of the Grendon Players—Joan St. Ewer [Coles]; Margaret Dyson; Rosemary Mortimore; Harry Coles; William Martin; Ethel Greenaway; Norman Hoyte; Peggie Mathews; Percival Sebley; Clifford Mortimore; Lisotte Almy; John Dimes; Norman Taylor; A. J. Coles Three members of the Coles family—including Harry—were players.

It is in the 30s that he becomes widely known as a playwright, actor and producer. He gave his occupation as "Journalist and Playwright".

It was while living here that his store of "rare old dialect writings and books long out of print, works of reference, thousands of cuttings, diaries, programmes of past events, photographs, letters from readers all over the world, manuscripts, and half written plays, which stretched back forty years", kept in a rented room, were totally destroyed in a May 1942 bombing raid. This made Cock's work much harder, as he had to rely on family memories

1942?–1951: Residence not known.

In 1944 he was touring with the C.E.M.A. as the Lord Mayor of London, in Thomas Dekker's play, "The Shoemaker's Holiday". He "gave away" his daughter Joan St Ewer in marriage to Edwin William Lilley. Both bride and bridegroom were at this time employed by the Air Ministry.

1951–1965: Caravan in Pathfinder Village, Tedburn St Mary.Avondale - Pathfinder Village (Close to Five Mile Farm).

== Films ==
In the early 1950s Coles, as "Jan Stewer" acted in some local films.

1951. An amateur production, All Along, Down Along.

1954. "Coles provided the commentary for a film about the Bath and West Show."

"Later 1950s". Commentary for a film, "Gateway to Heaven", commissioned by the Devon Education Committee.

== BBC TV ==
More professionally, there were also four BBC TV Dramas. The biographer does not seem to know of them.

1953. The play, "Follow the Plough", by R.F. Delderfield. He played Cagey Narracott.

1955. A play by Eden Phillpotts, "The Farmer's Wife"; directed by Owen Reed. "Jan" played Churdles Ash. (Coles had been a member of the cast which broadcast this play over the BBC on 2 February 1934).

1955. His own play, "Barnet's Folly". In it he played the part he was well known for in the 1930s: George Growsell. (The two characters, Churdles Ash and George Growsell, were often compared by critics. Ash was often considered the superior character.)

1957. The play, "The Orange Orchard", by Eden Phillpotts, directed by Brandon Acton-Bond. "Jan" played Arthur Brimacombe.

== Deaths ==
His wife, Florence, died in 1961. On 18 August 1965, he went for a walk and was hit by a van, and died

== Publications ==
=== Newspaper stories ===
First story in the Devon and Exeter Gazette:

- Stewer, Jan (2 March 1900). "The Talk at Uncle Tom Cobleigh's Club". Devon and Exeter Gazette. Exeter.

A story was published every week until the last story:

- Stewer, Jan (10 November 1905). "The Talk at Uncle Tom Cobleigh's Club: Jan's Piano (continued)". Devon and Exeter Daily Gazette. Exeter.

First story in The (Illustrated) Western Weekly News. It overlaps with above series.

- Stewer, Jan (28 July 1905). "In a Devonshire Carrier's Van: The Man Who Never Told a Lie". Western Weekly News. Plymouth.

A story was published every week, with a few exceptions during WWI, 1914–1918, until the Western Weekly News ceased publication with the issue of 8 October 1939. The series was continued in the Western Times as "Our Westcountry Dialect Story". From 1945 the series was also published in the Devon and Exeter Gazette. First story:

- Stewer, Jan (3 November 1939). "In a Devonshire Carrier's Van: Sort of Introduction". Western Times. Plymouth.

He announced his "retirement" in 1964, though for some years before that he had written fortnightly.

=== Articles and non-series stories ===
- Stewer, Jan (25 November 1908). "THE 'RIGHT OF ENTRY.' (Being a Day in the History of a Rural School in 1910)". Western Morning News. Plymouth.
- Stewer, Jan (Autumn 1949). "The Dreadful Dialect". The West Country Magazine Vol. 4, No. 3. London.

=== Books ===
- Stewer, Jan (1902). Uncle Tom Cobleigh's club at Torquay races. Exeter: Besley and Dalgeish.
- Stewer, Jan (1902). Jan Stewer's Demshur Buke [First Edition]. Exeter: Besley and Dalgeish.
- Stewer, Jan. Jan Stewer's Demshur Buke: Revised and Adapted for private or public Reading and Reciting; second edition. Exeter: Besley and Dalgeish.
- Stewer, Jan (1906). In a Devonshire Carrier's Van: Tales told in the Devon Dialect: Reprinted from "The Illustrated Western Weekly News. Plymouth: The Western Morning News Co., Ltd.
- Stewer, Jan (1908). In a Devonshire Carriers Van. Second Series. Plymouth: The Western Morning News Co., Ltd.
- Coles ["Stewer"], Albert John ["Jan"] (1912). Revel Day. A Devonshire play by Bert Coles. Newton Abbot: Mid-Devon Newspaper Co.
- Stewer, Jan (1914). In a Devonshire Carrier's Van: Third series. Plymouth: Western Morning News Co., Ltd.
- Stewer, Jan (1915). Jan Stewer's Devonshire Book: Revised and Adapted for Private or Public Reading or Reciting, Third Edition, Containing New and Revised Stories. Exeter: Besley and Copp.
- Stewer, Jan (1920). Jan Stewer At Home And Abroad; (including) In the higher Sphere, A Devonshire Drama. Plymouth: The Western Morning News Co., Ltd.
- Stewer, Jan (1923). Out come Mother and me [musical score]. London: J. H. Larway.
- Stewer, Jan (1925). Ole Biskit: and Other Tales in the Devon Dialect; with glossary. Exeter: Besley and Copp.
- Stewer, Jan (1927). In Chimley Corner. London: Herbert Jenkins Limited.
- Stewer, Jan (1927). Rules & Regillations of the New Milk and Dairies Order, according to Jan Stewer. Exeter: Besley & Copp.2nd ed. 1928.
- Stewer, Jan (1930). A Parcel of Ol' Crams. London: Herbert Jenkins.
- Stewer, Jan (1930). When mother and me joined in (musical score). London: J.H. Larway.
- Stewer, Jan. What about a little drop of cider (musical score).
- Stewer, Jan (1931). Yap. London: Herbert Jenkins.
- Stewer, Jan (1932). Barnet's Folly. A comedy in three acts. [With plates.] London: Herbert Jenkins.
- Stewer, Jan (1932). Agatha's Heaven. A comedy in three acts. London: Herbert Jenkins.
- Stewer, Jan (1933). Ole Biskit. London: Herbert Jenkins.
- Stewer, Jan (1935). Barnet's Folly. French's acting edition. London, Toronto: Samuel French.
- Stewer, Jan (1938). Agatha's Heaven. A comedy in three acts,[French's Acting Edition]. London: Samuel French.
- Stewer, Jan (1938). Lias and Betty. London: Herbert Jenkins.
- Stewer, Jan (1949). On the Moor of a Night. London: Westaway Books.
- Stewer, Jan (1952). The Shop with Two Windows. london: Westaway Books.

Some of these stories have been recorded by John Sage.

The following books written by an A. J. Coles, Assistant Master at St Albans School, are cited in several libraries, as noted in WorldCat.org as being by Jan Stewer. But Albert John Coles was not a teacher in St Albans School! This A. J. Coles was never "Jan Stewer."

- Coles, Albert John (1930). Thought in English Prose ... A course for schools (Junior ed.). Exeter: William Heinemann.
- Coles, Albert John (1935). Thought in English prose (intermediate edition); a course for schools. London, Toronto: William Heinemann Ltd.
