= Apparent-time hypothesis =

The apparent-time hypothesis is a methodological construct in sociolinguistics whereby language change is studied by comparing the speech of individuals of different ages. If language change is taking place, the apparent-time hypothesis assumes that older generations will represent an earlier form of the language and that younger generations will represent a later form. Thus, by comparing younger and older speakers, the direction of language change can be detected.

The apparent-time method allows change to be studied by synchronic analysis, which examines the state of the language at a particular point in time. That contrasts with real-time sociolinguistics, which compares data from two points in time to observe change directly.

Apparent-time analysis assumes that most features of language are acquired during childhood and remain relatively unchanged throughout an individual's lifetime once that individual is past a certain age. Therefore, a speaker's speech is a reflection of speech patterns acquired during language learning as a child.

== Overview ==
=== Methodology ===
The apparent-time hypothesis depends on several assumptions: a significantly broad sample is taken to be representative of the population, and vernacular speech is relatively stable in a given individual after adolescence. Apparent-time studies are examples of cross-sectional studies in which a population group is examined at a certain point in time.

Within the population, age-stratified variation is assumed to reflect the ages at which members of the population learned language. It is often contrasted with real-time studies, which are examples of longitudinal studies.

The most direct way of investigating a population's usage of linguistic variants is through surveys and interviews. In the case of apparent-time studies, surveys are conducted in a population across a broad age range to investigate the linguistic variants across a broad age spectrum. Theoretically, patterns of use should differ between different age groups.

Data gathered from real-time sociolinguistics studies can also be used for apparent-time sociolinguistics. However, apparent-time data are only a surrogate for real-time evidence and care must be made before they are considered to represent diachronic linguistic developments.

=== Merits ===
The apparent-time hypothesis allows sociolinguists the convenience of gathering data at one point in time or analyzing past data from historical linguistic studies that cannot be replicated. For real-time sociolinguistics, the same participants of the study must be recruited and tested at later times to validate the data, which is a method that is difficult to implement. However, real-time corpora can also be used for apparent-time analyses.

== Controversies ==
=== Criticisms ===
The use of the apparent-time hypothesis in sociolinguistics is criticized for its insufficient informative value concerning an actual language change in progress. The results, if the study reflects a variation within different age groups, may be read as an ongoing language change or merely an expression of an age-graded variation within the tested network, which can have various reasons and does not necessarily indicate an actual language change.

=== Comparison to real-time sociolinguistics ===
Apparent-time sociolinguistics is often contrasted with real-time sociolinguistics. The apparent-time hypothesis is often assumed when it is not feasible to conduct real-time studies because of reasons such as time constraints and limited data.

==== Montreal English ====
Boberg compares apparent-time data on Montreal English with real-time data from earlier studies of the same community. A comparison was made between the 1972 survey by Scargill and Warkentyne and the more recent study in 1998-99 by Chambers. Real-time comparisons were made between the student group in 1972 to the 14–19 age group in 1999 and the parents from 1972 to the 40–49 age group in 1999. To make direct comparisons, data from 1999 were restricted to the real and project age categories of the 1972 study.

The results reveal that some age-correlated lexical variables show stability over speakers' lifetimes, which would suggest ongoing change, but others show a change in progress over the speakers' lifetimes. However, the nature of individual change is generally found to be not the rejection of new variants by older speakers, as associated with the age-grading model, but the late adoption of new variants by adults who learned older variants as children.

== Case studies ==
=== Canadian (wh) study ===
Canadian linguist J.K. Chambers, conducted a study applying the apparent-time hypothesis. The study, carried out in central Canada, examined the sociolinguistic variable (wh), where the unvoiced labiovelar glide /hw/ loses phonemic status and merges with the corresponding voiced glide /w/. In this study, the oldest subjects seem to indicate a stable period for this variable, both the 70- to 79-year-olds and those over 80 used the voiced variant where the unvoiced was "expected" 38.3 and 37.7% of the time, respectively. Each subsequent younger age cohort (10 years) shows a greater percentage of /w/ usage, with those 20–29 using /w/ 87.6% of the time and the teenagers using it 90.6% of the time. Notice that the deltas between the oldest two groups and between the youngest two groups are relatively small, 0.6% and 3.0%. Between these two extremes the rate of change between the groups is quite high, approximately 10% per age cohort. This pattern can be described as an initial stable period, followed by a period of rapid change, and a tailing off as the change nears completion. This S-curve pattern has been identified as characteristic for many types of linguistic changes.

=== Maison study ===
The apparent-time hypothesis has been applied in studies involving statistical analyses of semantic similarity judgements. J.P. Magué performed a study with native French speakers with mean ages of 21 years and 56 years. The study measured semantic variation among the speakers to create a semantic field by analyzing the speakers' judgements of synonyms for the French word maison 'house'. The synonyms had a high-frequency variation between the first and second halves of the 20th century. A correlation was found between semantic variation and age, in which the older group judged the synonyms more similar than the younger group. This shows that variation in semantic representations reflect semantic change instead of an age-grading phenomenon. This would be confirmed by real-time studies.

The apparent time hypothesis has yet to be verified for semantic studies; however age-grading does not adequately explain why the semantic variation between ages occurs.

=== Martha's Vineyard study ===
Point of interest in the Martha's Vineyard study, conducted by William Labov in 1961, were the linguistic variables (ay) and (aw) in the speech of the islanders. The findings showed that the highest rate of centralization could be seen in the group of middle-age islanders from 31 to 45. Next highest rates were to be seen within the group of 46 to 60 years old. The age-stratified variation of the analyzed variables can be seen as an indicator of language change in progress, showing that the centralization of diphthongs on the island is about to decline in younger age groups. On the other hand, Labov discovered that young inhabitants, who left the island for work or study, showed an increase of centralizing diphthongs after they returned, which was explained by social factors. In fact, the study can rather be seen as a further point of intersection, where the apparent-time hypothesis comes across with the controversy of the hypothesis of age-graded variation, in which "individuals change their linguistic behavior throughout their lifetimes, but the community as a whole does not change.".

== See also ==
- Age-graded variation
- Cross-sectional studies
- Diachronic linguistics (historical linguistics)
- Jack Chambers (linguist)
- Language change
- William Labov
