= 19th-century London =

London-related events during the 19th century

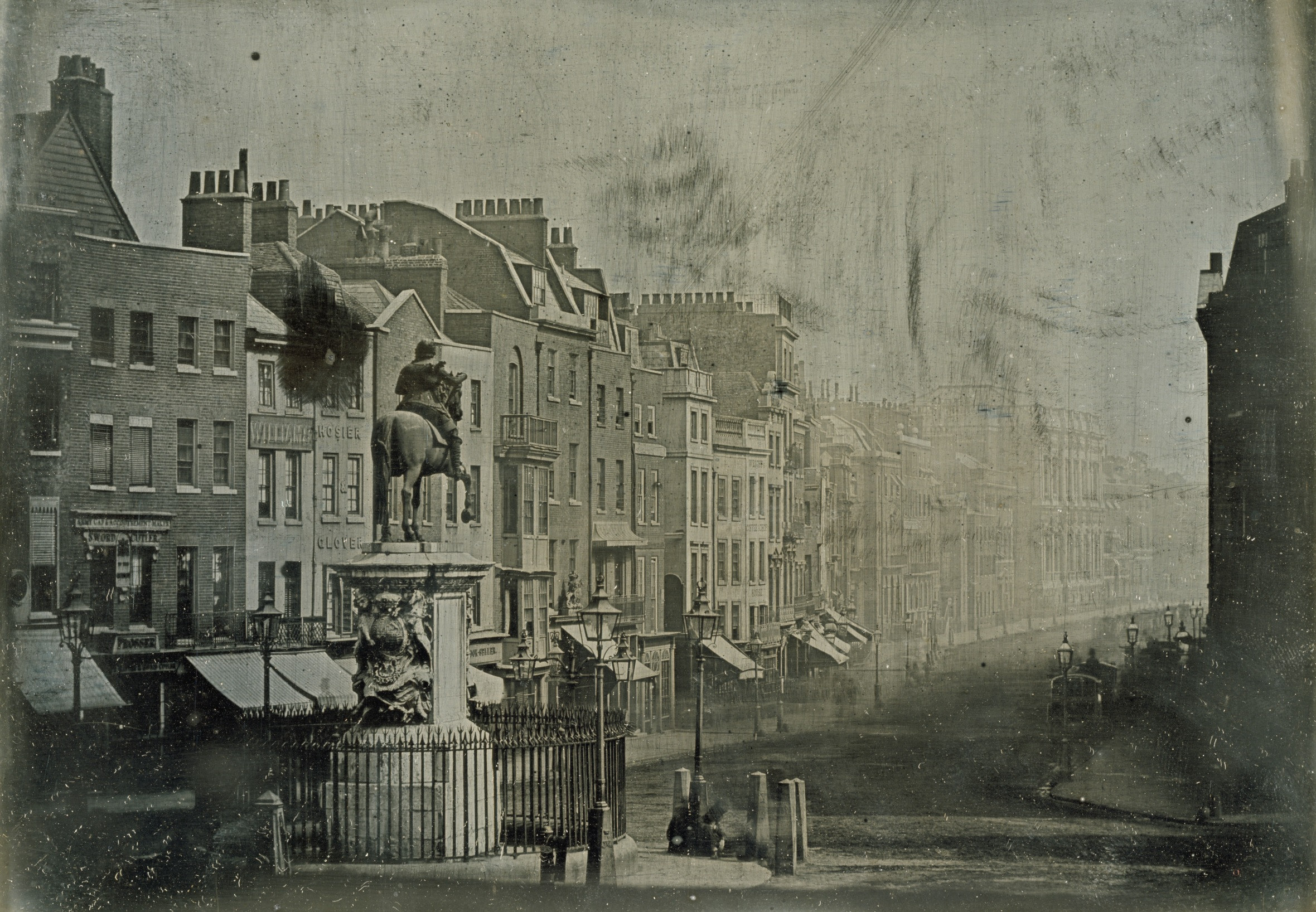
Parliament Street from Trafalgar Square, blurred with pedestrian and carriage traffic, 1839

During the 19th century, London grew enormously to become a global city of immense importance. It was the largest city in the world from about 1825, the world's largest port, and the heart of international finance and trade. Railways connecting London to the rest of Great Britain, as well as the London Underground, were built, as were roads, a modern sewer system and many famous sites.

== Overview ==
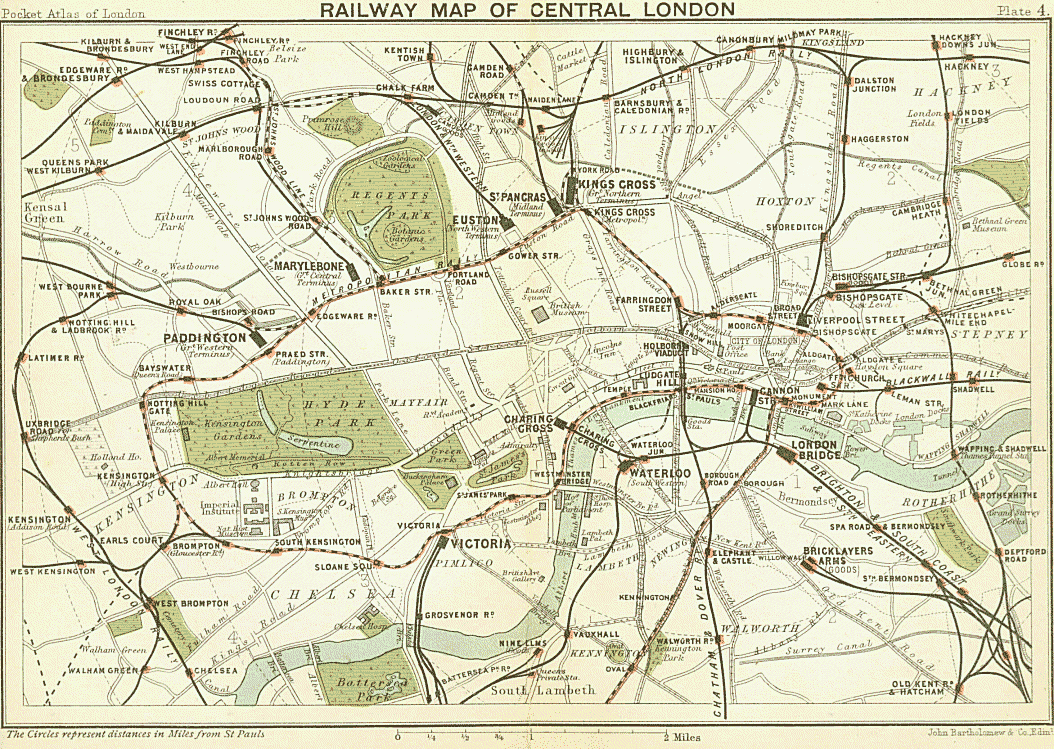
Railway map of London, 1899, from The Pocket Atlas and Guide to London

During the 19th century, London was transformed into the world's largest city and capital of the British Empire. The population rose from over 1 million in 1801 to 5.567 million in 1891. In 1897, the population of "Greater London" (defined here as the Metropolitan Police District plus the City of London) was estimated at 6.292 million. By the 1860s it was larger by one quarter than the world's second most populous city, Beijing, two-thirds larger than Paris, and five times larger than New York City.

At the beginning of the 19th century, the urban core of London was bounded to the west by Park Lane and Hyde Park, and by Marylebone Road to the north. It extended along the south bank of the Thames at Southwark, and to the east as far as Bethnal Green and Spitalfields. At the beginning of the century, Hyde Park Corner was considered the western entrance to London; a turnpike gate was in operation there until 1825. With the population growing at an increasing rate, so too did the territory of London expand significantly: the city encompassed 122 square miles in 1851 and had grown to 693 square miles by 1896.

During this period, London became a global political, financial, and trading capital. While the city grew wealthy as Britain's holdings expanded, 19th-century London was also a city of poverty, where millions lived in overcrowded and unsanitary slums. Life for the poor was immortalized by Charles Dickens in such novels as Oliver Twist.

One of the most famous events of 19th-century London was the Great Exhibition of 1851. Held at The Crystal Palace, the fair attracted visitors from across the world and displayed Britain at the height of its imperial dominance.

== Immigrants ==
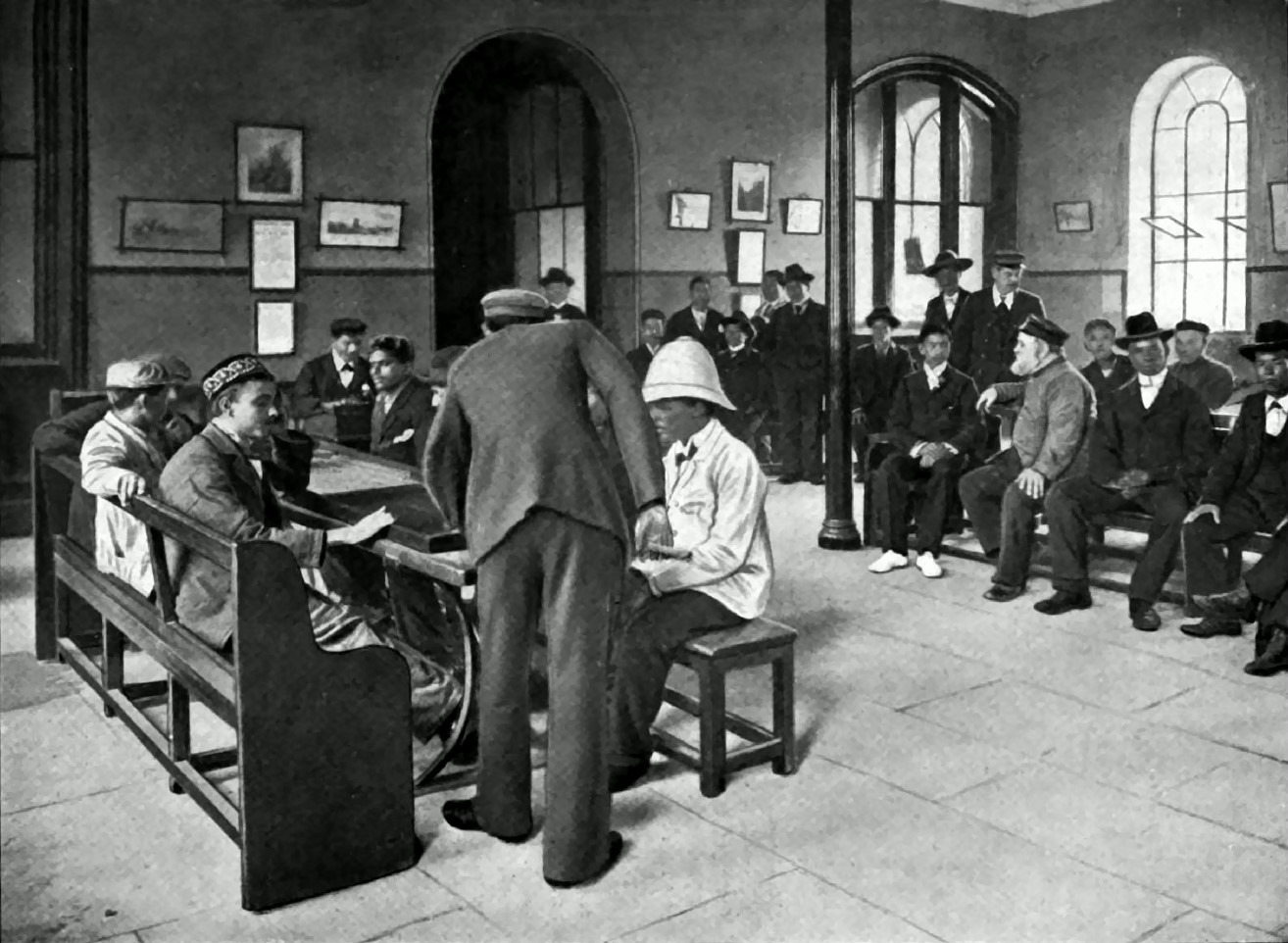
In the Main Hall of the Strangers' Home for Asiatics, Africans and South Sea Islanders, West India Dock, 1902

As the capital of a massive empire, London became a draw for immigrants from the colonies and poorer parts of Europe. A large Irish population settled in the city during the Victorian era, with many of the newcomers refugees from the Great Famine (1845–1849). At one point, Irish immigrants made up about 20% of London's population. In 1853 the number of Irish in London was estimated at 200,000, so large a population in itself that if it were a city it would have ranked as the third largest in England, and was about equal to the combined populations of Limerick, Belfast, and Cork.

London also became home to a sizable Jewish community, estimated to be around 46,000 in 1882, and a very small Indian population consisting largely of transitory sailors known as lascars. In the 1880s and 1890s tens of thousands of Jews escaping persecution and poverty in Eastern Europe came to London and settled largely in the East End around Houndsditch, Whitechapel, Aldgate, and parts of Spitalfields. Many came to find work in the sweatshops and markets of the rag trade, refashioning and re-selling clothing, which itself was centered around Petticoat Lane Market and the "Rag Fair" in Houndsditch, London's largest second-hand clothing market. As members of the Jewish community prospered in the latter part of the century, many left the East End and settled in the immediate suburbs of Dalston, Hackney, Stoke Newington, Stamford Hill, and parts of Islington.

An Italian community coalesced in Soho and in Clerkenwell, centered along Saffron Hill, Farringdon Road, Rosebery Avenue, and Clerkenwell Road. Out of the 11,500 Italians living in London in 1900, Soho accounted for 6,000, and Clerkenwell 4,000. Most of these were young men, engaged in occupations like organ grinding or selling street food (2,000 Italians were classed as "ice cream, salt, and walnut vendors" in 1900).

After the Strangers' Home for Asiatics, Africans and South Sea Islanders opened on West India Dock Road in 1856, a small population of Chinese sailors began to settle in Limehouse, around Limehouse Causeway and Pennyfields. The 1881 census recorded that of the 22 people who lived there, eleven were born in China, six in India or Sri Lanka, two in Arabia, two in Singapore and one in the Kru Coast of Africa. These men married and opened shops and boarding houses which catered to the transient population of "Chinese firemen, seamen, stewards, cooks and carpenters who serve on board the steamers plying between Germany and the port of London". London's first Chinatown, as this area of Limehouse became known, was depicted in novels like Charles Dickens' The Mystery of Edwin Drood and Oscar Wilde's The Picture of Dorian Gray as a sinister quarter of crime and opium dens.

== Economy ==
=== Port of London ===
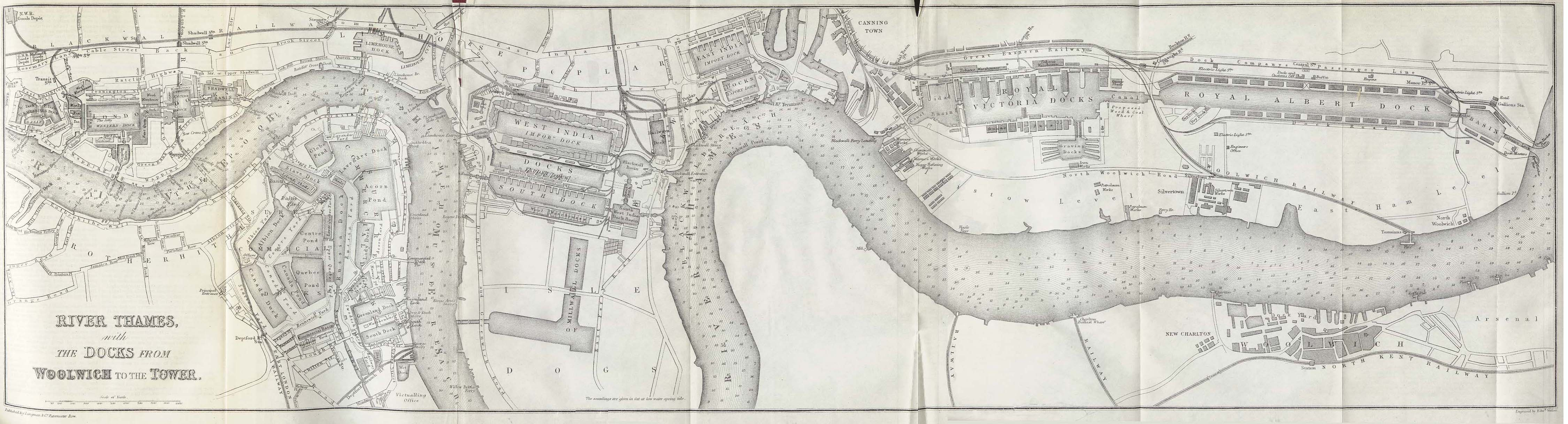
The Port of London docks in 1882, showing the newly completed Royal Albert Dock on the right side of the screan

London was both the world's largest port, and a major shipbuilding centre in itself, for the entire 19th century. At the beginning of the century, this role was far from secure after the strong growth in world commerce during the later decades of the 18th century rendered the overcrowded Pool of London incapable of handling shipping levels efficiently. Sailors could wait a week or more to offload their cargoes, which left the ships vulnerable to theft and enabled widespread evasion of import duties. Losses on imports alone from theft were estimated at £500,000 per year in the 1790s – estimates for the losses on exports have never been made. Anxious West Indian traders combined to fund a private police force to patrol Thames shipping in 1798, under the direction of magistrate Patrick Colquhoun and Master Mariner John Harriott. This Marine Police Force, regarded as the first modern police force in England, was a success at apprehending would-be thieves, and it was made a public force via the Depredations on the Thames Act 1800. In 1839 the force would be absorbed into and become the Thames Division of the Metropolitan Police.

In addition to theft, at the turn of the century commercial interests feared the competition from rising English ports like Liverpool and Plymouth. This spurred Parliament in 1799 to pass the Port of London Improvement and City Canal Act 1799 (39 Geo. 3. c. lxix) to authorize the first major dock construction work of the 19th century, the West India Docks, on the Isle of Dogs. Situated 6 miles (9.7 km) east of London Bridge, shipping could avoid the dangerous and congested upper reaches of the Thames. The three West India Docks were self-contained and accessed from the river via a system of locks and basins, offering an unprecedented level of security. The new warehouses surrounding the docks could accommodate close to a million tons of storage, with the Import and Export basins able to moor almost 400 ships at a time.

The Commercial Road was built in 1803 as a conduit for newly arrived goods from the Isle of Dogs straight into the City of London, and the Grand Junction Canal Act 1812 (52 Geo. 3. c. cxl) provided for the docks to be integrated into the national canal system via the extension of the Grand Union Canal to Limehouse. The Regent's Canal, as this new branch between Paddington and Limehouse became known, was the only canal link to the Thames, connecting a vital shipping outlet with the great industrial cities of The Midlands. The Regent's Canal became a huge success, but on a local rather than a national level because it facilitated the localized transport of goods like coal, timber, and other building materials around London. Easy access to coal shipments from northeast England via the Port of London meant that a profusion of industries proliferated along the Regent's Canal, especially gasworks, and later electricity plants.

Within a few years, the West India Docks were joined by the smaller East India Docks just northeast in Blackwall, as well as the London Docks in Wapping. The St Katharine Docks built just east of the Tower of London were completed in 1828, and later joined with the London Docks (in 1869). In Rotherhithe, where the Greenland Dock was operating at the beginning of the century, new docks, ponds and the Grand Surrey Canal were added in the early 19th century by several small companies. The area became known for specializing in commerce from the Baltic, Scandinavia, and North America, especially for its large timber ponds and grain imports from North America. In 1864 the various companies amalgamated to form the Surrey Commercial Dock Company, which by 1878 constituted 13 docks and ponds.

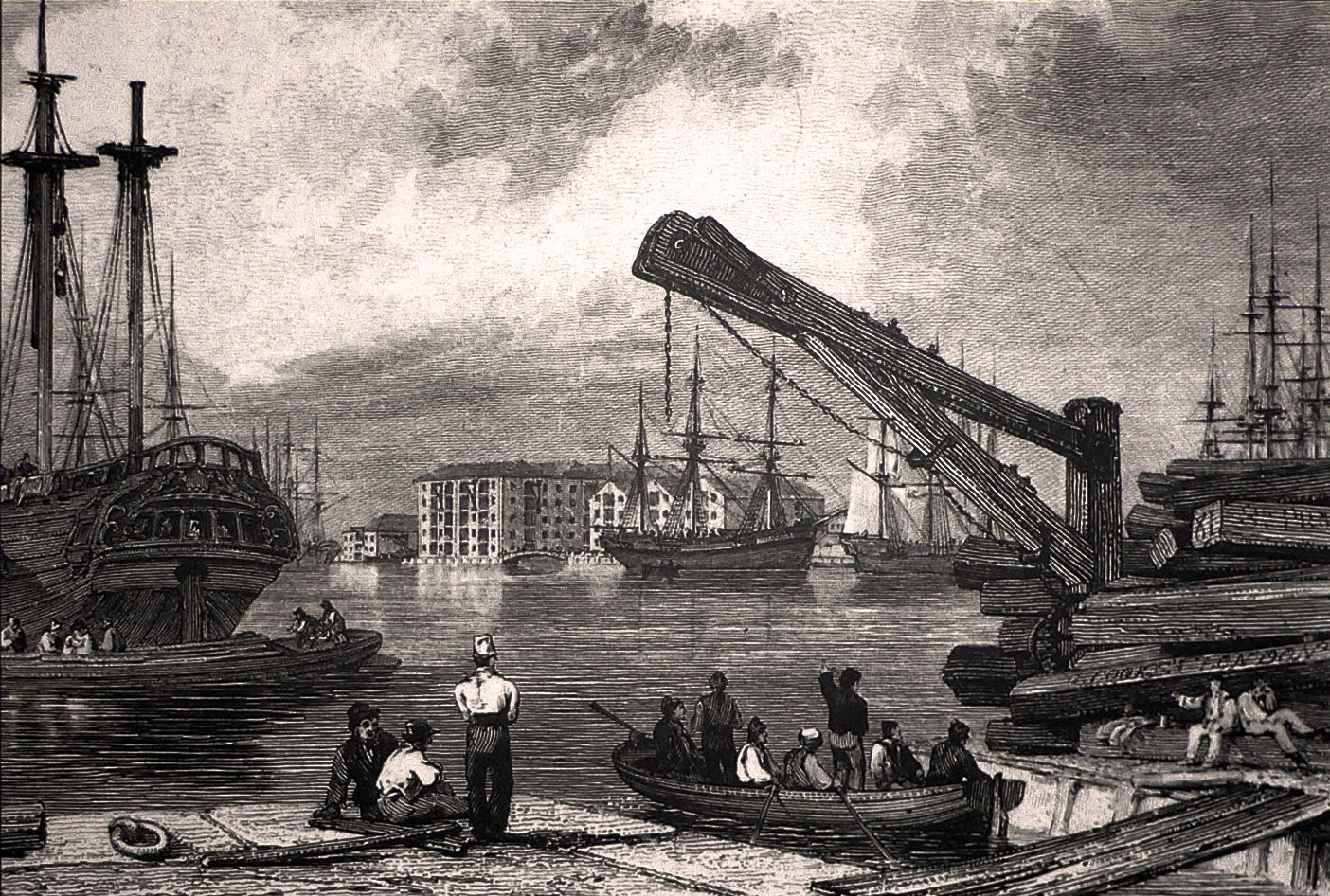
The Commercial Dock in Rotherhithe c. 1827, part of the Surrey Docks after 1864

With the eclipse of the sailing ship by the steamship in mid-century, tonnages grew larger and the shallow docks nearer the city were too small for mooring them. In response, new commercial docks were built beyond the Isle of Dogs: the Royal Victoria Dock (1855), the Millwall Dock (1868), the Royal Albert Dock (1880), and finally, the Port of Tilbury (1886), 26 miles east of London Bridge. The Victoria was unprecedented in size: 1.5 miles in total length, encompassing over 100 acres. Hydraulic locks and purpose-built railway connections to the national transport network made the Victoria as technologically advanced as it was large. It was a great commercial success, but within two decades it was becoming too shallow, and the lock entrance too narrow, for newer ships. The St. Katharine and London Dock Company built the Royal Albert Dock adjoining the Victoria; this new quay was 1.75 miles long, with 16,500 feet of deep water quayage. It was the largest dock in the world, the first to be electrically lit, featured hydraulically operated cranes, and like its sister the Victoria, was connected to the national railways. This feverish building obtained clear results: by 1880, the Port of London was receiving 8 million tons of goods a year, a 10-fold increase over the 800,000 being received in 1800.

Shipping in the Port of London supported a vast army of transport and warehouse workers, who characteristically attended the "call-on" each morning at the entrances to the docks to be assigned work for the day. This type of work was low-paid and highly unstable, drying up depending on the season and the vagaries of world trade. The poverty of the dock workers and growing trade union activism coalesced into the Great Strike of 1889, when an estimated 130,000 workers went on strike between 14 August and 16 September. The strike paralysed the port and led the dock owners to concede all of the demands of the strike committee, including a number of fairer working arrangements, the reduction of the "call-on", and higher hourly and overtime wages.

=== Shipbuilding ===
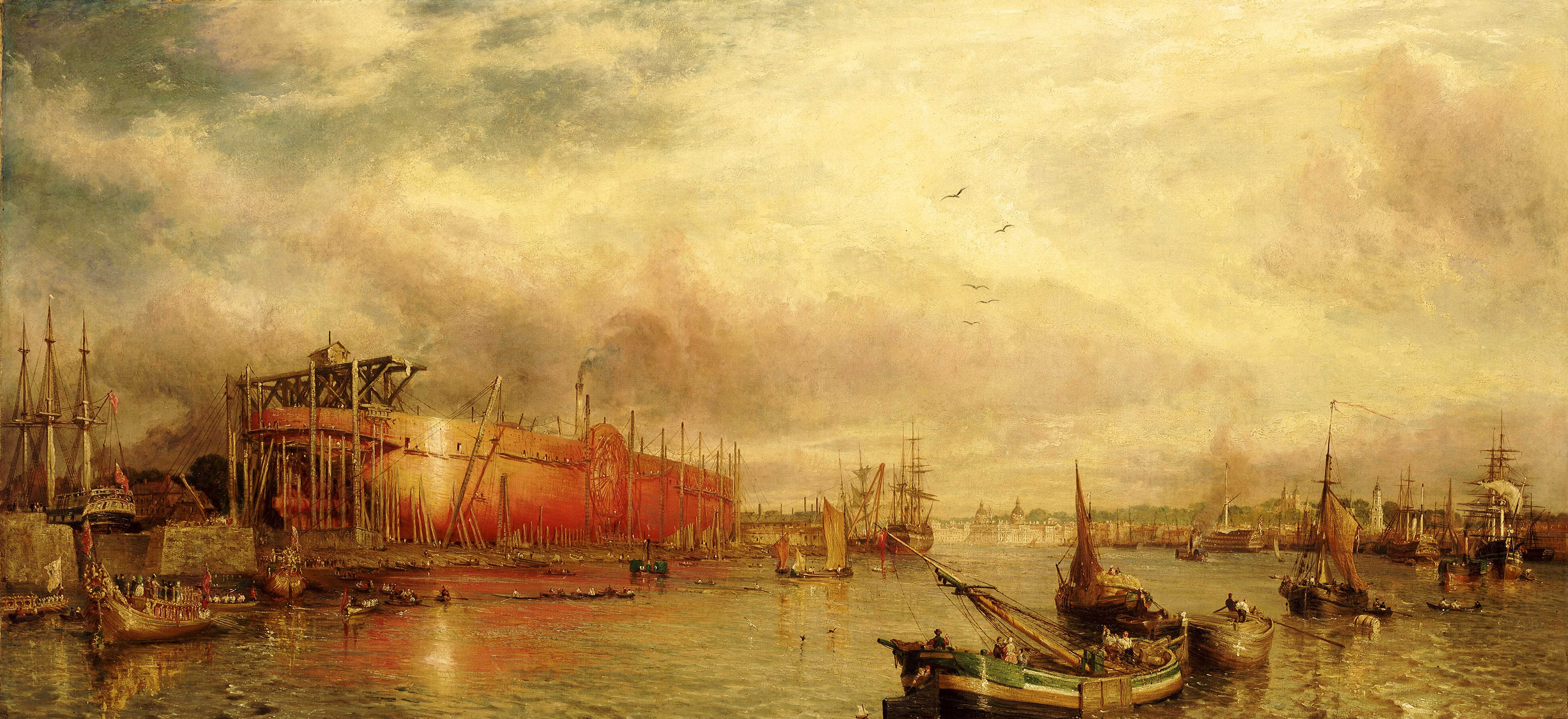
The Great Eastern under construction at Millwall, 1858

During the first half of the 19th century, the shipbuilding industry on the Thames was highly innovative and produced some of the most technologically advanced vessels in the world. The firm of Wigram and Green constructed Blackwall frigates from the early 1830s, a faster version of the East Indiaman sailing ship, while the naval engineer John Scott Russell designed more refined hulls for the ships constructed in his Millwall Iron Works. London shipyards had supplied about 60% of the Admiralty's warships in service in 1866. The largest shipbuilder on the Thames, the Thames Ironworks and Shipbuilding Company, produced the revolutionary broadside ironclad HMS Warrior (1860), the largest warship in the world and the first iron-hulled, armor plated vessel, alongside its sister HMS Black Prince (1861). Over the next few years, five out of the nine armored ironclads commissioned by the Navy to follow the example of the Warrior would be constructed in London. The Thames Ironworks was employed not just in shipbuilding, but in civil engineering works around London like Blackfriars Railway Bridge, Hammersmith Bridge, and the construction of the iron-girded roofs of Alexandra Palace and the 1862 International Exhibition building.

London engineering firms like Maudslay, Sons and Field and John Penn and Sons were early developers and suppliers of marine steam engines for merchant and naval ships, fueling the transition from sail to steam powered locomotion. This was aided by the 1834 invention by Samuel Hall of Basford, Nottingham of a condenser for cooling boilers which used fresh water rather than corrosive salt water. In 1838 the first screw-propelled steamer in the world, SS Archimedes, was launched at Ratcliff Cross Dock, an alternative to the less efficient paddle steamer. By 1845 the Admiralty had settled upon screw propellers as the optimal form of propulsion, and a slew of new battleships were built in London dockyards equipped with the new technology. The largest and most famous ship of its day, the SS Great Eastern, a collaboration between John Scott Russell and Isambard Kingdom Brunel, was constructed at the Millwall Iron Works and launched in 1858. It still holds the record as the largest ship to have been launched on the Thames, and held the record as the largest ship in the world by tonnage until 1901.

Despite the astonishing successes of the shipbuilding industry in the first half of the century, in the last decades of the 19th century the industry experienced a precipitous decline that would leave only one large firm, the Thames Ironworks, in existence by the mid-1890s. London shipyards lacked the capacity, and the ability to expand, for building the large vessels in demand by the later 19th century, losing business to newer shipyards in Scotland and the North of England, where labor and overhead costs were lower, and iron and coal deposits much closer. The ancient Royal Dockyards at Woolwich and Deptford, founded by Henry VIII in the 16th century, were too far upriver and too shallow due to the silting up of the Thames, forcing their closure in 1869.

=== Finance ===
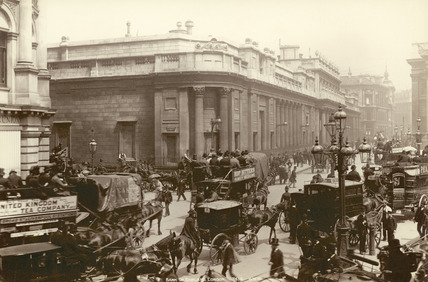
Traffic in front of the Bank of England in the City of London, 1885–1895

The City of London's importance as a financial centre increased substantially over the course of the 19th century. The city's strengths in banking, stock brokerage, and shipping insurance made it the natural channel for the huge rise in capital investment which occurred after the end of the Napoleonic Wars in 1815. The city was also the headquarters of most of Britain's shipping firms, trading houses, exchanges and commercial firms like railway companies and import houses. As the Industrial Revolution gathered pace, an insatiable demand for capital investment in railways, shipping, industry and agriculture fueled the growth of financial services in the city. The end of the Napoleonic Wars also freed up British capital to flow overseas; there was some £100 million invested abroad between 1815 and 1830, and as much as £550 million by 1854. At the end of the century, the net total of British foreign investment stood at £2.394 billion. The 1862 Bradshaw's Guide to London listed 83 banks, 336 stockbroking firms, 37 currency brokers, 248 ship and insurance brokerages, and 1500 different merchants in the city, selling wares of every conceivable variety. At the centre of this nexus of private capital and commerce lay the Bank of England, which by the end of the century contained £20 million worth of gold reserves. It employed over 900 people and printed 15,000 new banknotes each day by 1896, doing some £2 million worth of business each day.

The result of the shift to financial services in the city was that, even while its residential population was ebbing in favor of the suburbs (there was a net loss of 100,000 people between 1840 and 1900), it retained its historical role as the center of English commerce. The working population swelled from some 200,000 in 1871 to 364,000 by 1911.

== Housing ==
London's great expansion in the 19th century was driven by housing growth to accommodate the rapidly expanding population of the city. The growth of transport in London in this period fueled the outward expansion of suburbs, as did a cultural impetus to escape the inner city, allowing the worlds of 'work' and 'life' to be separate. Suburbs varied enormously in character and in the relative wealth of their inhabitants, with some being for the very wealthy, and others being for the lower-middle classes. They frequently imitated the success of earlier periods of speculative housing development from the Georgian era, although the Victorian era saw a much wider array of suburban housing built in London. Terraced, semi-detached and detached housing all developed in a multitude of styles and typologies, with an almost endless variation in the layout of streets, gardens, homes, and decorative elements.

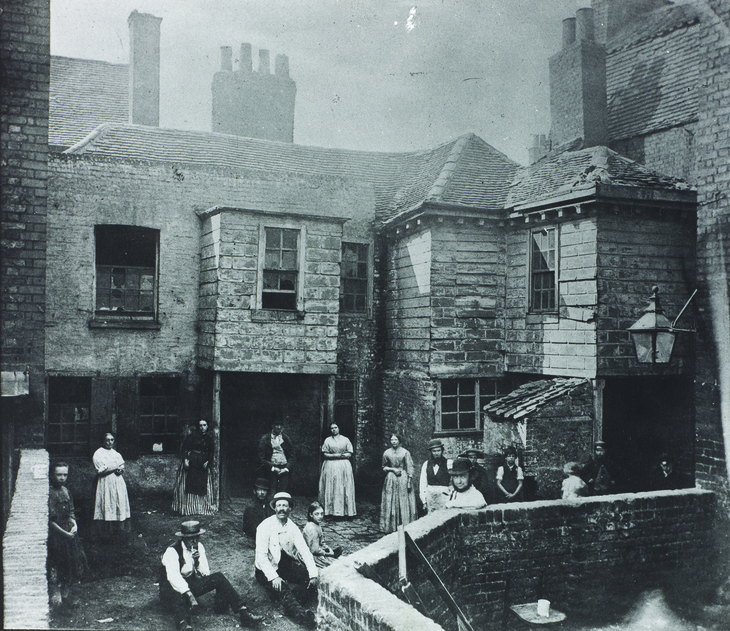
A slum in Market Court, Kensington, 1860s

Suburbs were aspirational for many, but also came to be lampooned and satirised in the press for the conservative and conventional tastes they represented (for example in Punch's Pooter). While the Georgian terrace has been described as "England's greatest contribution to the urban form", the increasing rigour with which Building Act regulations were applied after 1774 led to increasingly simple, standardised designs, which by the end of the 19th century were accommodating many households at the lower end of the socio-economic scale. Indeed, more grandly designed examples became less common by this period, as the very wealthy tended to prefer detached homes, and terraces in particular now became associated first with the aspirational middle classes, and later with the lower middle classes in more industrial areas of London such as the East End.

While many areas of Georgian and Victorian suburbs were damaged heavily in The Blitz and/or then redeveloped through slum clearance, much of Inner London's character remains dominated by the suburbs built successively during Georgian and Victorian times, and such houses remain enormously popular.

== Living conditions ==
=== Poverty ===
In contrast to the conspicuous wealth of the cities of London and Westminster, there was a huge underclass of desperately poor Londoners within a short range of the more affluent areas. The author George W. M. Reynolds commented on the vast wealth disparities and misery of London's poorest in 1844:

"The most unbounded wealth is the neighbor of the most hideous poverty...the crumbs which fall from the tables of the rich would appear delicious viands to starving millions, and yet these millions obtain them not! In that city there are in all five prominent buildings: the church, in which the pious pray; the gin-palace, to which the wretched poor resort to drown their sorrows; the pawn-broker's, where miserable creatures pledge their raiment, and their children's raiment, even unto the last rag, to obtain the means of purchasing food, and – alas! too often – intoxicating drink; the prison, where the victims of a vitiated condition of society expiate the crimes to which they have been drive by starvation and despair; and the workhouse, to which the destitute, the aged, and the friendless hasten to lay down their aching heads – and die!"

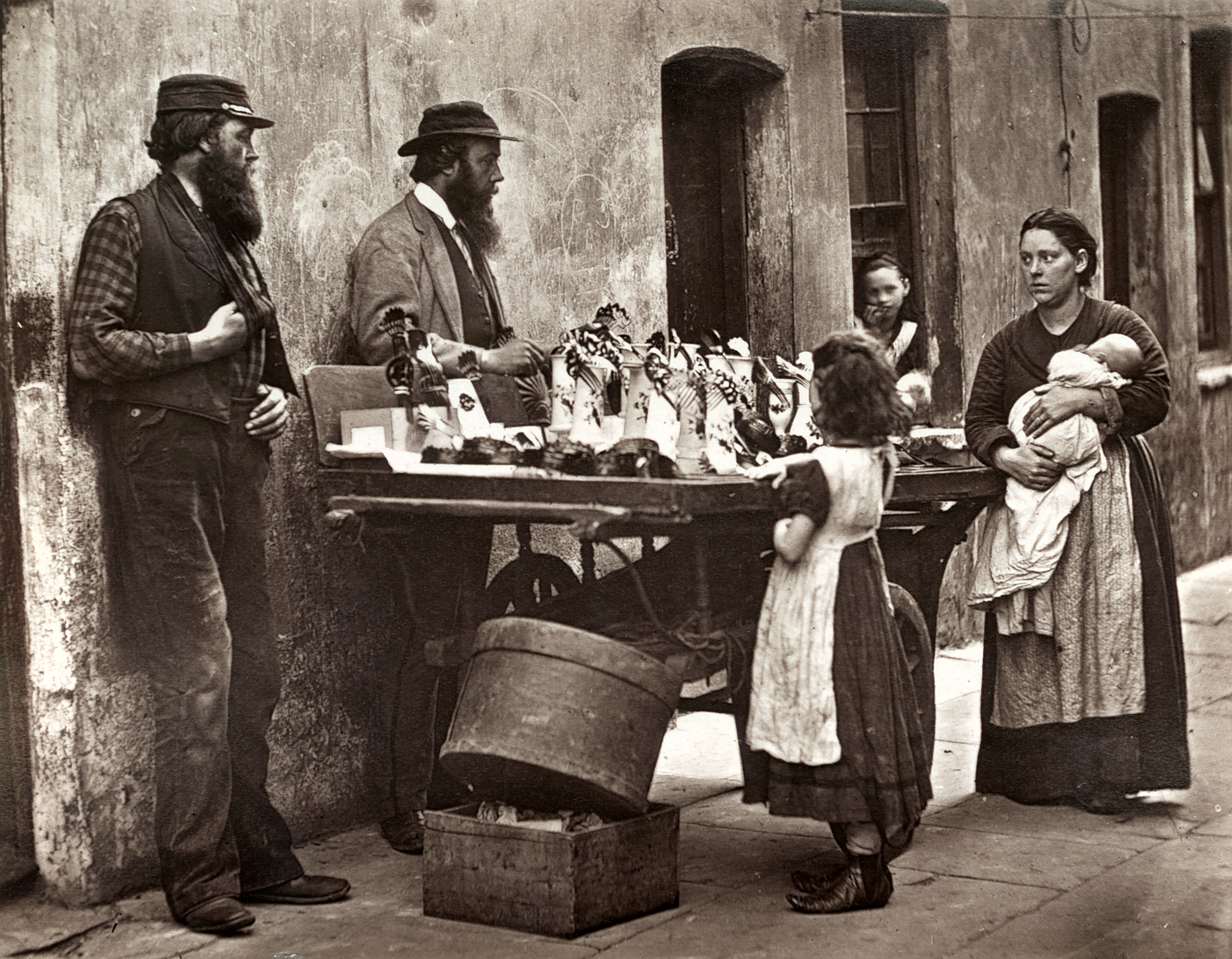
A small market stall in London, 1870s

In Central London, the single most notorious slum was St. Giles, a name which by the 19th century had passed into common parlance as a byword for extreme poverty. Infamous since the mid 18th century, St. Giles was defined by its prostitutes, gin shops, secret alleyways where criminals could hide, and horribly overcrowded tenements. Lord Byron excoriated the state of St. Giles in a speech to the House of Lords in 1812, stating that "I have been in some of the most oppressed provinces of Turkey, but never under the most despotic of infidel governments did I behold such squalid wretchedness as I have seen since my return in the very heart of a Christian country." At the heart of this area, now occupied by New Oxford Street and Centre Point, was "The Rookery", a particularly dense warren of houses along George Street and Church Lane, the latter of which in 1852 was reckoned to contain over 1,100 lodgers in overpacked, squalid buildings with open sewers. The poverty worsened with the massive influx of poor Irish immigrants during the Great Famine of 1848, giving the area the name "Little Ireland", or "The Holy Land". Government intervention beginning in the 1830s reduced the area of St. Giles through mass evictions, demolitions, and public works projects. New Oxford Street was built right through the heart of "The Rookery" in 1847, eliminating the worst part of the area, but many of the evicted inhabitants simply moved to neighboring streets, which remained stubbornly mired in poverty.

Mass demolition of slums like St. Giles was the usual method of removing problematic pockets of the city; for the most part this just displaced existing residents because the new dwellings built by private developers were often far too expensive for the previous inhabitants to afford. In the mid to late 19th century, philanthropists like Octavia Hill and charities like the Peabody Trust focused on building adequate housing for the working classes at affordable rates: George Peabody built his first improved housing for the "artisans and laboring poor" on Commercial Street in 1864. The Metropolitan Board of Works (the dominant authority before the LCC), was empowered to undertake clearances and to enforce overcrowding and other such standards on landlords by a stream of legislation including the Labouring Classes Dwelling Houses Act 1866 (29 & 30 Vict. c. 28) and the Labouring Classes Dwelling Houses Act 1867 (30 & 31 Vict. c. 28). Overcrowding was also defined as a public health 'nuisance' beginning in 1855, which allowed Medical Officers to report landlords in violation to the Board of Health. The shortcomings of the existing legislation were refined and condensed into one comprehensive piece of legislation, the Housing of the Working Classes Act 1890 (63 & 64 Vict. c. 59). This empowered the LCC to construct its own housing on cleared land, which it had been prohibited from doing before; thus began a social housing building program in targeted areas like Bethnal Green and Millbank that would accelerate in the next century.

==== The East End ====
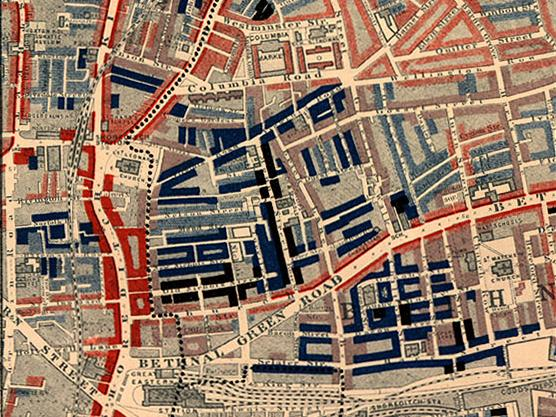
Part of Charles Booth's poverty map showing the Old Nichol, a slum in the East End of London. Published 1889 in Life and Labour of the People in London. The red areas are "middle class, well-to-do", light blue areas are "poor, 18s to 21s a week for a moderate family", dark blue areas are "very poor, casual, chronic want", and black areas are the "lowest class...occasional labourers, street sellers, loafers, criminals and semi-criminals".

The East End of London, with an economy oriented around the Docklands and the polluting industries clustered along the Thames and the River Lea, had long been an area of working poor. By the late 19th century it was developing an increasingly sinister reputation for crime, overcrowding, desperate poverty, and debauchery. The 1881 census counted over 1 million inhabitants in the East End, a third of whom lived in poverty. The Cheap Trains Act 1883 (46 & 47 Vict. c. 34), while it enabled many working class Londoners to move away from the inner city, also accentuated the poverty in areas like the East End, where the most destitute were left behind. Prostitution was rife, with one official report in 1888 recording 62 brothels and 1,200 prostitutes in Whitechapel (the real number was likely much higher).

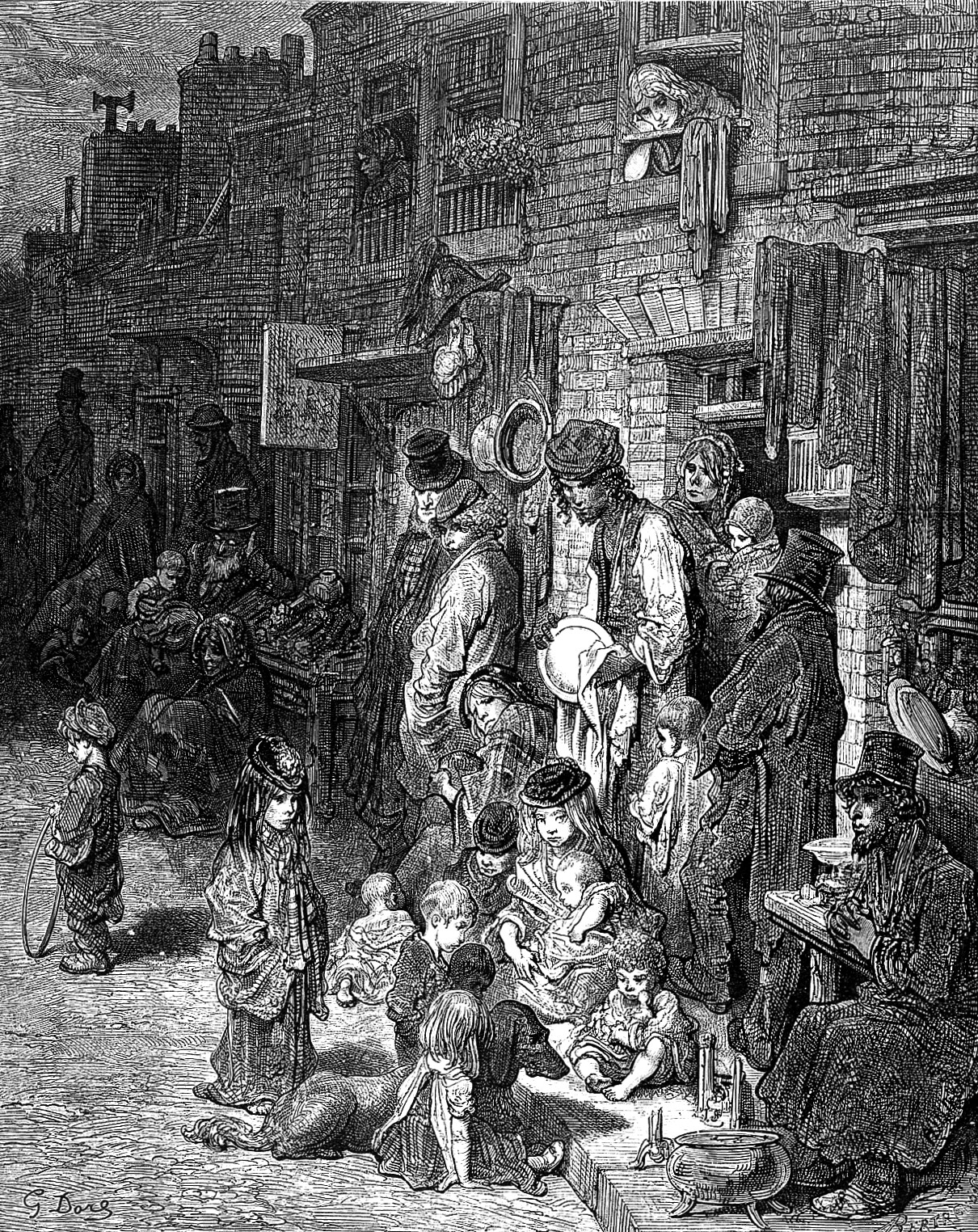
"Wentworth Street, Whitechapel" (1872), by Gustave Doré

The American author Jack London, in his 1903 account The People of the Abyss, described the bewilderment of Londoners when he mentioned that he planned to visit the East End: many of them had never been there despite living in the same city. He was refused a guide when he visited the travel agency of Thomas Cook & Son, which told him to consult the police. When he finally found a reluctant cabbie to take him into Stepney, he described his impression as follows:

"Nowhere in the streets of London may one escape the sight of abject poverty, while five minutes' walk from almost any point will bring one to a slum; but the region my hansom was now penetrating was one unending slum. The streets were filled with a new and different race of people, short of stature, and of wretched or beer-sodden appearance. We rolled along through miles of bricks and squalor, and from each cross street and alley flashed long vistas of bricks and misery. Here and there lurched a drunken man or woman, and the air was obscene with sounds of jangling and squabbling."

By the time of Jack London's visit in 1903, the reputation of the East End was at its lowest ebb after decades of unfavourable attention from journalists, authors, and social reformers. The 1888 Whitechapel murders perpetrated by Jack the Ripper brought international attention to the squalor and criminality of the East End, while penny dreadfuls and a slew of sensational novels like George Gissing's The Nether World and the works of Charles Dickens painted grim pictures of London's deprived areas for middle and upper class readers. The single most influential work on London poverty was Charles Booth's Life and Labour of the People in London, a 17-volume work published between 1889 and 1903. Booth painstakingly charted levels of deprivation throughout the city, painting a bleak but also sympathetic picture of the wide variety of conditions experienced by London's poor.

=== Disease and mortality ===
The extreme population density in areas like the East End made for unsanitary conditions and resulting epidemics of disease. The child mortality rate in the East End stood at 20%, while the estimated life expectancy of an East End labourer was only 19 years. In Bethnal Green, one of London's poorest districts, the mortality rate stood at 1 in 41 in 1847. The average for Bethnal Green between the years 1885 and 1893 remained virtually the same as that of 1847. Meanwhile, the mortality average for those same eight years in the wealthy boroughs of Kensington and Paddington stood at roughly 1 in 53. London's overall mortality rate was tracked at a ratio of roughly 1 in 43 between the years 1869–1879; overall life expectancy in the city stood at just 37 years in midcentury.

The most serious disease in the poor quarters was tuberculosis, until the 1860s cholera, as well as rickets, scarlet fever, and typhoid. Between 1850 and 1860 the mortality rate from typhoid was 116 per 100,000 people. Smallpox was a dreaded disease across London: there were epidemics in 1816–19, 1825–26, 1837–40, 1871 and 1881. A speckling of workhouse hospitals and the London Smallpox Hospital in St Pancras (moved to Highgate Hill in 1848–50), were all that existed to treat smallpox victims until the latter part of the century. This changed with the creation of the Metropolitan Asylums Board in 1867, which embarked on the building of five planned smallpox and fever hospitals in Stockwell, Deptford, Hampstead, Fulham and Homerton to serve the different regions of London. Fearful residents succeeded in blocking the building of the Hampstead hospital, and residents in Fulham obtained an injunction preventing all but local cases of smallpox from being treated in their hospital. Thus, with only three hospitals in operation when the epidemic of 1881 began, the MAB was overwhelmed. HMS Atlas and Endymion were leased as hospital ships and entered service in July 1881, moored at Greenwich. The following year the two ships were purchased along with another, Castalia, and the fleet was moved to Long Reach at Gravesend, where it served 20,000 patients between 1884 and 1902. The floating hospitals were equipped with their own river ferry service to transport patients in isolation from the inner city. The ships enabled three permanent isolation hospitals to be built at Dartford, effectively ending the threat of smallpox epidemics.

== Transport ==
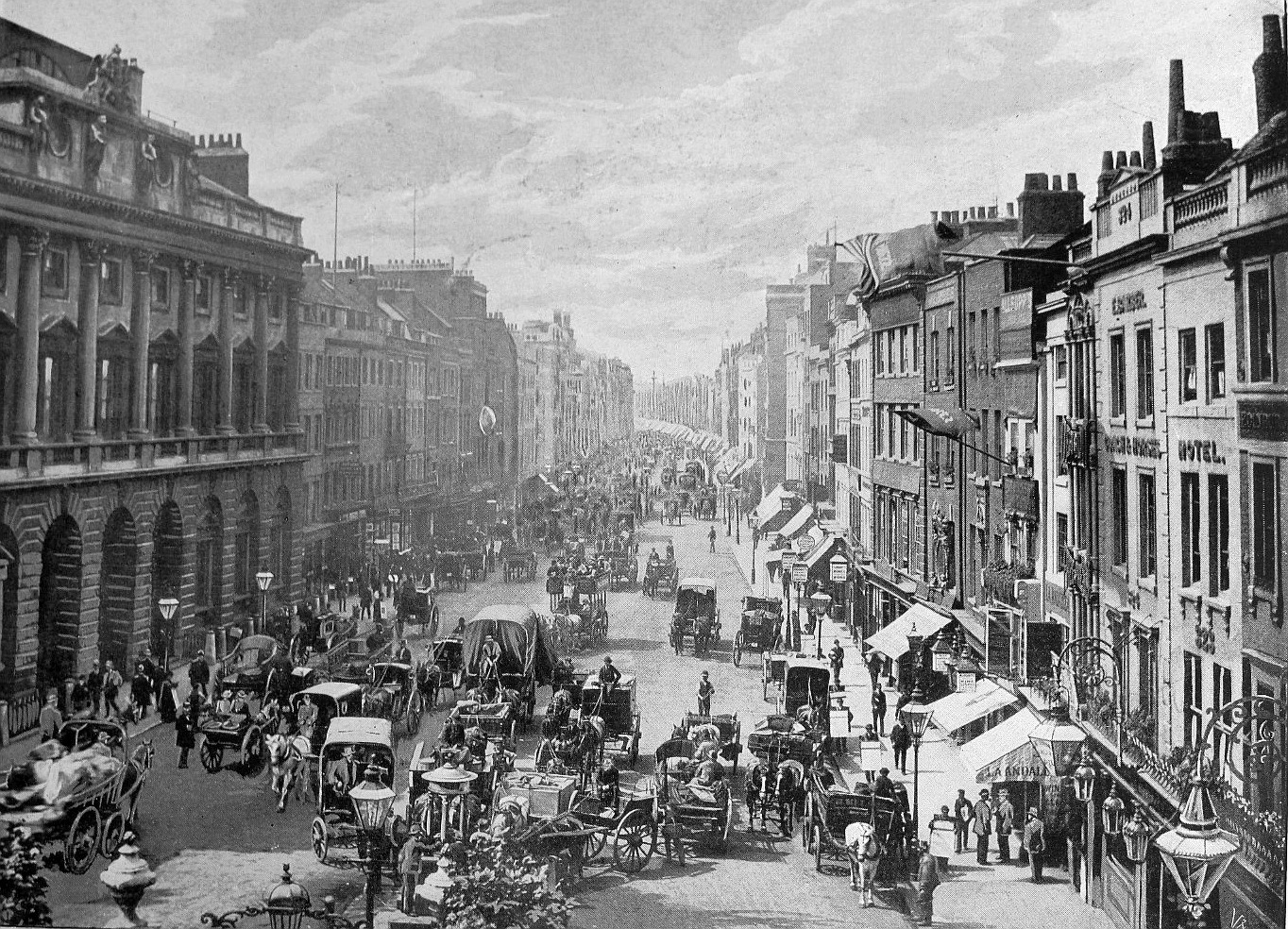
Traffic on the Strand in the late 19th century (Somerset House is on the left.)

With the great railway terminals developing to connect London with its suburbs and beyond, mass transport was becoming ever more important within the city as its population increased. The first horse-drawn omnibuses entered service in London in 1829. By 1854 there were 3,000 of them in service, painted in bright reds, greens, and blues, and each carrying an average of 300 passengers per day. The two-wheeled hansom cab, first seen in 1834, was the most common type of cab on London's roads throughout the Victorian era, but there were many types, like the four-wheeled Hackney carriage, in addition to the coaches, private carriages, coal-wagons, and tradesmen's vehicles which crowded the roads. There were 3,593 licensed cabs in London in 1852; by the end of the century there were estimated to be some 10,000 in all.

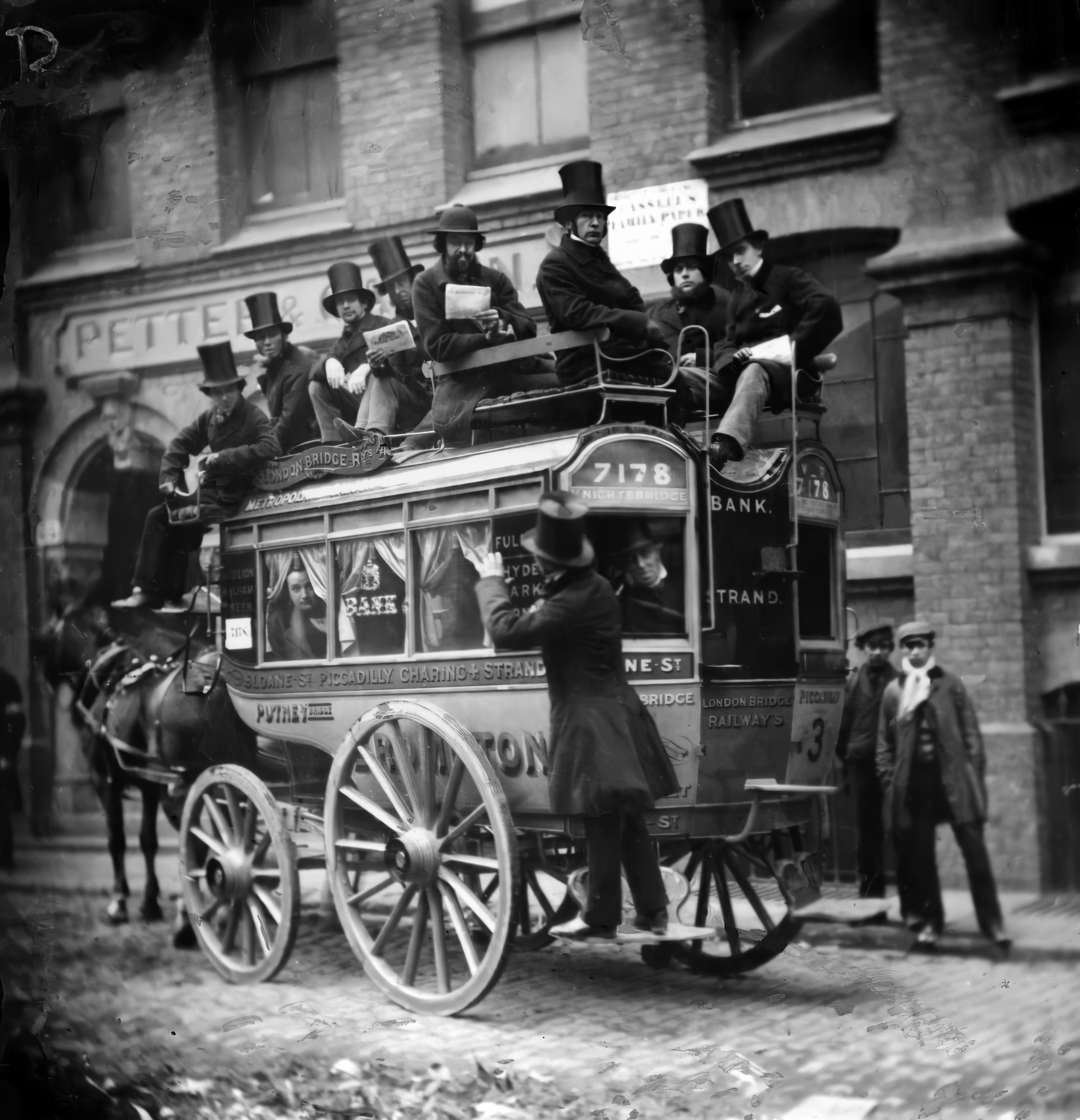
A London omnibus in 1865

From the 1870s onwards, Londoners also had access to a developing tram network which accessed Central London and provided local transport in the suburbs. The first horse-drawn tramways were installed in 1860 along the Bayswater Road at the northern edge of Hyde Park, Victoria Street in Westminster, and Kennington Street in South London. The trams were a success with passengers, but the raised rails were jolting and inconvenient for horse-drawn vehicles to cross, causing traffic bottlenecks at crossroads. Within a year the outcry was so great that the lines were pulled up, and trams were not reintroduced until the Tramways Act 1870 (33 & 34 Vict. c. 78) permitted them to be built again. Trams were restricted to operating in the suburbs of London, but they accessed the major transport hubs of the City and the West End, conveying passengers into and away from the suburbs. By 1893 there were about 1,000 tram cars across 135 miles worth of track. Trams could be accessed in Central London from Aldgate, Blackfriars Bridge, Borough, Moorgate, King's Cross, Euston Road, Holborn, Shepherd's Bush, Victoria, and Westminster Bridge.

=== Coming of the railways ===
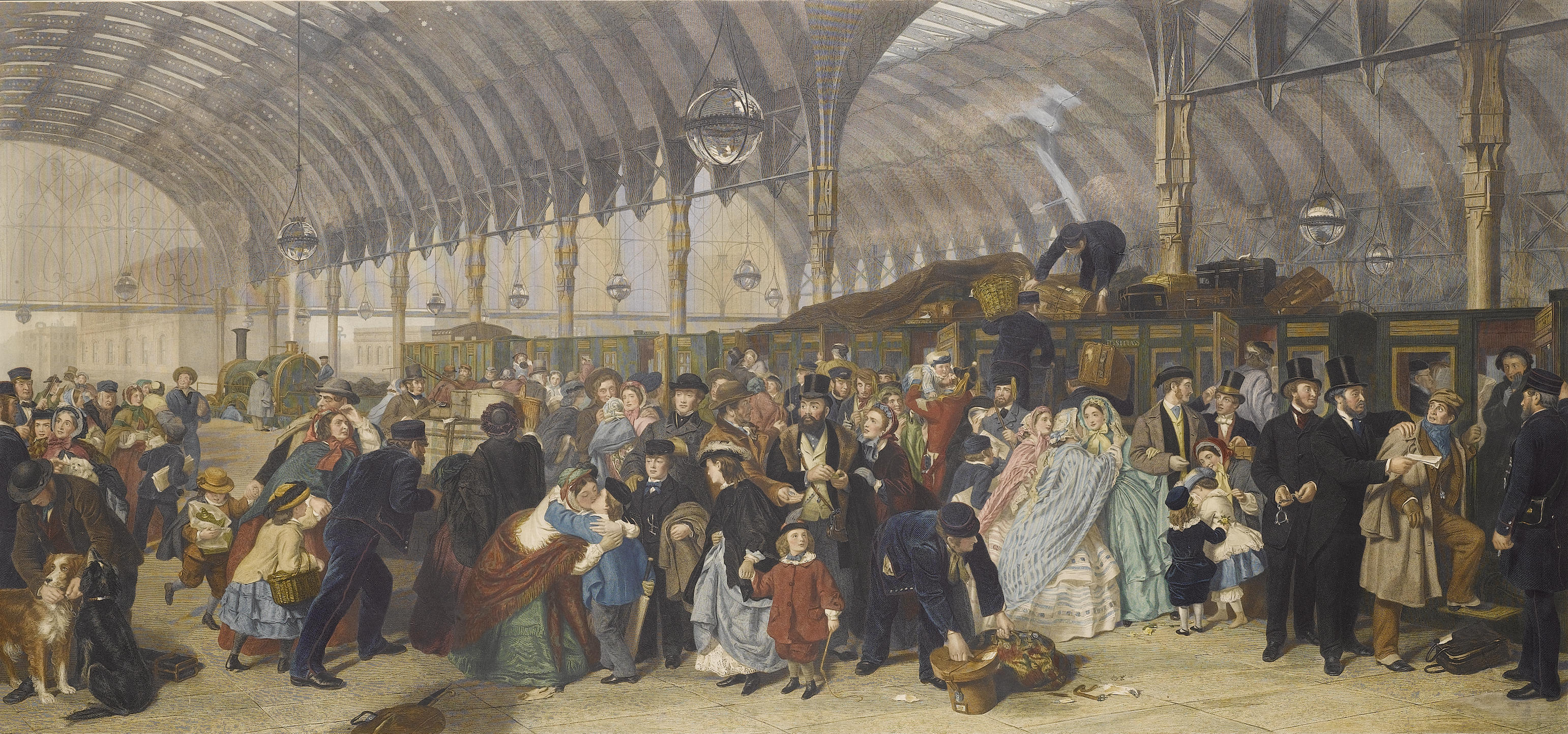
Frith's The Railway Station, 1862 depiction of Paddington railway station in London

19th-century London was transformed by the coming of the railways. A new network of metropolitan railways allowed the development of suburbs in neighboring counties from which middle-class and wealthy people could commute to the centre. While this spurred the massive outward growth of the city, London's growth also exacerbated the class divide, as the wealthier classes emigrated to the suburbs, leaving the poor to inhabit the inner city areas. The new railway lines were generally built through working class areas, where land was cheaper and compensation costs lower. In the 1860s, the railway companies were required to rehouse the tenants they evicted for construction, but these rules were widely evaded until the 1880s. The displaced generally stayed in the same area as before, but under more crowded conditions due to the loss of housing.

The first railway to be built in London was the London and Greenwich Railway, a short line from London Bridge to Greenwich, which opened in 1836. This was soon followed by great rail termini which linked London to every corner of Britain. These included Euston (1837), Paddington (1838), Fenchurch Street (1841), Waterloo (1848), King's Cross (1852), and St Pancras (1868). By 1865 there were 12 principal railway termini; the stations built along the lines in exurban villages surrounding London allowed commuter towns to be developed for the middle classes. The Cheap Trains Act 1883 helped poorer Londoners to relocate, by guaranteeing cheap fares and removing a duty imposed on fares since 1844. The new working class suburbs created as a result included West Ham, Walthamstow, Kilburn, and Willesden.

=== London Underground ===
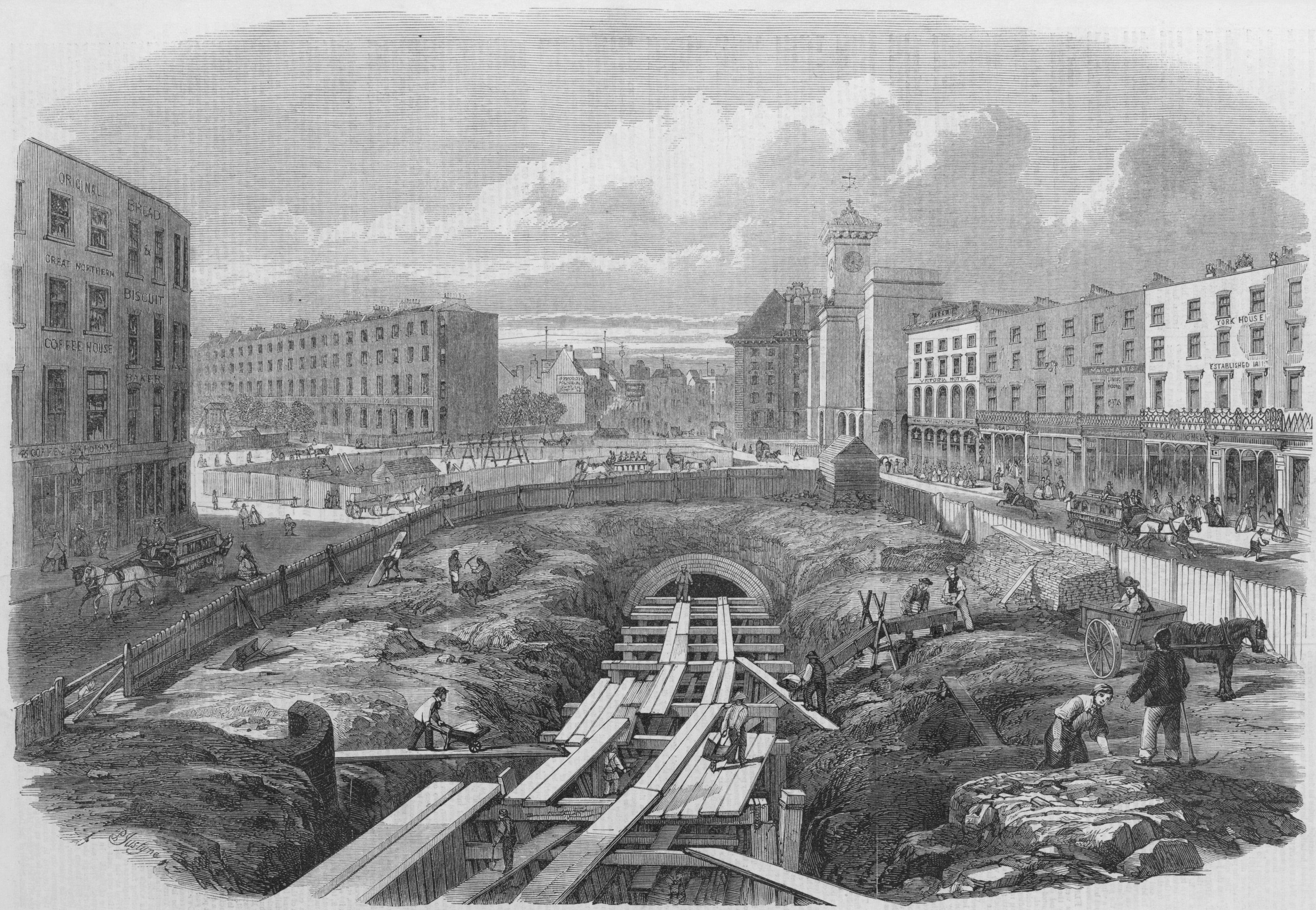
Construction of the Metropolitan Railway, London's first Underground line, in 1861

With traffic congestion on London's roads becoming more and more serious, proposals for underground railways to ease the pressure on street traffic were first mooted in the 1840s, after the opening of the Thames Tunnel in 1843 proved such engineering work could be done successfully. However, reservations over the stability of underground tunneling persisted into the 1860s and were finally overcome when Parliament approved the construction of London's first underground railway, the Metropolitan Railway. Begun in 1860 and completed in 1863, the Metropolitan inaugurated the world's oldest mass transit system, the London Underground; it was created by the cut-and-cover method of excavating a trench from above, then building reinforced brick walls and vaults to form the tunnel, and filling in the trench with earth. The Metropolitan initially ran from Farringdon in the east to Paddington in the west. The open wooden passenger cars were propelled by a coke-fueled steam locomotive and lit with gas lamps to provide illumination in the tunnels. The line was a success, carrying 9.5 million passengers in its first year of operation. An extension to the western suburb of Hammersmith was built and opened in 1868. In 1884 the Metropolitan was linked with the Metropolitan District Line at Aldgate to form an inner circle encompassing Central London (the modern Circle Line), with a short stretch running from Aldgate to Whitechapel. In 1880 an extension line to the north-west was opened from Baker Street tube station to the village of Harrow, via Swiss Cottage and St. John's Wood, expanding further over the coming decades and allowing prosperous suburbs to be developed around formerly rural villages.

A succession of private enterprises were formed to build new routes after the success of the Metropolitan, the first being the Metropolitan District Line, opened in 1865. This line extended along the Thames from Westminster to South Kensington at first, but by 1889 it had been extended eastwards to Blackfriars, and south-west all the way to Wimbledon.

The next line to be built, and the first true "tube", dug with a tunnelling shield designed by J. H. Greathead rather than by cut-and-cover excavation, was the City and South London Railway (later the city branch of the Northern line), opened in 1890. It was London's first underground line with electric locomotives, and the first to extend south of the river. Electrification allowed the tunnels to be dug deep below ground level, as ventilation for smoke and steam was no longer necessary. In the year 1894, an estimated 228,605,000 passengers used the three underground railways then in operation, compared to 11,720,000 passengers in 1864 using the lone Metropolitan Railway. Before the century came to a close, a second deep-level tube was opened in 1898: the Waterloo & City Line. The shortest of the London tube lines, it was built to convey commuters between the City of London and Waterloo station.

== Infrastructure ==
=== Roads ===
Many new roads were built after the formation of the Metropolitan Board of Works in 1855. They included the Embankment from 1864, Northumberland Avenue, Clerkenwell and Theobalds Roads all from 1874. The MBW was authorized to create Charing Cross Road and Shaftesbury Avenue in the Metropolitan Streets Improvement Act 1877 (40 & 41 Vict. c. ccxxxv), the intention being to improve communication between Charing Cross, Piccadilly Circus, Oxford Street, and Tottenham Court Road. This required extensive demolition in the slums of Soho and St. Giles, with the MBW responsible for rehousing over 3,000 labourers in new-built tenements over the ten-year period it took to construct the roads.

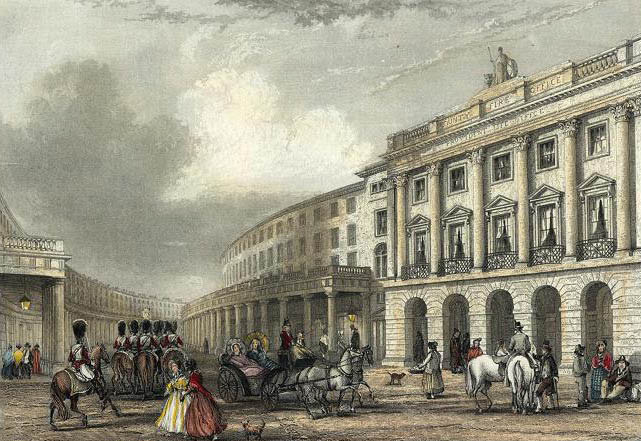
Regent Street Quadrant from Piccadilly Circus, 1837

One of the most ambitious urban redesign initiatives was the building of Regent Street at the behest of the Prince Regent, who wished to build a grand boulevard linking his Carlton House in the south with Regent's Park in the north (which had reverted to Crown ownership in 1811). The new road had several benefits: it cleared a warren of narrow streets in Westminster in favour of a symmetrical, aesthetically pleasing street which not only relieved traffic congestion but, by providing a direct north–south route, allowed the rural area around Regent's Park to be profitably developed for residential use. Regent Street was also meant to provide a clear separation between the fashionable new development of Mayfair to the west, and the by then undesirable area of Soho to the east. The plans, designed by John Nash, were approved by the New Street Act 1813 (53 Geo. 3. c. 121), and by 1819 Nash's grand colonnaded, stucco-covered buildings were largely open for business. The street stretches from Pall Mall at its southern end (built closer to the Haymarket to avoid St. James's Square), and crosses Piccadilly (thus creating Piccadilly Circus), from where it curves west via the Quadrant and then runs due north, joining with Langham Place and Portland Place to create the link to Regent's Park. The area achieved its intended purpose as a thriving commercial district, lined with shops of every variety to rival the quality of nearby St. James's.

1890 London had 5,728 street accidents, resulting in 144 deaths. London was the site of the world's first traffic lights, installed at the crossroads of Bridge, Great George, and Parliament Streets outside the Houses of Parliament. The 20 ft (6-metre) high column was topped by a large gas lamp, and opened in December 1868. It was designed by the railway engineer J. P. Knight after a railway semaphore signal, with multi-coloured arms coming down to regulate traffic.

=== Engineering ===
19th century London was the site of unprecedented engineering marvels. One of these was the Thames Tunnel, declared the "Eighth Wonder of the World" when it opened in 1843. Designed by Marc Isambard Brunel, it was the first tunnel in the world to be successfully built under a navigable river and took 18 grueling years to complete. Laborers employed to dig the tunnel, with the protection of Brunel's tunneling shield, endured five serious floods and multiple gas and sewage leaks, which caused numerous casualties and long delays. Although it was intended as an underground artery for the movement of goods between Rotherhithe and Wapping, it opened as a pedestrian tunnel during its early decades (there were 1 million visitors to the tunnel in its first 3 months of opening). Only in 1865 was it purchased by the East London Railway and converted for railway use.

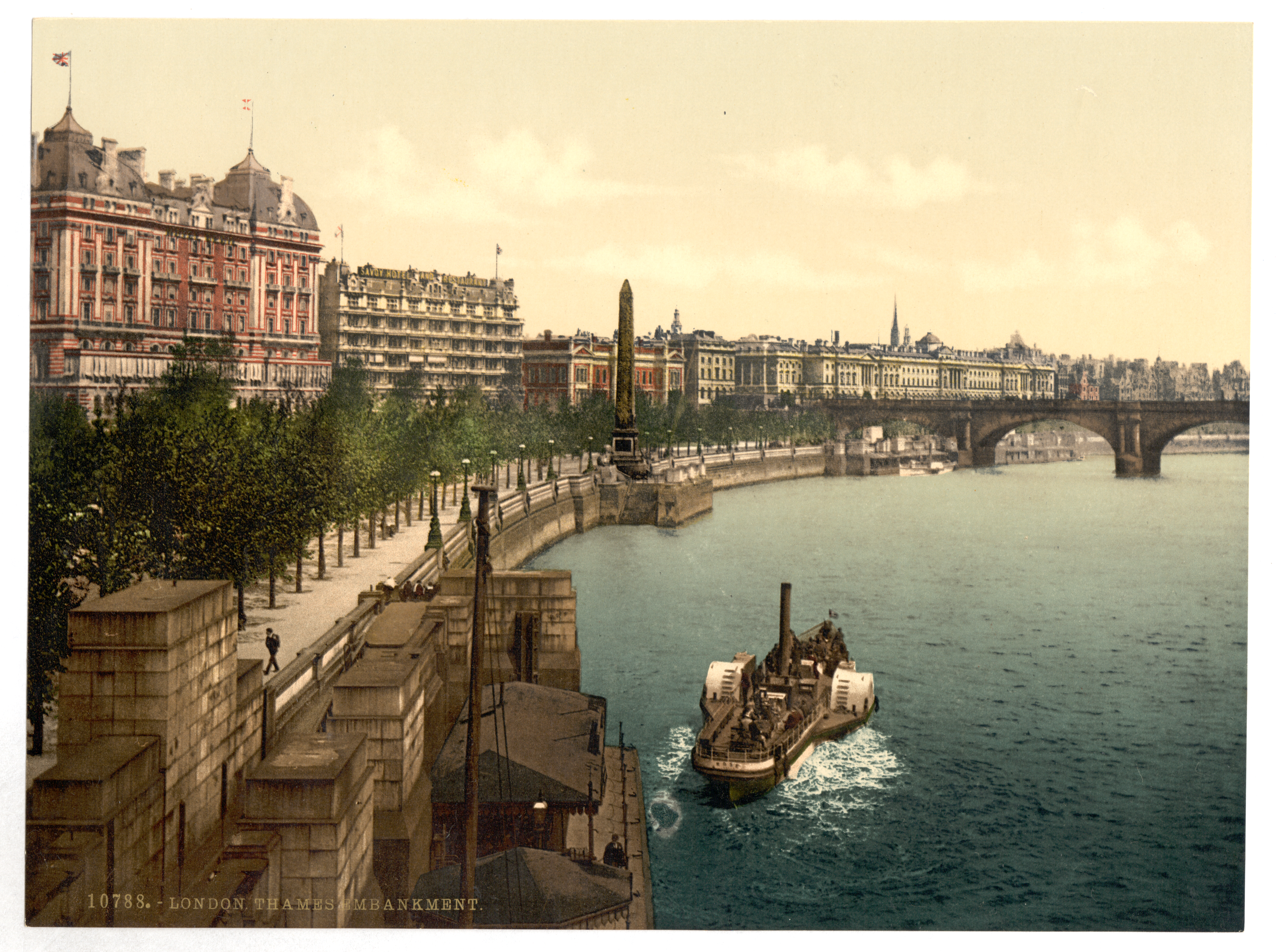
1890s postcard of the Victoria Embankment

The Thames Embankment was one of the most ambitious public works projects in 19th century London. It transformed the appearance of the riverside between Chelsea and Blackfriars. There were three different sections: the Victoria Embankment, built between 1864 and 1870; the Albert Embankment (1866–70); and the Chelsea Embankment (1871–74). The embankments protected low-lying areas along the Thames from flooding, provided a more attractive prospect of the river compared to the mudflats and boatyards which abounded previously, and created prime reclaimed land for development.

The Victoria Embankment was the most ambitious: it concealed a massive interceptor sewage tunnel, which channelled waste from a network of smaller tunnels away from the River Thames and out of Central London, towards the Northern Outfall Sewer at Beckton in East London. The Victoria Embankment also allowed an extension of the Metropolitan District Line underground to be built, from Westminster east to Blackfriars. In total, the Victoria Embankment reclaimed over 37 acres (15 hectares) of land from the Thames, allowing a broad east–west boulevard to be built and a series of public gardens.

All three sections of the Thames Embankment are faced in grey granite, mounted with handsome cast iron lamps, and lined with London planes. In 1878, the lamps of the Victoria Embankment were converted from gas to electric light, making it the first street in Britain to be electrically illuminated. Walter Thornbury praised the new construction in his Old and New London of 1878:

"not only has the [Victoria] Embankment added a handsome frontage to the side of the Thames, which previously had been a public eyesore, but it has also been the means of getting rid of the unequal deposits of mud in its bed, assisting the removal of the scour of the river, and consequently improving the health of the inhabitants of London."

=== Bridges ===
There was a flurry of bridge-building along the Thames from the City of London westwards during the 19th century, improving overland communication to Southwark. In 1800 there were only three bridges connecting Westminster and the city to the south bank: Westminster Bridge, Blackfriars Bridge, and the ancient London Bridge. West of Westminster, the closest bridge was Battersea Bridge, three miles upstream. The four stone bridges grew progressively more decrepit as traffic increased: Westminster Bridge was badly subsiding by the 1830s, and several piers collapsed in 1846. Blackfriars was structurally unsound, requiring substantial repairs between 1833 and 1840. Old London Bridge, whose 20 piers dated back to the 13th century, so impeded the flow of the river that it formed dangerous rapids for boats, and its narrow width of 26 ft could not accommodate modern traffic levels. It was the first to be replaced, by a 49-foot (15-metre) wide granite bridge with five supporting arches. "New" London Bridge was built from 1824 to 1831, with the adjacent "Old" London Bridge fully dismantled by 1832. New Westminster Bridge, made of cast iron and resting on seven arches, was opened in 1862, replacing its unstable predecessor, and Blackfriars Bridge was demolished and rebuilt in cast iron beginning in 1864.

In addition, several new bridges for road, pedestrian, and railway traffic were built: Southwark Bridge (1819), Waterloo Bridge (1817), Hungerford Bridge (opened in 1845 as a footbridge, and converted in 1859 into a combination footbridge/railway bridge for Charing Cross Station), and Tower Bridge (1894). Further upriver, the new bridges included Lambeth Bridge (1862), which replaced a centuries-old cross-river ferry service, Vauxhall Bridge (opened 1816), Victoria Bridge (opened in 1858 and later renamed Chelsea Bridge), and Wandsworth Bridge (1873).

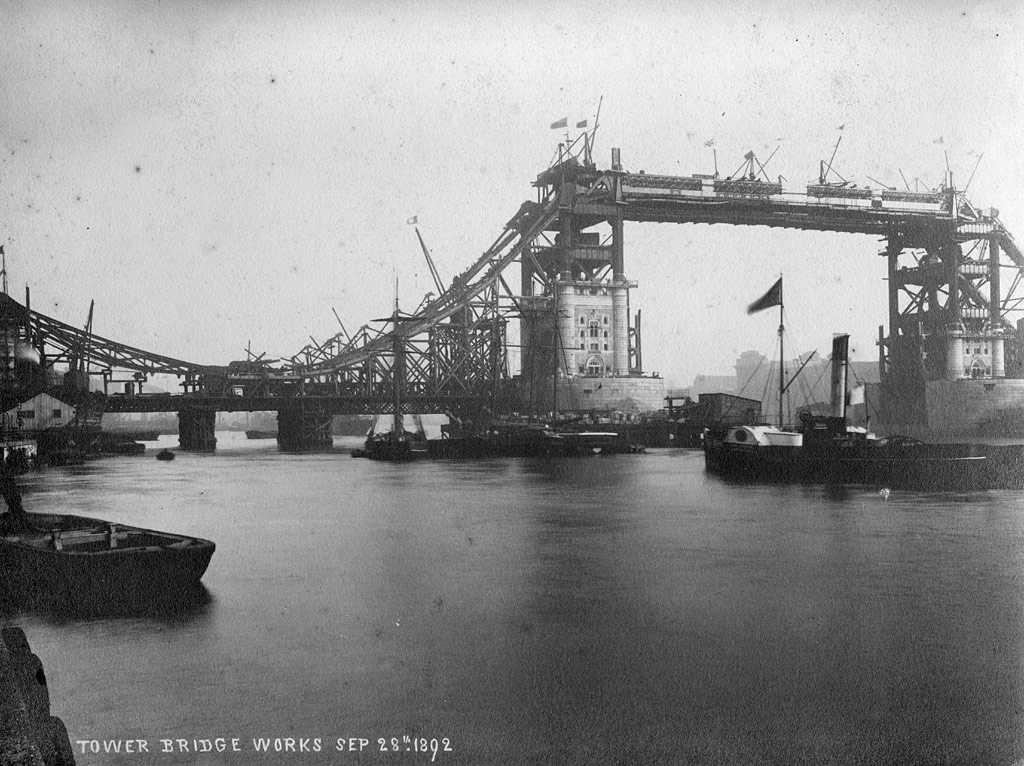
Tower Bridge under construction, 1892

The impetus for this building was London's massive population growth, which put a constant strain on existing communications between the north and south banks. The want of overland bridges was one of the issues cited by the Illustrated London News in an editorial of 1854 enumerating the most urgent needs of the city. London Bridge remained the city's busiest artery for the entire century, averaging 22,242 vehicle and 110,525 pedestrian crossings per day in 1882. More than 30 petitions were submitted to various authorities between 1874 and 1885 requesting that the bridge either be widened or rebuilt to relieve congestion. This resulted in the commission of Tower Bridge by the Corporation of London (Tower Bridge) Act 1885 (48 & 49 Vict. c. cxcv). This was a bascule bridge designed by Sir Horace Jones, completed in 1895. It was an engineering marvel which solved the conundrum of how to bridge the Thames downriver from London Bridge without inhibiting shipping in the Pool of London. Using a 200 ft (60-metre) wide central bay, the bascules, or drawbridge, could be raised on either side by massive hydraulic accumulators, allowing clearance for ships up to 140 ft (43 metres) in height. It rests on two piers sunk deep into the river bed, constituting some 70,000 tons of concrete and stone, while the towers and bridge itself are framed in 11,000 tons of steel clad in Cornish granite and Portland stone.

=== Lighting ===
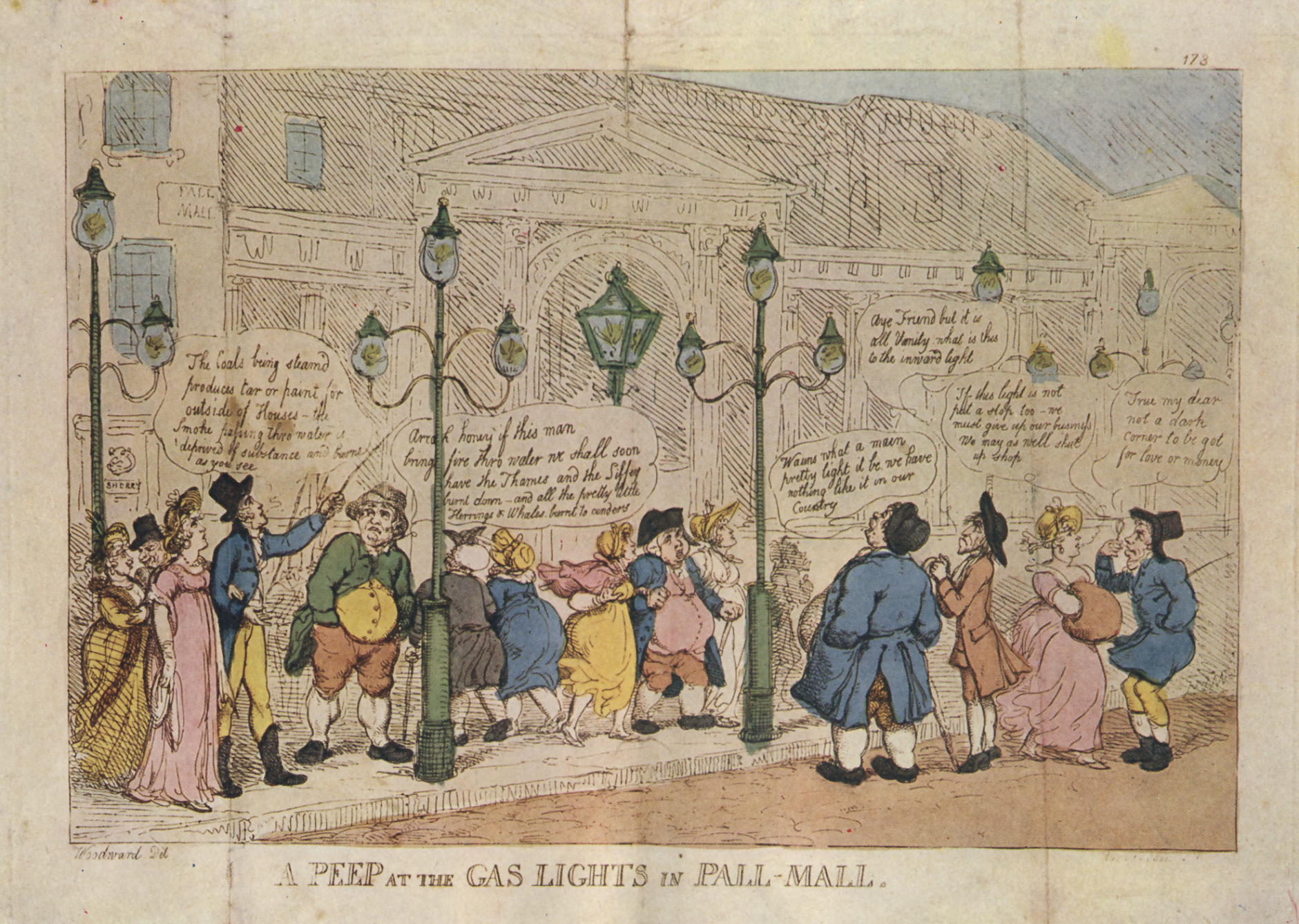
A caricature of the first gas street lights along Pall Mall in 1809

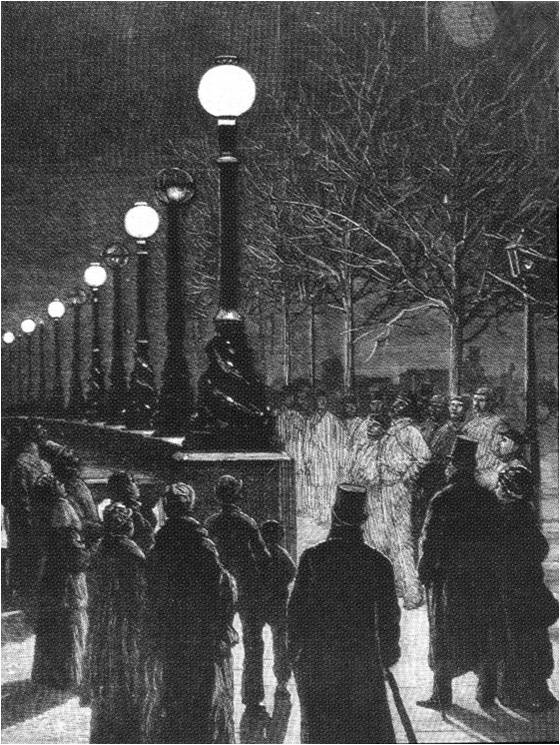
Electric light provided by Yablochkov candles, on the Victoria Embankment in December 1878

The development of gas lighting at the beginning of the 19th century provided London with comprehensive street illumination for the first time in its history. Before this, oil lamps were used along the main thoroughfares, but they were only required to be lit during the darkest time of the year (between Michaelmas on 29 September and Lady Day on 25 March), and then only as late as midnight. The first gaslight in London was installed in the Lyceum Theatre in 1804, by the German-born entrepreneur F. A. Winsor. "Winsor patent Gas", supplied by Winsor's New Light and Heat Company, would be installed along the north side of Pall Mall to celebrate George III's birthday in 1805. The Westminster Gas Light and Coke Company was incorporated by the Gas Light and Coke Company Act 1810 (50 Geo. 3. c. clxiii) and the first gas works in the UK were established by the company at Peter Street and Horseferry Road to provide gas to Westminster. In 1813, Westminster Bridge was lit by gaslight, and the London theatres installed gas between 1817 and 1818. Gaslight was quickly adopted for shop window displays because it enabled owners to better display their wares, but it was slower to be adopted in private homes, not gaining ground until the 1840s. Gas light made streets safer, allowed shops to stay open well after dark, and even improved literacy because of the brighter interiors gas facilitated.

By 1823 there were some 40,000 gas street lamps, across 215 miles of streets. By 1880 there were one million gas street lamps in London, and the gas works were consuming 6.5 million tons of coal annually. The city became noteworthy for the brightness of its streets, shopfronts, and interiors at night compared to other European cities. The last precinct to resist gas lighting was Grosvenor Square, which did not install it until 1842. There were 12 gas companies in operation in London in the 1840s, with gas works and gas holders becoming an increasingly recognizable feature of the city. The largest of the gas works were those of the London Gas Company at Vauxhall, which piped gas as far away as Highgate and Hampstead, 7 miles from Vauxhall. The Metropolitan Gas Act 1860 granted monopolies to the various companies in allotted districts, intended to end the fierce competition for territory which had prevailed in the 1850s. This had the unintended effect of raising prices, as the companies exploited their newly secure monopolies. Parliamentary select committees were set up between 1866 and 1868 to look into the matter, which found that gas in London was more expensive and of lower quality than in other English cities. The committees recommended various improvements including price reductions, better regulation, and consolidation. These recommendations were enacted first in the city with the City of London Gas Act 1868, and within a few years the provisions were expanded across most of London. By the end of the 1870s, there were just six gas companies in operation in London, compared to 13 in the 1860s.

In the last decades of the 19th century, electric lighting was introduced sporadically, but was slow to supersede gas. In November and December 1848, two competing inventors (M. Le Mott and William Staite) gave demonstrations of their respective electric lamps to astonished crowds at the National Gallery, atop the Duke of York Column, and aboard a train departing from Paddington station. It would take another three decades for this novelty to be installed on any permanent basis, delayed by the expense of electricity and the lack of generating facilities. In December 1878, electric arc lamps were installed along the Victoria Embankment as an experiment to gauge the respective brightness of gas vs. electricity, and the latter was judged superior by the Board of Works. In 1879, Siemens installed electric light in the Royal Albert Hall and along Waterloo Bridge, while the first large power station in the metropolis opened at Deptford. Another major advancement was the construction of the Edison Electric Light Station at Holborn Viaduct in 1882, the world's first coal-fueled power station for public use. The station, opened by Thomas Edison's Edison Electric Light Company, powered 968 lamps (later expanded to 3,000) stretching from Holborn Viaduct to St. Martin's Le Grand, using Edison carbon-filament incandescent light bulbs.

== Culture ==
=== Museums ===
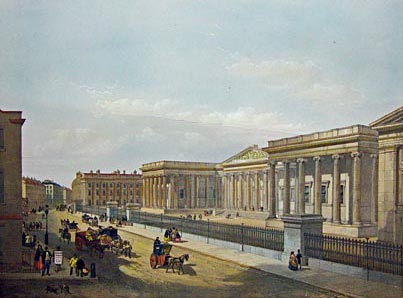
The British Museum façade overlooking Great Russell Street in 1852

Several of modern London's major museums were founded or constructed during the 19th century, including the British Museum (built 1823–1852), The National Gallery (built 1832–8), the National Portrait Gallery (founded 1856), and the Tate Britain, which opened in 1897 as the National Gallery of British Art. The British Museum had been established by the British Museum Act 1753, and housed since that time in the 17th century Montagu House in Bloomsbury. With the donation of the King's Library in 1822, which comprised some 120,000 manuscripts, pamphlets, and drawings assembled by the late George III, a major extension of the museum was needed. Montagu House was demolished and the quadrangular current building, with its imposing Greek Revival façade designed by Sir Robert Smirke, rose gradually through 1857, with the East Wing the first to be completed in 1828. The Round Reading Room, which was built to occupy the vacant courtyard behind the main building, featured the second largest dome in the world when it was finished (140 feet in diameter). By 1878 the Reading Room contained 1.5 million printed volumes across some 25 miles of shelves.

The great complex of museums at South Kensington began with the purchase of a vast tract of land (known as Albertopolis) at the instigation of the Prince Consort and the Royal Commission for the Exhibition of 1851. The profits from the Exhibition were put toward the purchase of the land, which was intended to host a complex of cultural, scientific and educational institutions. The first of these was the South Kensington Museum (now known as the Victoria & Albert Museum), which opened to the public in 1856. The South Kensington Museum at that time inhabited the 'Brompton Boilers' building designed by William Cubitt, and consisted of the collections of manufactures and decorative art from the Crystal Palace Exhibition and the collections from the Museum of Ornamental Art, previously held in Marlborough House. In 1899 Queen Victoria laid the foundation stone for the current building, designed by Sir Aston Webb, and christened the official change of name to the Victoria & Albert Museum.

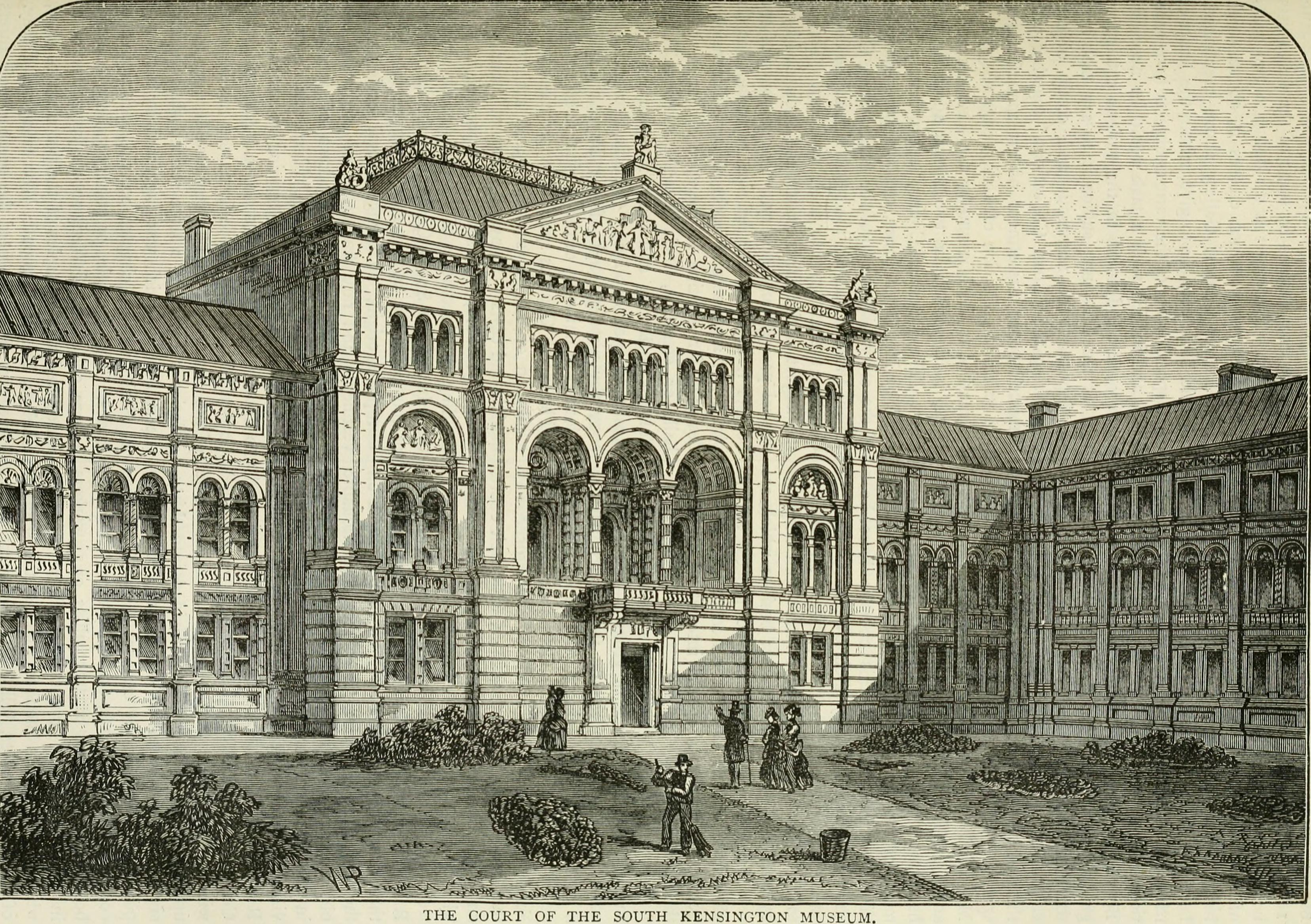
The South Kensington Museum in 1873

The rest of the land belonging to 'Albertopolis', on the site currently occupied by the Natural History and Science Museums, was used to host the 1862 International Exhibition. A substantial portion was given over to the headquarters and gardens of the Royal Horticultural Society, which was based on the site of the modern Science Museum between 1861 and 1888. The exhibition buildings were afterwards repurposed to hold the scientific objects from the South Kensington Museum, a collection which gradually expanded through acquisitions of scientific instruments in 1874, as well as acquisitions of patent models and machinery like the original cotton mills from Arkwright Mill. By 1893 the first director was appointed to oversee these developing science collections, which would become the core of the Science Museum upon its founding as a separate entity in 1909. In the meantime, the decision was made to relocate the natural history specimen collections of the British Museum to a separate and dedicated facility, the Natural History Museum, the building of which lasted between 1873 and 1884. Other enterprises were granted parcels of land on the active patronage of the commission, which aimed to fulfill Prince Albert's vision. By the end of the century the museums were complemented by the Royal Albert Hall (opened in 1871), the Royal College of Music (opened 1894), and the Imperial Institute (opened 1893).

=== Theatre ===
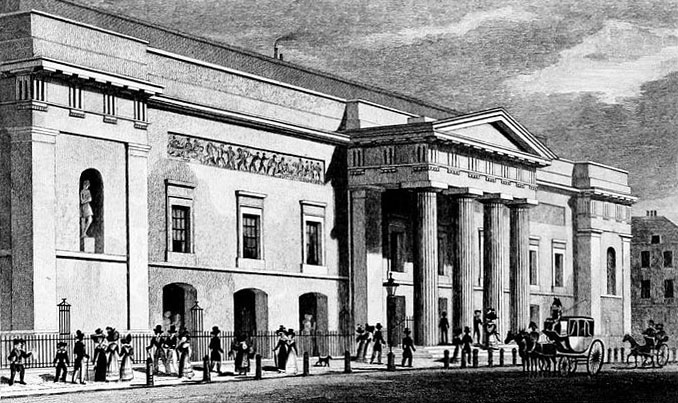
The Covent Garden Theatre in 1827–28, when it was one of only two licensed theatres in London

In addition to the museums, popular entertainment proliferated throughout the city. At the beginning of the century, there were only three theatres in operation in London: the "winter" theatres of the Theatre Royal, Drury Lane and the Theatre Royal, Covent Garden, and the "summer" theatre of Haymarket. The duopoly granting exclusive rights to the "winter theatres", dating back to the 17th century, forbade rival theatres from operating despite the huge growth in London's population and in theatre attendance. A loosening of these restrictions in the early years of the 19th century allowed small theatres to open which could only put on plays interspersed with musical numbers. To skirt the strict regulations, theatres like the Old Vic were established outside the boundaries of London to produce new plays. In 1843, Parliament repealed the Licensing Act 1737, ending the duopoly of the Drury Lane and Covent Garden theatres, while the Theatres Act 1843 allowed straight plays to be produced in all licensed theatres. Aided by the promotion of theatre as a respectable medium, and new technologies which made staging plays more sophisticated, 19 theatres were in operation by 1851. By 1899 there were 61 theatres across London, 38 of which were in the West End.

The music hall was a form of live entertainment which developed gradually during the first half of the 19th century. By the 1830s many hybrid pub/performance venues, known as "Free and Easies", existed where customers could enjoy live entertainment from amateur singers. These were disreputable establishments, which led some public houses to offer Song and supper rooms as a respectable middle-class alternative. Song and Supper Rooms of the 1830s and 40s offered patrons, for a surcharge, the opportunity to dine and drink while enjoying live musical acts of a higher caliber than the "Free and Easies". The 700-person capacity Canterbury Music Hall, which opened in 1852 in Lambeth, was the first purpose-built music hall, establishing the model with its large auditorium packed with tables for dining, generally offering bawdy musical revues or individual acts. By 1875 there were 375 music halls across the city, with the greatest number concentrated in the East End (around 150 had been established in Tower Hamlets by midcentury). Music halls became an integral part of cockney popular culture, with performers like George Robey and George Leybourne famous for their comic characters and songs. Two of the largest and most famous music halls were in Leicester Square – the Alhambra and the Empire – both of which were also notorious for the prostitutes who plied their trade in the galleries.

== Government ==
In 1829, Home Secretary Robert Peel established the Metropolitan Police as a police force covering the entire urban area, with the exception of the City of London, which formed its own police force under a separate jurisdiction in 1839. In 1839, the two small forces which pre-dated the Met – the Bow Street Runners and the Marine Police Force – were absorbed into it once and for all. The force gained the nicknames of "bobbies" or "peelers" named after Robert Peel, and initially numbered 1,000 officers. Corruption was rife among this early batch of recruits, so much so that five-sixths of the original force had been dismissed within four years.

London's urban area grew rapidly, spreading into Islington, Paddington, Belgravia, Holborn, Finsbury, Shoreditch, Southwark and Lambeth. With London's rapid growth, towards the middle of the century, an urgent need arose to reform London's system of local government.

Outside of the City of London, which resisted any attempts to expand its boundaries to encompass the wider urban area, London had a chaotic local government system consisting of ancient parishes and vestries, working alongside an array of single-purpose boards and authorities, few of which co-operated with each other. Drainage in the city was handled by seven different commissions of sewers, and in a 100 square yard area of Central London were four different bodies responsible for the pavement and upkeep of the streets. In 1855 the Metropolitan Board of Works (MBW) was created to provide London with adequate infrastructure to cope with its growth. The MBW was London's first metropolitan government body.

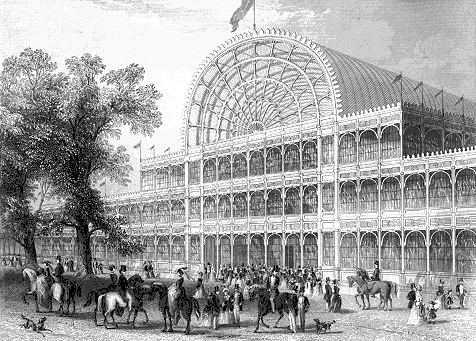
The Crystal Palace in 1851

The Metropolitan Board of Works was not a directly elected body, which made it unpopular with Londoners. In 1888, it was wound up and replaced with the London County Council (LCC). This was the first elected London-wide administrative body. The LCC covered the same area as the MBW had done, but this area was designated as the County of London. In 1900, the county was subdivided into 28 metropolitan boroughs, which formed a more local tier of administration than the county council.

Parliament also took a more proactive role in public health and healthcare during the latter part of the century. It passed the London-specific Metropolitan Poor Act 1867 (30 & 31 Vict. c. 6), creating the Metropolitan Asylums Board and six new Metropolitan Asylum Districts in London. The act was intended to move the provision of healthcare for the poor away from the workhouse infirmaries, whose conditions attracted much public scorn, and into six new hospitals. Only two of these, in Central London and the Poplar and Stepney District, were fully realized, with the other four districts using reconstituted facilities from the old infirmaries because of cost overruns.

=== Sanitation ===
One of the first tasks of the Metropolitan Board of Works was to address London's sanitation problems. Sewers were far from extensive, and the most common form of human waste disposal was cesspools, some 200,000 by mid-century, which were often open and prone to overflowing. An 1847 ordinance of the Metropolitan Commission of Sewers requiring all waste to be discharged into sewers meant that the Thames, where all the discharge went, became much more polluted. The combination of cesspools and the raw sewage pumped into the city's main source of drinking water led to repeated outbreaks of cholera in 1832, 1849, 1854, and 1866 and culminated in The Great Stink of 1858. The 1866 cholera epidemic was the fourth in the city's history, but also the last and the least deadly. Further epidemics were forestalled by Bazalgette's improved sanitation system.

Following the Great Stink of 1858, Parliament finally gave consent for the MBW to construct a massive system of sewers. The engineer put in charge of building the new system was Joseph Bazalgette. In one of the largest civil engineering projects of the 19th century, he oversaw construction of over 1,300 miles (2,100 km) of tunnels and pipes under London to take away sewage and provide clean drinking water. When the London sewerage system was completed, the death toll in London dropped dramatically, and epidemics were curtailed. Bazalgette's system is still in use today.

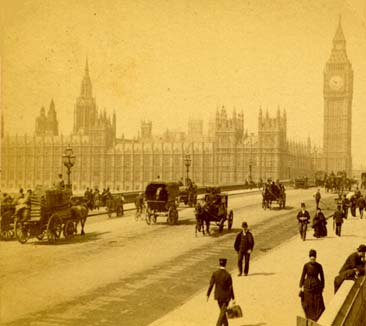
The Houses of Parliament from old Westminster Bridge in the early 1890s

While the problems of disposal of sewage and human waste were much improved by the late 19th century, there also remained problems of sanitation on the streets of London. With some 300,000 horses in use in the city by the 1890s, 1,000 tons of dung were being dropped on London's streets each day. Boys between 12 and 14 were employed to collect horse waste from the streets, which remained the main method until cars gradually replaced horse-drawn vehicles in the 20th century.

The social reformer Edwin Chadwick condemned the methods of waste removal in British cities, including London, in his 1842 Report on The Sanitary Condition of the Labouring Population of Great Britain. In the poorer areas of London, rotting food, excrement and mud accumulated on the streets, where drains were few and far between and there were no supplies of water to flush them clean. Chadwick attributed the spread of disease to this filth, advocating improved water supplies and drains, and criticising the inefficient system of labourers and street sweepers then employed to maintain cleanliness. The result was the passing of the Public Health Act 1848 (11 & 12 Vict. c. 63), which placed the responsibility for street cleansing, paving, sewers, and water supply on the municipal boroughs rather than on property owners. The boroughs had the power to create boards of health, charged with initiating the reforms, and also empowered to intervene and remove a broad range of "nuisances" to public health.

The weakness of the Public Health Act 1848 was that it did not compel the boroughs to act but merely provided the framework for doing so. More comprehensive and forceful legislation was passed by Parliament with the Public Health Act 1872 and Public Health Act 1875. The last act compelled the boroughs to provide adequate drainage, required all new housing to be built with running water, and required all streets to be equipped with lighting and pavements. The boards of health were replaced by urban sanitary authorities overseeing new urban sanitary districts. These authorities were more comprehensive than their predecessors, equipped with teams of medical officers and health inspectors who ensured food safety standards were met and actively prevented outbreaks of disease.

== Pollution ==
=== Fog ===
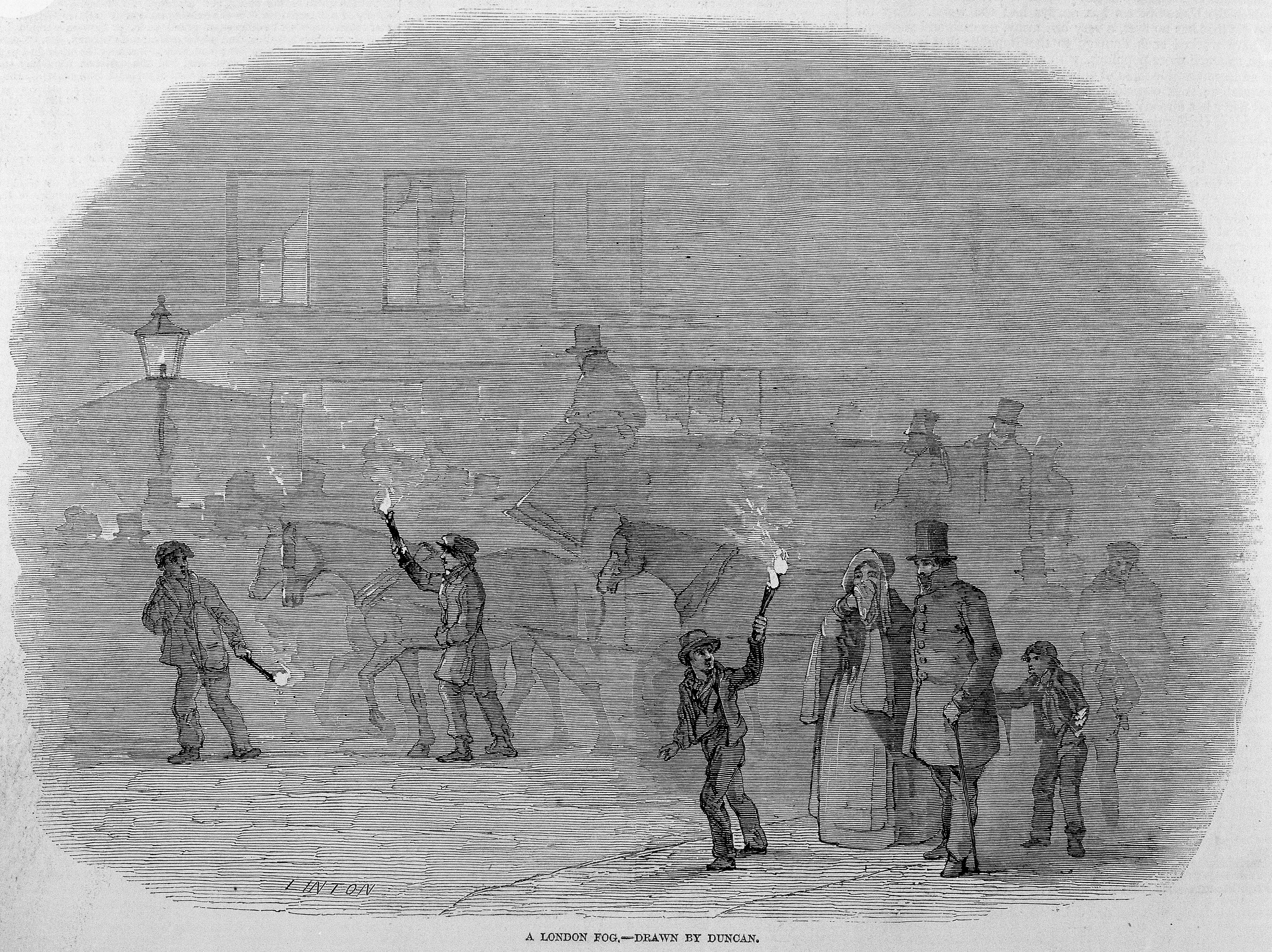
"A London Fog", from The Illustrated London News (1847)

Atmospheric pollution caused by burning cheap soft coal created the city's notorious pea soup fog. Air pollution from burning wood or coal was nothing new to London – complaints about the city's dirty atmosphere exist as far back as the 13th century – but the population explosion and industrialisation of the 19th century aggravated both the severity of the fogs and their lethal effects on Londoners.

The fogs were at their worst in the month of November, but occurred frequently throughout the autumn and winter. Sulphur dioxide and soot emitted from chimneys mixed with the natural vapour of the Thames Valley to form a layer of greasy, acrid mist that shrouded the city up to 240 feet (75 metres) above street level. Its most common colour was a greenish-yellow "pea soup", but it could also be brown, black, orange, or grey. At their worst, the poor visibility caused by London fogs could halt traffic and required the street lamps to be lit all day. Conditions for pedestrians were extremely dangerous: in 1873, nineteen deaths were attributed to accidental drowning from victims who fell into the Thames, canals, or docks during foggy weather. There were also increases in crimes like theft, rape, and assault on London streets because of the cover provided by the fog. Charles Dickens Jr. described the "London particular" in his Dictionary of London of 1879:

As the east wind brings up the exhalations of the Essex and Kentish marshes, and as the damp-laden winter air prevents the dispersion of the partly consumed carbon from hundreds of thousands of chimneys, the strangest atmospheric compound known to science fills the valley of the Thames. At such times almost all the senses have their share of trouble. Not only does a strange and worse than Cimmerian darkness hide familiar landmarks from the sight, but the taste and sense of smell are offended by an unhallowed compound of flavours, and all things become greasy and clammy to the touch. During the continuance of a real London fog—which may be black, or grey, or more probably orange-coloured—the happiest man is he who can stay at home...Nothing could be more deleterious to the lungs and the air-passages than the wholesale inhalation of the foul air and floating carbon which, combined, form a London fog."

There was wide awareness of the deleterious health effects of extended fogs in London, particularly upon those suffering from respiratory illnesses. Mortality rates could rise well above average at times of severe fog: 700 extra deaths, for example, were attributed to a particularly bad fog in 1873. The recurrent fogs of January and February 1880 were especially bad, killing an estimated 2,000 people and raising the death rate to 48.1 per 1,000 people, compared to the average of 26.3 per thousand in other English cities.

=== Smoke ===
Pollution and a smoky atmosphere prevailed at all times of year because of industrial activity and the sheer concentration of domestic fires: an estimated 3.5 million tons of coal were being consumed each year in London by 1854. By 1880 coal consumption stood at 10 million tons per year. "The Smoke", or "The Big Smoke", a nickname for London which persists into the modern day, originated during the Victorian period among country dwellers visiting the capital. One observer described it in 1850:

"Soon after daybreak, the great factory shafts beside the river begin to discharge immense volumes of smoke; their clouds soon become confluent; the sky is overcast with a dingy veil; the house-chimneys presently add their contributions; and by ten o’clock, as one approaches London from any hill in the suburbs, one may observe the total result of this gigantic nuisance hanging over the City like a pall."

The smoky atmosphere meant that skin and clothing were quickly dirtied just by walking on the street. Household upholsteries, artwork, and furniture could become irretrievably dirtied, requiring large contingents of servants in the more prosperous households to maintain cleanliness. The preoccupation with the exorbitant laundry bills which resulted from the smoke was a main factor in legislating to control smoke emissions in London through the Smoke Nuisance Abatement (Metropolis) Act 1853. In the debates surrounding the passage of this act, it was estimated that a working class mechanic in London paid five times the cost of purchasing his shirt to launder it.

The grass of the Royal Parks took on a permanent soot colour, as did the sheep that were then allowed to graze in Regent's Park and Hyde Park. It was observed that certain varieties of flower refused to bloom in London or its vicinity, and many trees perished due to pollution. One of the trees that was resistant to the smoky environment was the London plane, which sheds its bark regularly and thus resisted the accumulation of soot which killed other trees. It became the go-to planting along streets and in gardens throughout the 19th century. Porous brick and stone were quickly blackened with soot, an effect worsened during bad fogs and damp weather, creating a "uniform dinginess" among London's buildings. The acidic nature of soot deposits caused materials like iron and bronze to oxidise faster, while stone, mortar, and brick deteriorated at a noticeably faster rate. In response, terra cotta and other kiln-fired tiles became popular facings for buildings in the 1880s and 1890s, because they resisted soot and damp and also provided welcome colour to buildings that were otherwise drab.

Concerns over smoke pollution gave rise to private smoke abatement societies in London and throughout Britain, which championed different measures for controlling smoke pollution. One of these measures was smoke-prevention technology – an exhibition of such devices was staged in London over an 11-week period by the Smoke Abatement Committee in 1881. The exhibition attracted 116,000 attendants and displayed all manner of smokeless furnaces, stoves, grates, and alternative industrial equipment. While the passage of the Smoke Nuisance Abatement (Metropolis) Act 1853 placed restrictions on industrial smoke emissions, an attempt in 1884 to legislate against domestic smoke pollution failed, leaving a significant contributor to the problem unregulated.

== Famous buildings and landmarks ==
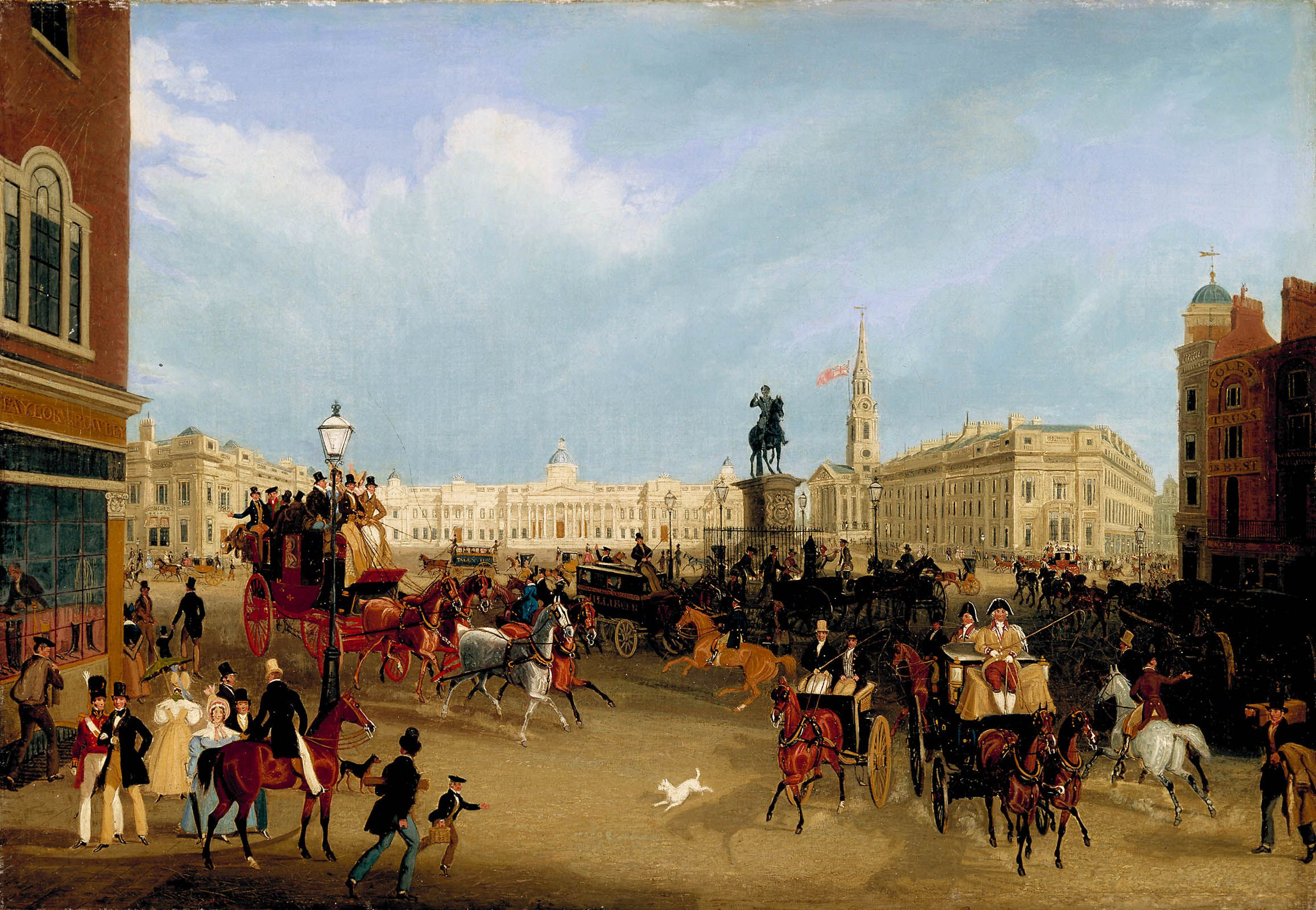
A painting by James Pollard showing the Trafalgar Square before the erection of Nelson's Column

Many famous buildings and landmarks of London were constructed during the 19th century, including:

- Buckingham Palace
- Trafalgar Square
- Nelson's Column
- Big Ben and the Houses of Parliament
- Royal Albert Hall
- Albert Memorial
- Tower Bridge
- Wellington Arch
- Marble Arch
- British Museum
- Natural History Museum
- National Gallery
- Victoria and Albert Museum
- Colonial Office

== See also ==
- Timeline of London (1800s)
- Victorian era
