= Tandem: A Tale of Shadows =

2021 video game

- Developer: Monochrome Paris
- Publisher: Hatinh Interactive
- Platforms: Nintendo Switch; PlayStation 4 Windows; Xbox One; Xbox Series X/S
- Release: October 21, 2021; 4 years ago
- Genre: Puzzle platformer
- Mode: Single-player

Tandem: A Tale of Shadows is a 2021 puzzle platformer video game developed by Monochrome Paris and published by Hatinh Interactive for Nintendo Switch, PlayStation 4, Windows, Xbox One, and Xbox Series X/S. The game follows the story of a 10-year old girl named Emma and a mysterious teddy bear named Fenton, as they embark on a journey to solve the mystery of the disappearance of Thomas Kane, the son of a famous magician.

== Gameplay ==
Tandem: A Tale of Shadows is a puzzle platformer where the gameplay involves alternating between the two characters, Emma and Fenton. Emma explores the rooms and hallways via the floor, while Fenton defies gravity and walks on the walls. Utilising a 3D environment, The game is set in an eerie trap-laden steampunk mansion spread across 40 levels. Each level presents a series of puzzles that the player must solve using the abilities of both the characters. The game also includes various enemies and bosses that the player must overcome.

The game uses an art style that combines Victorian aesthetics with dark and whimsical elements.

== Plot ==
Set in the 19th century, the plot revolves around the mysterious disappearance of Thomas Kane, the son of a famous illusionist couple. The game follows the journey of a ten-year old girl named Emma who is fascinated by the Kanes and takes it upon herself to investigate Thomas Kane's disappearance.

On her way, Emma encounters a living, breathing but entirely mute teddy bear named Fenton, who is flung from a horse carriage on the streets of Victorian era London. Fenton chases the carriage all the way to the ominously gated mansion of the Kanes, with Emma trailing closely behind.

Once inside the mansion, Emma and Fenton work together to explore and survive the many dangerous items and creatures.

== Development and release ==
Tandem: A Tale of Shadows was developed by MonochromeParis and published by Hatinh Interactive. The game was released on October 20, 2021. The game was developed using Unreal Engine 4.

== Reception ==
Reception

Aggregate scores
| Aggregator | Score |
|---|---|
| Metacritic | 73/100 |
| OpenCritic | 76/100 |

Review scores
| Publication | Score |
|---|---|
| Adventure Gamers | 3.5/5 |
| Jeuxvideo.com | 18/20 |
| NME | 3/5 |
| PlayStation: The Official Magazine | 3.5/5 |

Tandem: A Tale of Shadows received favourable reviews. While the game was praised for its unique and creative gameplay and art style, it was criticised for the short length and lack of narrative.

Christopher Byrd of the Washington Post felt that Tandem's narrative was somewhat lacking, writing that "its hasty early cinematics don't do it any favors, but its exquisitely structured puzzle-platforming levels render them beside the point. ... The setup of the game feels rushed, providing only a bare-bones introduction to the characters and their motivations. Yet as soon as control of Emma and Fenton is passed to the player, the game finds its footing."

Vitor Alexandre of Eurogamer wrote in his review, "For a game produced by a studio made up of five people specialized in 3D design, Monochrome Paris, it cannot be said that it falls short of expectations. Tandem: A Tale of Shadows integrates those laborious puzzle and action games, combining two- and three-dimensional perspectives. It is a careful production, somewhat meticulous in the visual definition, especially in the crossing of perspectives as a form of resolution, sometimes through a top down 3D perspective, sometimes in a side scroll format."

In the review for Famitsu, Kazuya Teramura called the game highly addictive, such that "once you start, you lose track of time because you are worried about the continuation."

Scott Baird from Screen Rant called the game an excellent, creepy puzzle game, adding, "Tandem: A Tale of Shadows is a short game, but each stage is well-crafted, with the puzzles being just difficult enough to make the player feel smart for solving them, while never being so obtuse that they become frustrating. The creepy world of toys and monsters in the Kane Manor is a lot of fun to explore, and learning how to change the shape of shadows to the player's need stays intriguing until the end."

PC Invasion said that "Tandem: A Tale of Two Shadows is a solid puzzle title based on a well-executed premise. The game never overstays its welcome, with about four hours of playtime. The bottom line here is it's a cheap game with well-executed ideas. But is Tandem the game that adds a truly unique perspective to the puzzle game genre, like It Takes Two for example? Unfortunately, my answer would be no. Tandem is a solid game, but it isn't a puzzle revolution. It is what it is: a simple, solid, affordable good time."
