= Dirt =

Matter considered unclean

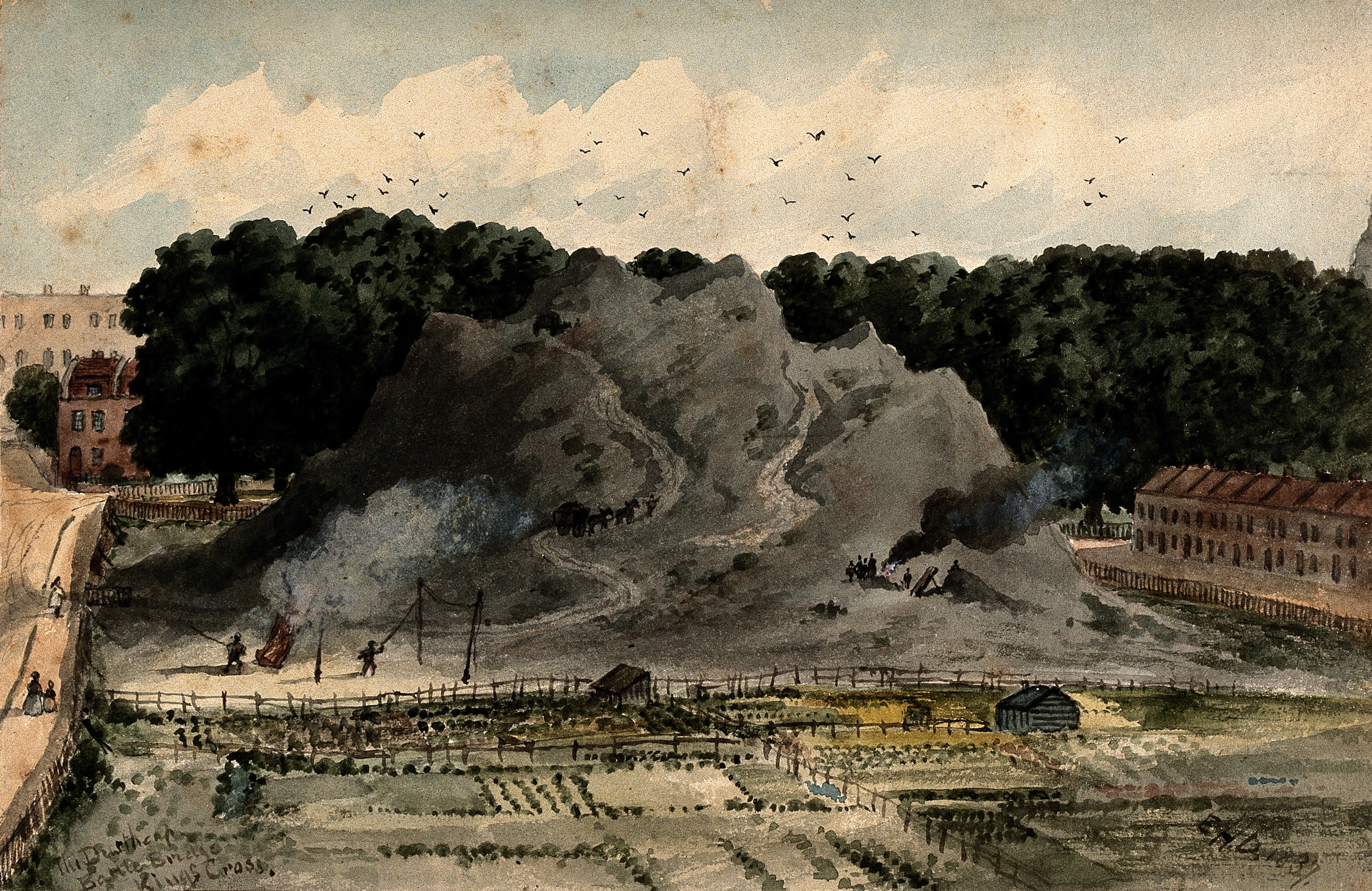
The great dust heap of London at Battle Bridge in 1836, next to the Smallpox Hospital

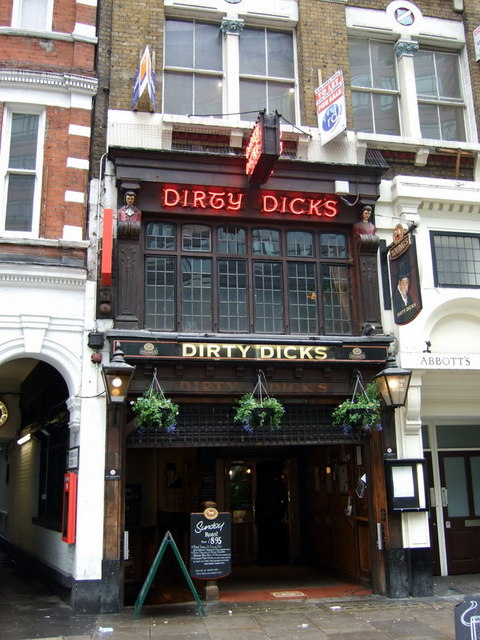
Dirty Dicks is a Bishopsgate pub named after Dirty Dick, who once owned it and was notoriously filthy.

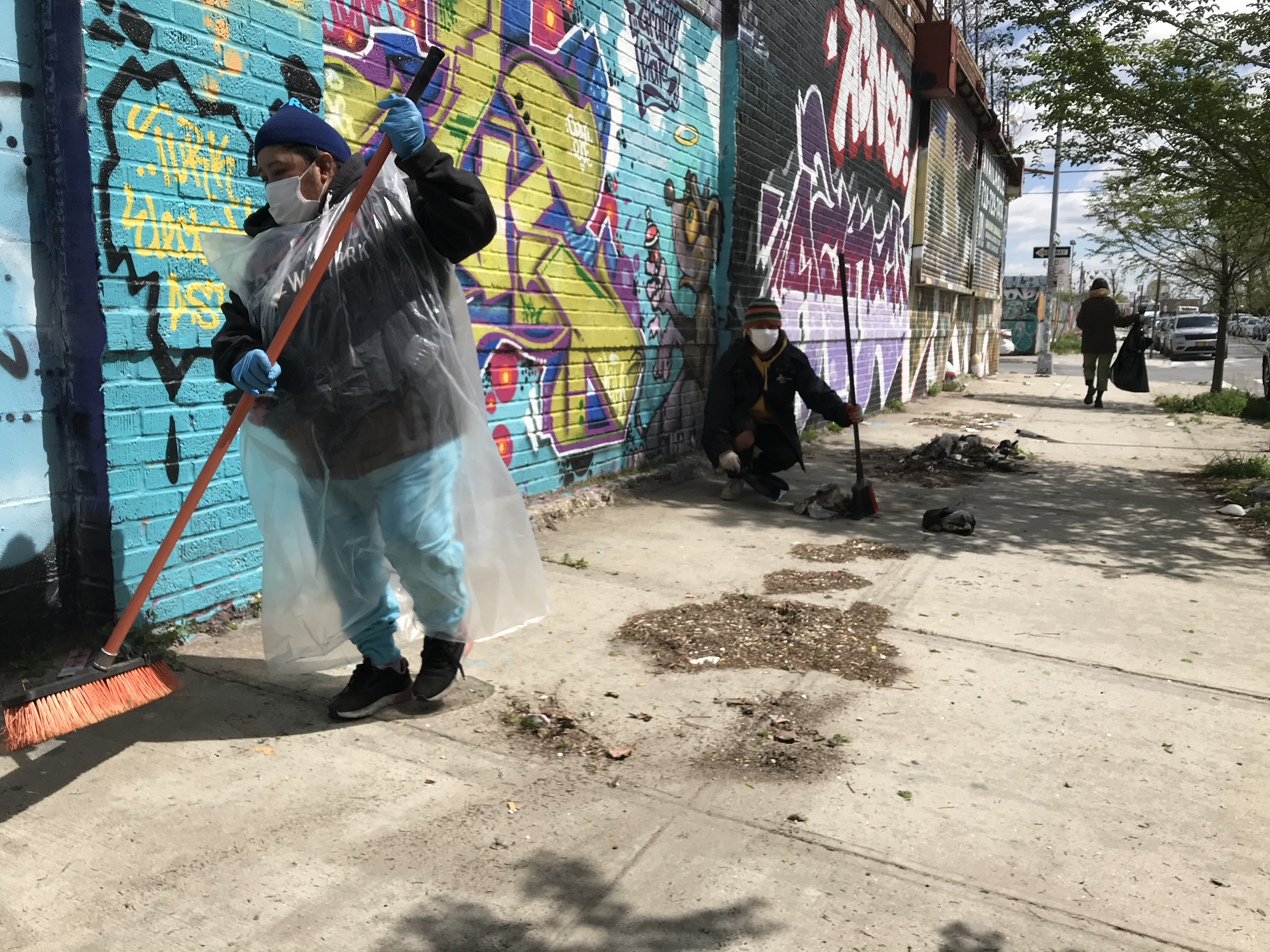
Dirt-covered sidewalk in Brooklyn, NYC being swept during a community clean-up

Dirt is any matter considered unclean, especially when in contact with a person's clothes, skin, or possessions. In such cases, they are said to become dirty. Common types of dirt include:

- Debris: scattered pieces of waste or remains
- Dust: a general powder of organic or mineral matter
- Filth: foul matter such as excrement
- Grime: a black, ingrained dust such as soot
- Soil: the mix of clay, sand, and humus which lies on top of bedrock. The term 'soil' may be used to refer to unwanted substances or dirt that are deposited onto surfaces such as clothing.

== Etymology ==
The word dirt first appears in Middle English and was probably borrowed from the Old Norse drit, meaning 'excrement'.

== Exhibitions and studies ==
A season of artworks and exhibits on the theme of dirt was sponsored by the Wellcome Trust in 2011. The centrepiece was an exhibition at the Wellcome Collection showing pictures and histories of notable dirt such as the great dust heaps at Euston and King's Cross in the 19th century and the Fresh Kills landfill which was once the world's largest landfill.

== Cleaning ==
When things are dirty, they are usually cleaned with solutions like hard surface cleaner and other chemical solutions; much domestic activity is for this purpose—washing, sweeping, and so forth.

In a commercial setting, a dirty appearance gives a bad impression. An example of such a place is a restaurant. The dirt in such cases may be classified as temporary, permanent, and deliberate. Temporary dirt is streaks and detritus that may be removed by ordinary daily cleaning. Permanent dirt is ingrained stains or physical damage to an object, which requires major renovation to remove. Deliberate dirt is that which results from design decisions such as decor in dirty orange or grunge styling.

== Disposal ==
As cities developed, arrangements were made for the disposal of trash through the use of waste management services. In the United Kingdom, the Public Health Act 1875 required households to place their refuse into a container that could be moved so that it could be carted away. This was the first legal creation of the dustbin.

== Health ==
Modern society is now thought to be more hygienic. Lack of contact with microorganisms in dirt when growing up is hypothesised to be the cause of the epidemic of allergies such as asthma. The human immune system requires activation and exercise in order to function properly and exposure to dirt may achieve this. For example, the presence of staphylococcus bacteria on the surface of the skin regulates the inflammation which results from injury.

Even when no visible dirt is present, contamination by microorganisms, especially pathogens, can still cause an object or location to be considered dirty. For example, computer keyboards are especially dirty as they contain on average 70 times more microbes than a lavatory seat.

People and animals may eat dirt. This is thought to be caused by mineral deficiency and so the condition is commonly seen in pregnant women.

== Neurosis ==
People may become obsessed by dirt and engage in fantasies and compulsive behaviour about it, such as making and consuming mud pies and pastries. The source of such thinking may be genetic, as the emotion of disgust is common and the location for this activity in the brain has been proposed.

== See also ==
- Cleaner
