= Limehouse Causeway =

Street in east London that was the home to the original Chinatown of London

Coordinates: 51°30′28″N 0°1′43″E

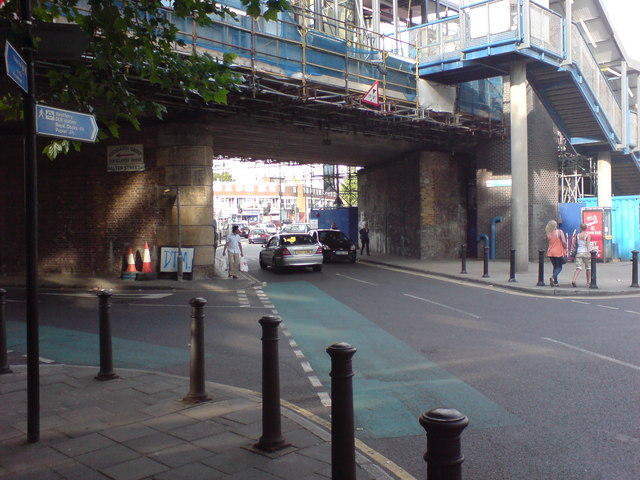
Railway bridge over Limehouse Causeway

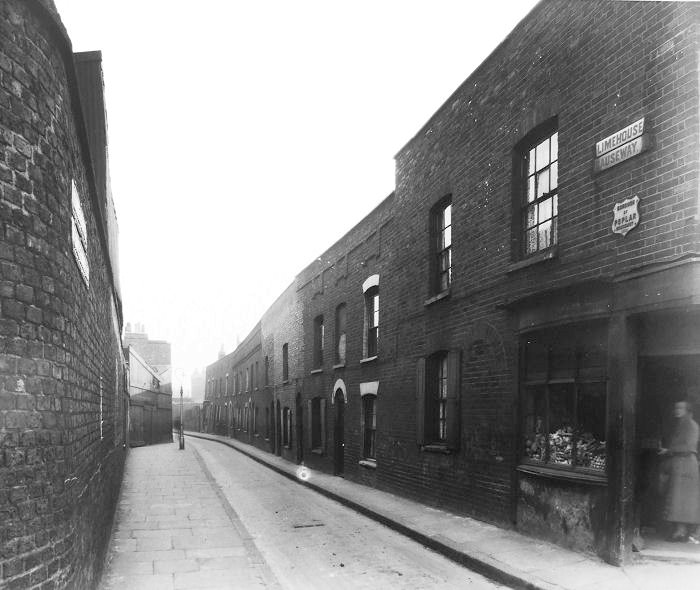
Part of Limehouse Causeway in 1936.

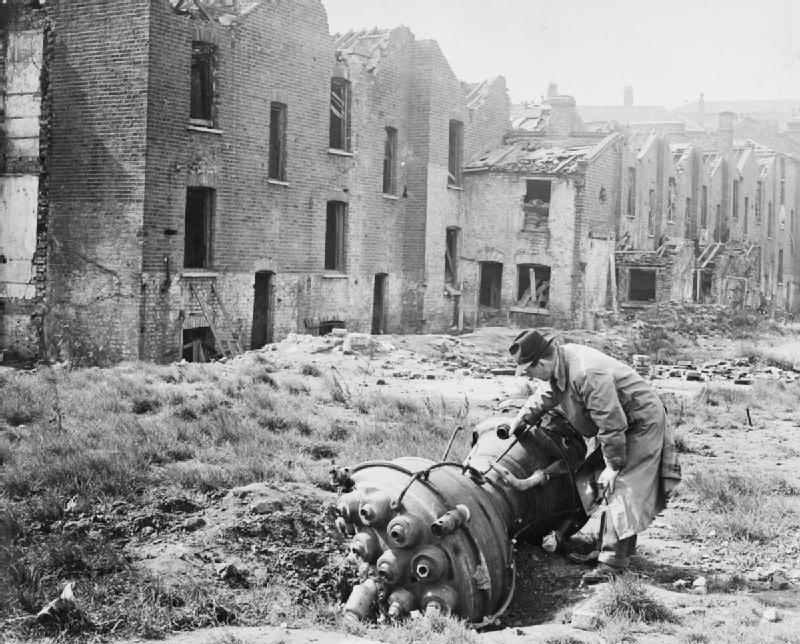
A V2 rocket motor at Limehouse after a German attack during World War II.

Limehouse Causeway is a street in the London Borough of Tower Hamlets, East London that was home to the original Chinatown of London. Bomb damage during the Second World War and later redevelopment resulted in removal of nearly all the original buildings of the street.

== Location ==
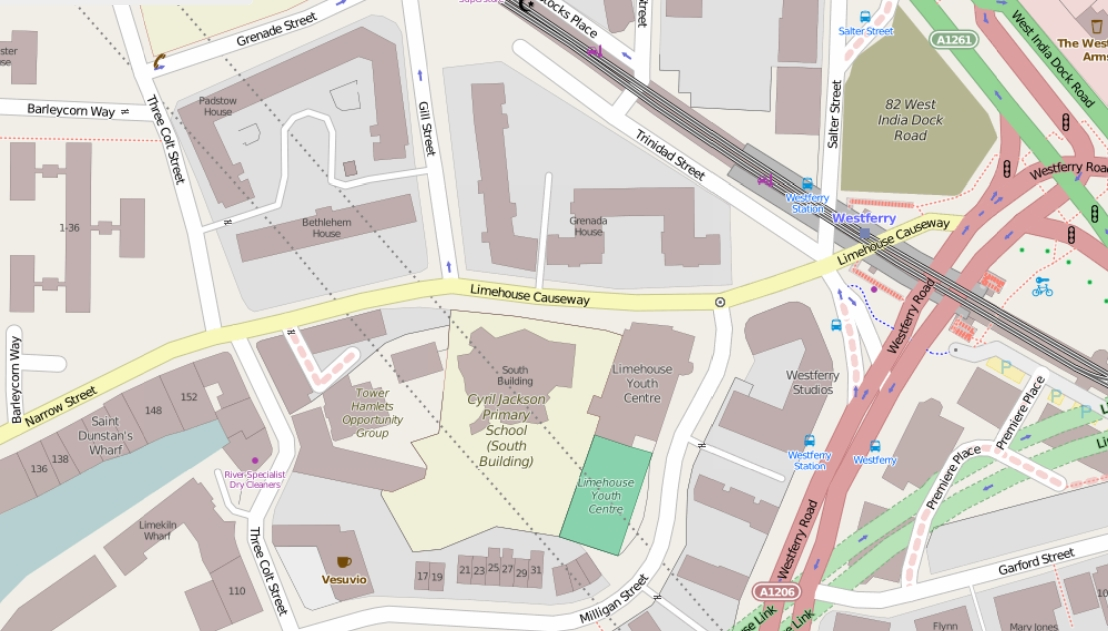
The immediate vicinity of Limehouse Causeway.

Limehouse Causeway runs from the junction of Narrow Street and Three Colt Street in the west to Westferry Road in the east. On its north side, it is joined by Gill Street and Salter Street. On the south side, it is joined by Milligan Street.

== Original "Chinatown" ==
The street was the home of the original "Chinatown" of London.

== Buildings ==
Most of the buildings on the street are publicly owned housing, built during the first phase of redevelopment after bomb damage was cleared in the 1960s and 1970s. In addition, there is the Cyril Jackson Primary School, the Limehouse Youth Centre, and some commercial buildings. The Westferry Docklands Light Railway station is located on the street.

== See also ==
- History of Chinese immigration to the United Kingdom
