= London Smallpox Hospital =

Former hospital in London

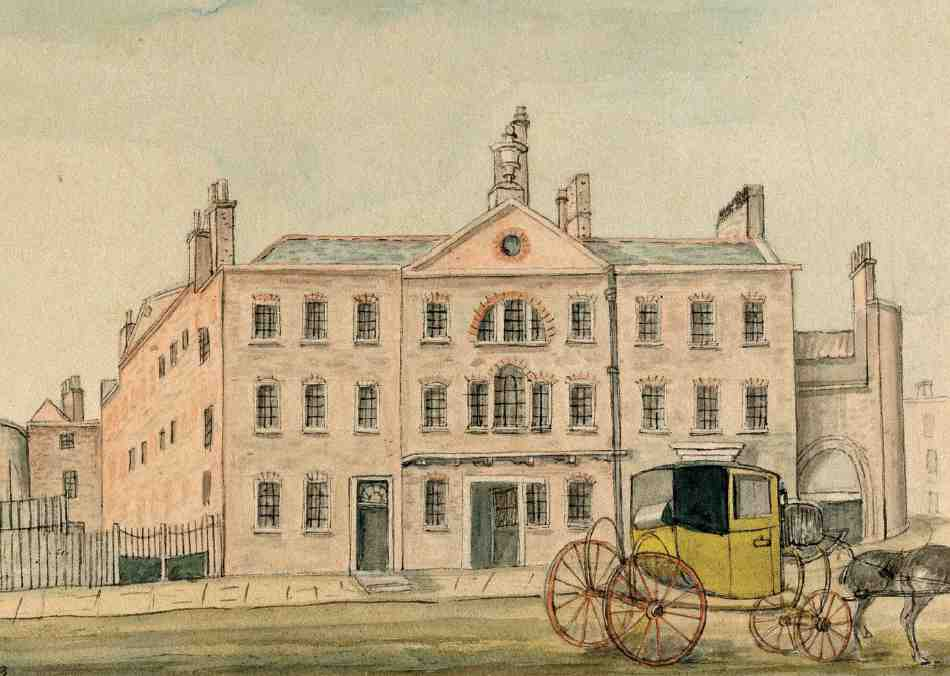
The former London Smallpox Hospital, Coldbath Fields, south elevation, 1823.

The London Smallpox Hospital, sometimes known as the Middlesex County Hospital for Smallpox and Inoculation, was established in 1745–6 and was said to be the first establishment of its type in Europe. The earliest buildings were in the West End of London, Finsbury and Bethnal Green, but in 1752 it moved to the house formerly occupied by Sir John Oldcastle in Coldbath Fields, admitting patients from 1753.

A new hospital in St Pancras was opened in 1793–4 and the Coldbath Fields building demolished in the 1860s. The Hospital in Saint Pancras near Battle Bridge, was demolished to make way for St Pancras railway station. The Hospital was replaced by the Highgate Smallpox and Vaccination Hospital, erected in 1848–1850.

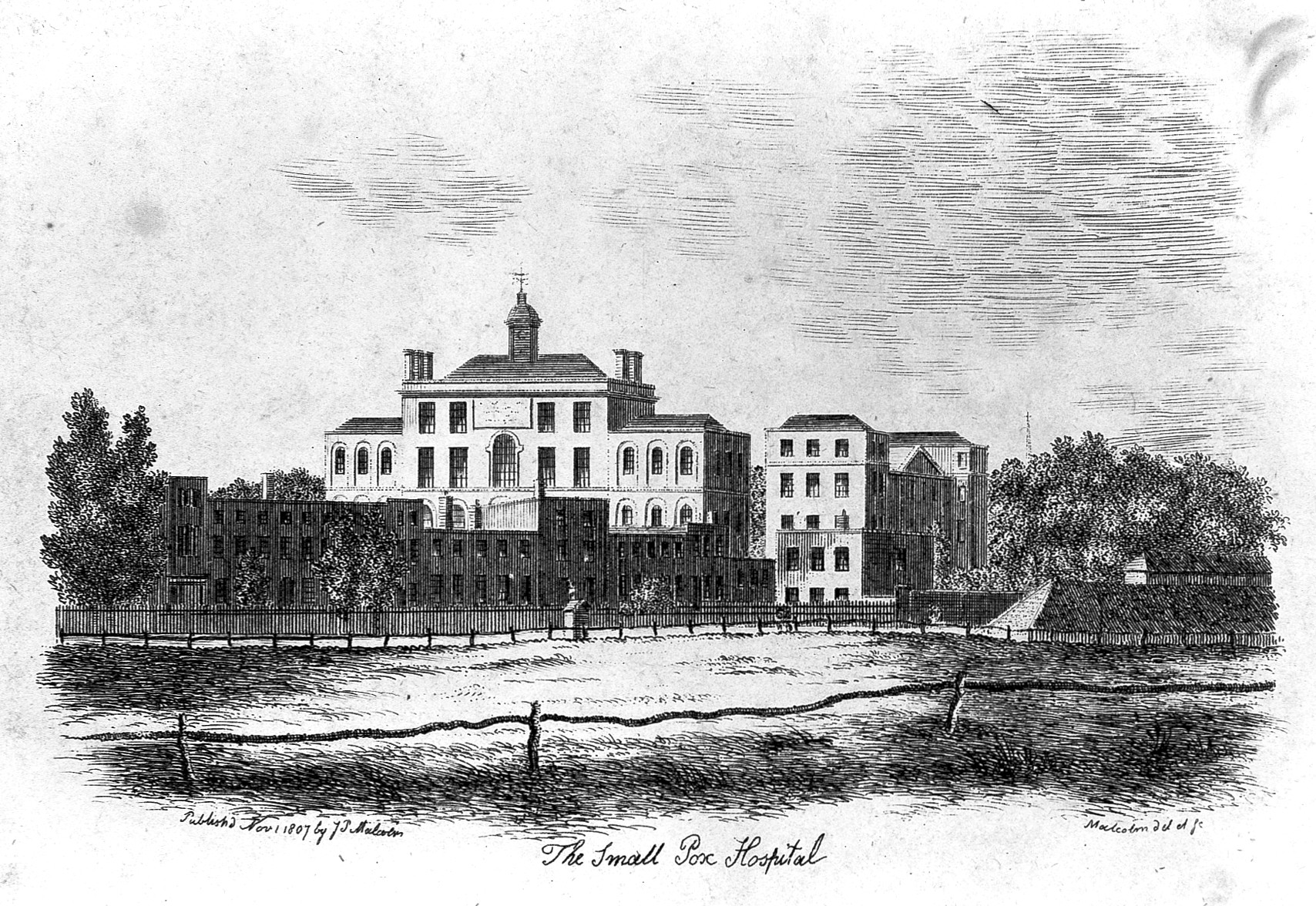
The former London Smallpox Hospital, St. Pancras situated near Battle Bridge in 1807
