= 1870 in the United Kingdom =

Events from the year 1870 in the United Kingdom.

== Incumbents ==
- Monarch – Victoria
- Prime Minister – William Ewart Gladstone (Liberal)

== Events ==
- 28 January
  - General Post Office takes over business of private telegraph companies.
  - Inman Line's SS City of Boston departs Halifax, Nova Scotia, on a passage for Liverpool on which it will be lost with all 191 aboard.
- 5 March – first ever (unofficial) international football match, England v Scotland, takes place under the approval of the Football Association at The Oval, London.
- 10 May – Jem Mace wins the boxing championship of the world, defeating fellow Englishman Tom Allen at Kenner, near New Orleans.
- 19 May – the Home Government Association is established in Ireland by Isaac Butt to argue for devolution for Ireland and repeal of the Act of Union 1800.
- late Spring – Army Enlistment Act 1870 (33 & 34 Vict. c. 67) allows reduction in length of enlistment to the British Army as part of the Cardwell Reforms.
- 2 June – competitive examination for entry to the British civil service introduced.
- 8 June – the final splice to the first telegraph submarine cable to India is made off Porthcurno, Cornwall.
- 23 June – Keble College, Oxford, opens, the first new college of the University of Oxford in more than a century.
- 2 August – official opening of the Tower Subway beneath the River Thames in London, the world's first underground passenger "tube" railway. Although this lasts as a railway operation only until November, it demonstrates the technologically successful first use of the cylindrical wrought iron tunnelling shield devised by Peter W. Barlow and James Henry Greathead.
- 4 August – British Red Cross established as the British National Society for Aid to the Sick and Wounded in War by Lord Wantage.
- 9 August
  - Elementary Education Act 1870 (33 & 34 Vict. c. 75) drafted by William Edward Forster MP encourages elementary education by creating a system of secular school boards in England and Wales at whose schools attendance may be compulsory. Women are eligible to stand and vote for local school boards where created.
  - Married Women's Property Act 1870 grants wives the ability to retain any earnings as their own; and provides that in future they may inherit and retain property in their own right.
- 27 August – White Star's first ocean liner RMS Oceanic is launched by Harland and Wolff in Belfast.
- 7 September – masted turret ship HMS Captain capsizes off Cape Finisterre, less than 5 months after commissioning, due to design flaws, with the loss of 481 lives.
- 1 October – postcards and halfpenny postage stamps introduced by the Post Office.
- 19 October – SS Cambria (1869) is wrecked on Inishtrahull (Ireland) with the loss of 179 lives.
- Undated – the David Greig grocery chain begins with a store in London.

== Publications ==
- 1 January
  - Completion of the Ordnance Survey one-inch-to-the-mile "Old Series" maps of England.
  - The Northern Echo newspaper launched in Darlington.
- April–September – serialisation of Charles Dickens' novel The Mystery of Edwin Drood, only half complete due to his death on 9 June.
- Edward Jenkins' satire Ginx's Baby: his birth and other misfortunes.
- William Robinson's gardening book The Wild Garden.
- Dante Gabriel Rossetti's Poems, exhumed from Elizabeth Siddal's grave.

== Births ==
- 7 January – Gordon Hewart, 1st Viscount Hewart, English judge and politician, 7th Lord Chief Justice of England (died 1943)
- 25 January – Fred Spiksley, footballer (died 1948)
- 5 February – C. E. Brock, painter and illustrator (died 1938)
- 8 February – Millie Hylton, actress, dancer and male impersonator (died 1920)
- 12 February – Marie Lloyd, music-hall singer (died 1922)
- 4 March – Thomas Sturge Moore, poet, author and artist (died 1944)
- 17 March – Horace Donisthorpe, entomologist (died 1951)
- 9 May – Harry Vardon, golfer (died 1937)
- 27 May – Lionel Palairet, cricketer (died 1933)
- 4 August – Harry Lauder, Scottish entertainer (died 1950)
- 11 August – Tom Richardson, cricketer (died 1912)
- 12 August – Hubert Gough, general (died 1963)
- 22 August – Bertram Fletcher Robinson, journalist, editor and author (died 1907)
- 1 September – Leopold Wharton, English-born American film director (died 1927)
- 22 September – Charlotte Cooper, tennis player (died 1966)
- 21 October – Horace Hood, admiral (killed in action 1916)
- 22 October – Lord Alfred Douglas, minor Uranian poet best remembered as a lover of writer Oscar Wilde (died 1945)
- 30 October – Lawrence Grant, film actor (died 1952 in the United States)
- 18 November – P. Morley Horder, architect (died 1944)
- 18 December – Saki (H. H. Munro), short-story writer (killed in action 1916)
- Doncaster, racehorse (died 1892)

== Deaths ==
- 2 January – Ignatius Bonomi, architect and surveyor (born 1787)
- 9 January – Elizabeth Sackville-West, Countess De La Warr, peeress (born 1795)
- 20 January – Sir George Seymour, admiral of the fleet (born 1787)
- 25 January – Janet Taylor, mathematician and navigational instrument maker (born 1804)
- 30 March – William Hale, inventor (born 1797)
- 25 April – Daniel Maclise, historical painter (born 1806)
- 6 May – Sir James Young Simpson, physician and researcher (born 1811)
- 14 May – Thomas Dale, Anglican priest, Dean of Rochester (born 1797)
- 17 May – David Octavius Hill, Scottish painter and pioneer photographer (born 1802)
- 24 April – Louisa Stuart Costello, miniature-painter, poet, historical novelist and travel writer (born 1799)
- 9 June – Charles Dickens, novelist (born 1812)
- 27 June – George Villiers, 4th Earl of Clarendon, diplomat and statesman (born 1800)
- 12 September – Eleanora Atherton, philanthropist in Manchester (born 1782)
- 25 September – John Braithwaite, engineer, inventor of the first steam fire engine (born 1797)
- 6 October – James Giles, painter (born 1801)
- 11 October – Margaret Waters, serial killer, hanged (born 1835)
- 21 October – Charles George James Arbuthnot, general (born 1801)
- 8 December – Thomas Brassey, railway contractor (born 1805)
- 9 December – Patrick MacDowell, sculptor (born 1799)
- 28 December – Philip Hardwick, architect (born 1792)
