= Liverpool Hydraulic Power Company =

Liverpool Hydraulic Power Co
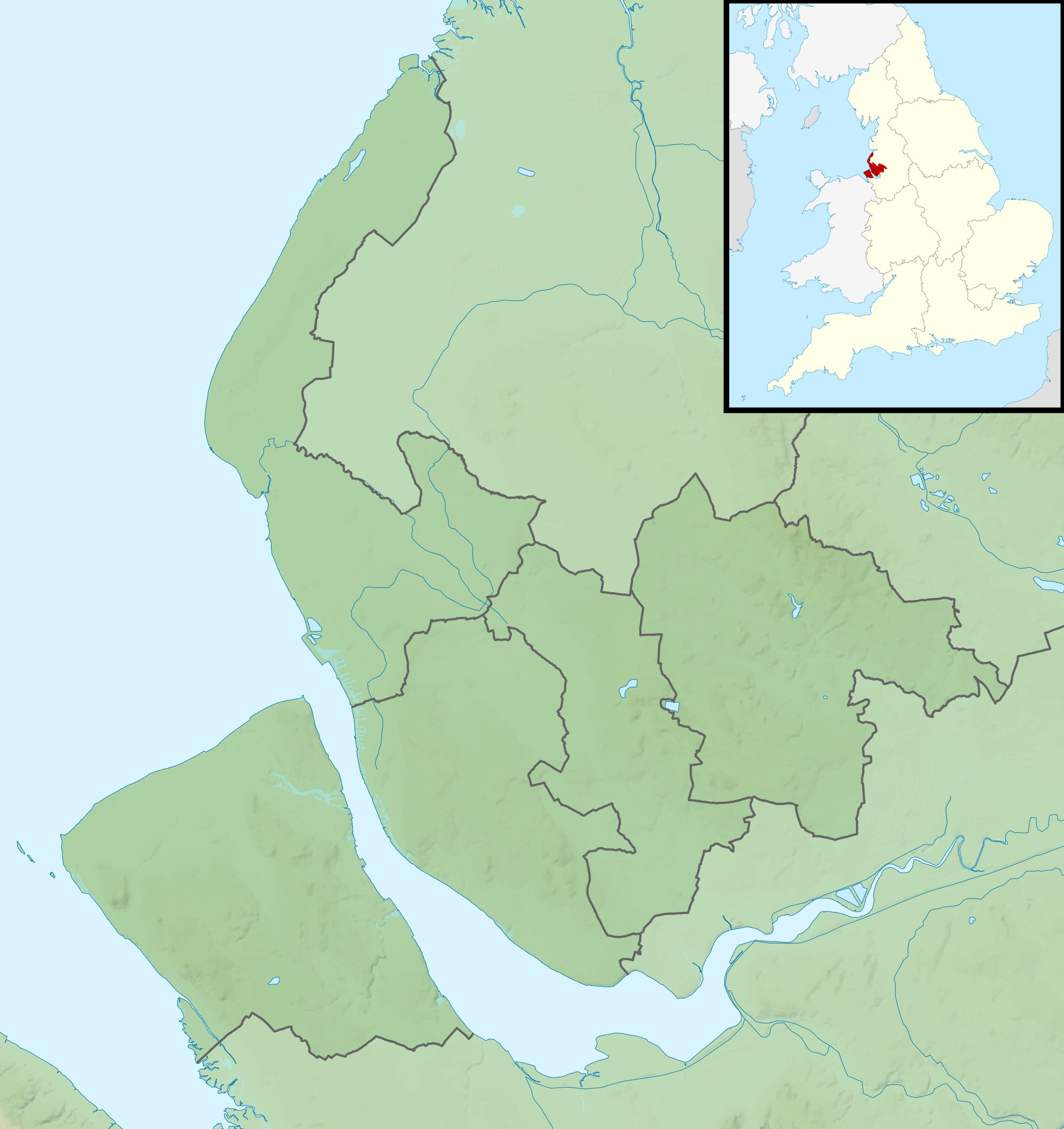
- Location within Merseyside
- Type: Hydraulic power network
- Location: Liverpool, England
- Coordinates: 53.4243°N 2.9899°W
- Opened: 1888
- Closed: 1971

Liverpool's Hydraulic Power Company were the operators of a public hydraulic power network supplying energy across the city of Liverpool, England, via a system of high-pressure water pipes from two pumping stations. The system was the third public system to be built in England, opening in 1888. It expanded rapidly, but gradually declined as electric power become more readily available. The pumping station was converted to electric operation in 1960, but the system was turned off in 1971. One of the pump sets was salvaged and presented to the Liverpool Museum.

== History ==
Liverpool Hydraulic Power Company's Act 1872
- Act of Parliament
- Parliament of the United Kingdom
- Long title: An Act for the Incorporation of the Liverpool Hydraulic Power Company, and for other purposes.
- Citation: 35 & 36 Vict. c. xvi

Dates
- Royal assent: 13 May 1872

Text of statute as originally enacted

Liverpool Hydraulic Power Act 1884
- Act of Parliament
- Parliament of the United Kingdom
- Long title: An Act for incorporating and conferring Powers upon the Liverpool Hydraulic Power Company and for other purposes.
- Citation: 47 & 48 Vict. c. cxxi

Dates
- Royal assent: 14 July 1884

Text of statute as originally enacted

Liverpool Hydraulic Power Act 1887
- Act of Parliament
- Parliament of the United Kingdom
- Long title: An Act for extending the district of the Liverpool Hydraulic Power Company and for other purposes.
- Citation: 50 & 51 Vict. c. xxxv

Dates
- Royal assent: 23 May 1887

Liverpool Hydraulic Power Act 1890
- Act of Parliament
- Parliament of the United Kingdom
- Long title: An Act for conferring further powers on the Liverpool Hydraulic Power Company and for other purposes.
- Citation: 53 & 54 Vict. c. lxiv

Dates
- Royal assent: 4 July 1890

Liverpool Hydraulic Power Act 1943
- Act of Parliament
- Parliament of the United Kingdom
- Long title: An Act to vary the powers of charge of the Liverpool Hydraulic Power Company to modify existing agreements and for other purposes.
- Citation: 6 & 7 Geo. 6. c. iii

Dates
- Royal assent: 22 April 1943

Text of statute as originally enacted

Liverpool Hydraulic Power Act 1957
- Act of Parliament
- Parliament of the United Kingdom
- Long title: An Act to authorise the Liverpool Hydraulic Power Company to construct new works to repeal the temporary limitation on the powers of charge of the company to repeal and modify existing agreements to empower the company and the London Hydraulic Power Company to borrow from and lend moneys to each other and for other purposes.
- Citation: 5 & 6 Eliz. 2. c. iv

Dates
- Royal assent: 17 April 1957

The Liverpool Hydraulic Power Company obtained the Liverpool Hydraulic Power Act 1884 (47 & 48 Vict. c. cxxi) and the Liverpool Hydraulic Power Act 1887 (50 & 51 Vict. c. xxxv), to allow it to construct a hydraulic power network under the streets of Liverpool. The system was operational by 1888, and was the third such undertaking in Britain, following the opening of the first system in Hull in 1877, and the second in London in 1883. At its inception, it supplied pressurised water at 700 pounds per square inch (48 bar) to its customers through around 18 miles (29 km) of 6-inch (15 cm) mains. The pumping station drew its water supply from the Leeds and Liverpool Canal, and was pumped into the system by steam engines with a total output of 800 horsepower (600 kW).

Demand for power grew, and by 1890 there were two power stations, one on Athol Street to the north, and the other on Grafton Street in the south of the city. Nine triple-expansion pumps could supply 432,000 imperial gallons (1.96 Ml) of water per day to the system, which now had 30 miles (48 km) of pipes, and by 1895 there were 453 hydraulic machines connected to the network. In addition to lifts, cranes and packing machines, the water also supplied hydrants and sprinklers which were used in case of fire.

The Institute of Mechanical Engineers made a visit to Liverpool in June 1891, to inspect various works, and details of the hydraulic power system were published in The Practical Engineer later that year. The pressure mains were made of cast iron, and the flanged joints were sealed with gutta-percha rings. Where possible, the pipes were laid in circuits, so that sections could be isolated for repairs or extensions, without interruption of the supply to others beyond the isolated section. The steam engines were supplied by the Hydraulic Power Company of Chester, run by Edward B. Ellington, the man behind the first British system at Hull. Steam for the first two pumping sets was supplied by three Lancashire boilers, which were fitted with mechanical stokers, operated by hydraulic power. Pressure in the system was maintained by two hydraulic accumulators, each having an 18-inch (46 cm) diameter piston with a stroke of 20 feet (6.1 m). The report wrongly quoted the operating pressure as 75 pounds per square inch (5.2 bar).

Under the terms of their acts of Parliament, the company had rights to lay mains beneath the streets in some parts of Liverpool, but in others they needed the consent of Liverpool Corporation. This consent was not always forthcoming, and there complaints in 1889 that the corporation were obstructing the expansion of the system to allow it to supply buildings owned by the Exchange Company, the Liverpool and London and Globe Insurance Company, the British and Foreign Marine Insurance Company, and the Prudential Assurance Company. All of them had water-powered lifts, which were fed from the corporation's own low-pressure mains. There were eight lifts in total, and over the course of a year, they used 24 million imperial gallons (110 Ml), for which they paid the corporation £700. If they had been connected to the high-pressure system, the volume of water used would only have been 1.6 million imperial gallons (7.3 Ml), which would have cost £340. The high-pressure lifts were also significantly faster. A lift in African Chambers on Old Hall Street, when carrying three people, took 38 seconds to rise 56 feet (17 m), but when converted to work from the high-pressure main, only took 15 seconds for the same journey. The volume of water used dropped by 94.3 per cent on the new system.

== Decline ==
Around 1960, the steam engines at Athol Street pumping station were replaced by electric pumps. There were three manufactured by Ward Lennox, which were capable of delivering 100 imperial gallons (0.45 m^{3}) per minute, and three made by the Leeds engineering firm of Hathorn Davey, which could supply 150 imperial gallons (0.68 m^{3}) per minute. The Hathorn Davey pumps had been installed at King's Cross railway station in 1924, and were obtained secondhand. The system continued in operation for only a few more years, and was shut down in 1971. One of the Hathorn Davey pumps and various other items of equipment were salvaged, and transferred to the Merseyside County Museum, now the Liverpool Museum. The records of the company are held in the reserve store of the museum.

== Points of interest ==
Point	Coordinates (Links to map resources)	OS Grid Ref	Notes
Athol Street Pumping Station	53.4243°N 2.9899°W	SJ343924	including main offices
Grafton Street Pumping Station	53.3843°N 2.9741°W	SJ353879	

== See also ==
- London Hydraulic Power Company
- Manchester Hydraulic Power

== Bibliography ==
- Graces Guide (1891). "The Practical Engineer, Volume V". Technical Publishing Company.
- McNeil, Ian (1972). Hydraulic Power. Longman Group. ISBN 978-0-582-12797-5.
- Pugh, B (1980). The Hydraulic Age: Public Power Supplies before Electricity. Mechanical Engineering Publications. ISBN 978-0-85298-447-5.
