= Ernest William Moir =

British civil engineer credited with inventing the first medical airlock

Sir Ernest William Moir in 1917

Sir Ernest William Moir (9 June 1862 – 14 June 1933) was a British civil engineer and the first Moir baronet. He is credited with inventing the first medical airlock while working on the Hudson River Tunnel in New York in 1889.

== Early life ==
The son of Alexander Mitchell Moir and of Scottish descent, he was born in London and was educated at University College School. At a young age he showed a great interest in mechanics and became expert in mechanical and engineering work while in college. Aged about 15, Moir joined the engineering works of Messrs. Robert Napier and Sons in Glasgow where he served an apprenticeship as a mechanical engineer. He studied engineering at University College London before joining the firm of William Arrol in Glasgow where he started in the drawing office. In his early career he also came into close contact with John Fowler, Benjamin Baker and John Wolfe Barry.

== Engineering projects ==
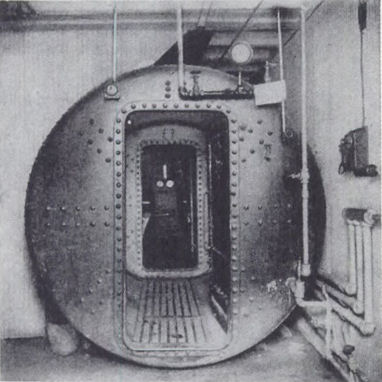
Moir's airlock of 1889 first used while building the Hudson River Tunnel in New York City

Moir was the assistant to James Henry Greathead (1844–96) on the building of the London (City) & Southwark Subway, later the City & South London Railway (and now part of the Northern line) in the late 1880s. He was also involved in the construction of the southern cantilevers of the Forth Bridge.

After British consulting engineering expertise was required at the Hudson River Tunnel in New York City, Sir Benjamin Baker provided a report which facilitated $1.5 million of British investment, and in 1889 construction resumed with a contract let to British contractor S. Pearson & Son; Moir was originally resident engineer working for Sir William Arrol and designed an 80-ton steel tunnelling shield for each tunnel at Baker's directions. Moir became contractor's agent (for S. Pearson & Son) in January 1890, working there until British engineering efforts were suspended in 1891. While in New York from May 1890 Moir invented an airlock chamber for treating decompression sickness when he noticed that about 25% of the workforce digging the Hudson River Tunnel were dying and was surprised to note that "nobody has seemed to care anything about it." He realised that the solution was recompression and his airlock was quickly applied throughout the industry. While Moir's treatment was effective it was too fast by modern standards but he began the process which would lead to the effective treatment of decompression sickness.

Upon his return to the UK from New York, Moir worked on other S. Pearson & Son projects including the Blackwall Tunnel (1892–1897), for which he designed the steel tunnelling shield and other plant, being praised by David Hay for his "originality, zeal, determination and genius" in carrying out the work. Later projects included expansion of the Surrey Commercial Docks and Seaham harbour, the Admiralty harbour at Dover (officially opened in 1909), and Valparaíso harbour in Chile.

He gained the rank of captain in the Royal Engineers (Volunteers) and was put on the Unattached List in 1908. Among his patents was one for a diving bell in 1921.

== War service ==
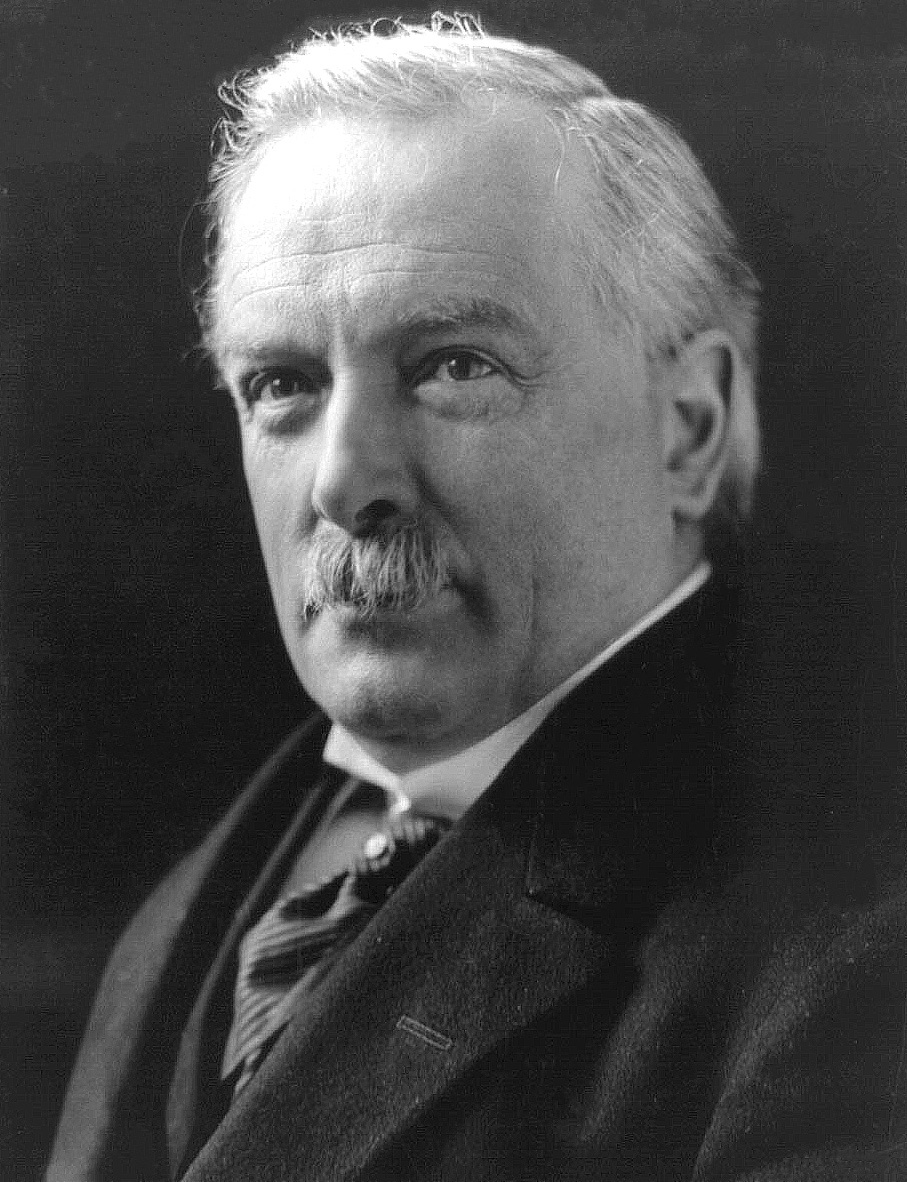
Moir was appointed to the Council of the Minister of Munitions during World War I by David Lloyd George (pictured).

During World War I Moir served on the Council of the Minister of Munitions for which service he was decorated with the award of Officer in the Legion of Honour. Described by David Lloyd George as "a man of exceptional ability and tact", initially Moir was responsible to Eric Geddes for machine gun production. Later Lloyd George appointed Moir to the Inventions Department of the Ministry of Munitions. Announcing this appointment to the House of Commons on 28 July 1915, Lloyd George stated:

I have appointed Mr E.W. Moir, a distinguished engineer who has already given valuable assistance to my department on a voluntary basis, to take charge of the new branch, and he will not only have an expert staff, but also a panel of scientific consultants on technical and scientific points.

However, Moir quickly found that the War Office was not inclined to co-operate fully with the Ministry. He wrote to Lloyd George about this in March 1915 which Lloyd George reprinted in full in his War Memoirs, using it as evidence of the difficulties and obstructiveness he had encountered as Minister of Munitions during the War.

The Moir Baronetcy, of Whitehanger in the parish of Fernhurst in the County of Sussex, was created in the Baronetage of the United Kingdom on 11 July 1916 for him.

Moir produced a design for concrete machine-gun pillboxes. Designed to be constructed from a system of interlocking precast concrete blocks, with a steel roof, around 1500 Moir pillboxes were eventually produced (with blocks cast at Richborough in Kent) and sent to the Western Front in 1918.

Moir was the founder and head of Ernest William Moir & Co Ltd, engineers, and a Director of S Pearson & Son Ltd and was President of the Junior Institution of Engineers (a forerunner, 1902–1970, of the Institution of Incorporated Engineers, later the IET) in 1929.

During the 1920s, he also helped one of the first female civil engineers meet Institution of Civil Engineers requirements that design engineers have site experience; Dorothy Donaldson Buchanan left London to work on the Silent Valley Reservoir project in Northern Ireland, and was supervised by Moir, eventually becoming the first female member of the ICE in 1927.

== Family life ==
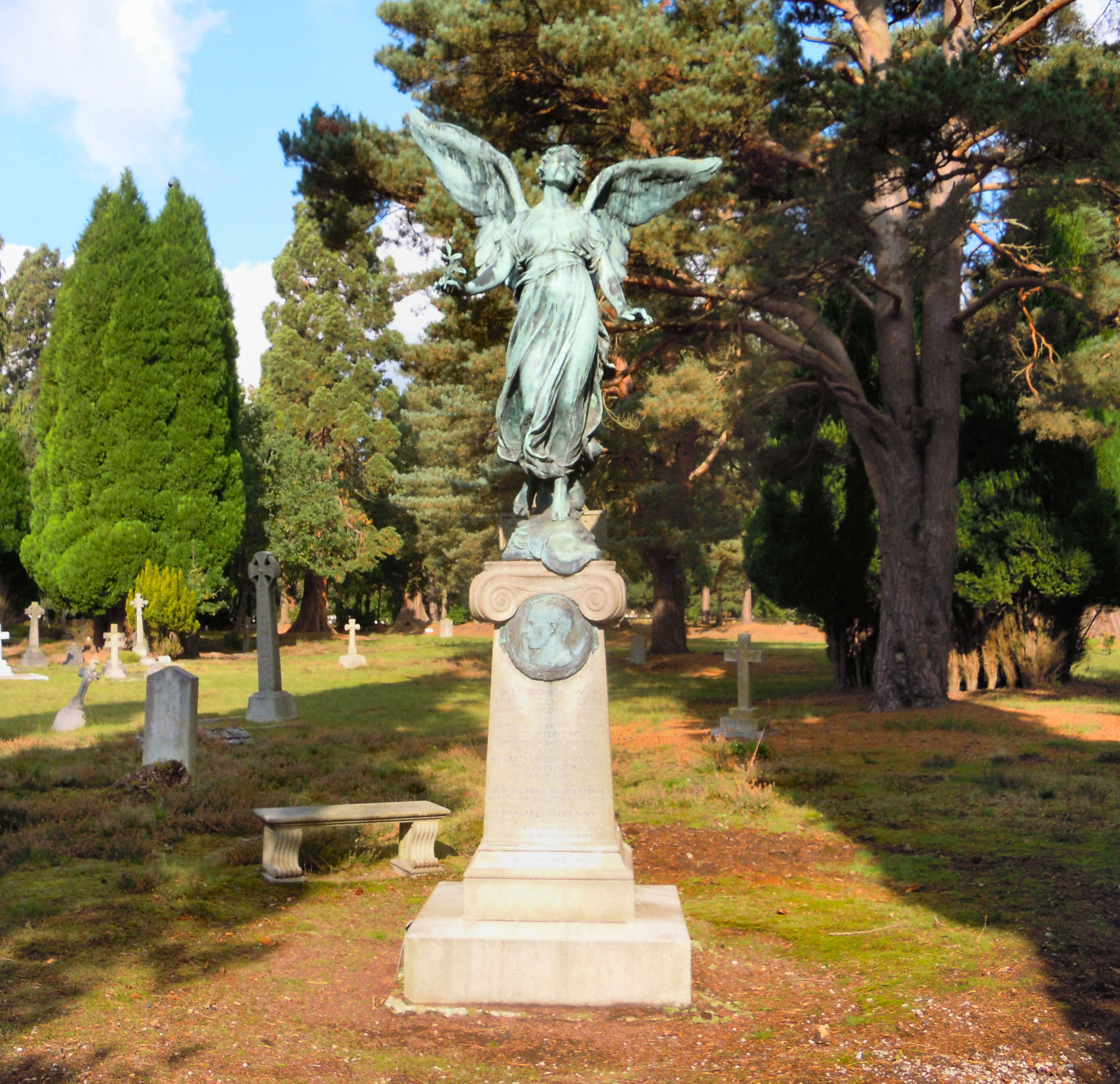
The Grade II listed Moir family grave in Brookwood Cemetery

Moir married Margaret Bruce Pennycook (1862–1942) on 4 June 1887.

Ernest William Moir died in 1933 aged 71 and is buried in the family plot at Brookwood Cemetery under a monument which is Grade II listed. This features a bronze profile portrait of Moir's son 2nd Lieutenant Reginald 'Rex' Moir (1893–1915) of the Royal Engineers, who died of meningitis in the Officers' Hospital in London. The angel sculpture surmounting the pedestal is by Lillian Wade. He was succeeded to the title by his second son, Sir Arrol Moir (1894–1957), named after William Arrol, his first benefactor.

Moir was survived by his wife Margaret, Lady Moir OBE, who described herself as "an engineer by marriage" as she had travelled with her husband on his many engineering projects. During World War I she organised the Weekend Relief Work Scheme whereby substitute workers covered for the women working in munitions factories allowing them time off. She herself worked as a relief lathe operator for 18 months. Lady Moir was a co-founder of the Women's Engineering Society in 1919. and an early member and president of the Electrical Association for Women.

== Sources ==
- Wallace, Sir Donald Mackenzie; Arthur T. Hadley; Hugh Chisholm, eds. (1902). "Greathead, James Henry". The New Volumes of the Encyclopædia Britannica. Vol. V, forming volume XXIX of the complete work (10th ed.). New York: The Encyclopædia Britannica Company.

Baronetage of the United Kingdom
New creation	Baronet (of Whitehanger); 1916–1933	Succeeded by Arrol Moir
