= Eland Cables =

British company

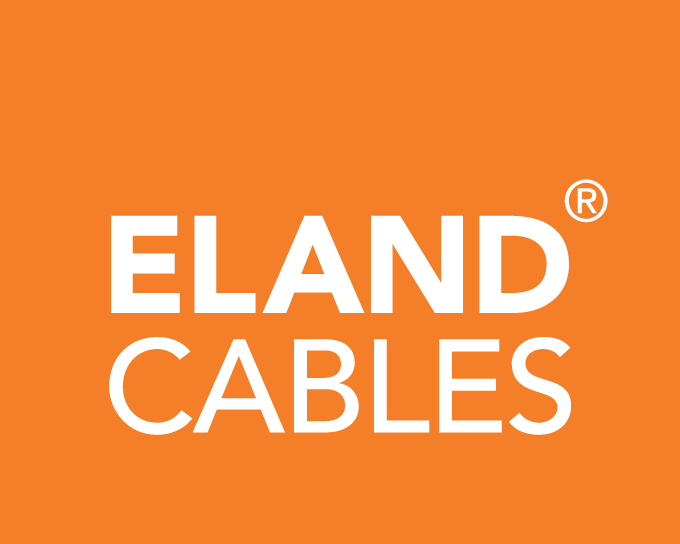
- Type: Private
- Industry: Electrical Cable
- Founded: 1975
- Headquarters: London, UK
- Area served: Global
- Key people: Jean-Sebastien Pelland (Executive Director) Kevin Chapman (Commercial Director)
- Products: Electrical Cable Low, Medium & High Voltage Power Telecommunications and Data Cables Control and Instrumentation Cables Cables for specialist industry including eMobility, Energy storage, Renewables, Railways, Marine
- Revenue: ^ 2025: £317M / €363.1M^ 2024: £274M / €313.9M^ 2023: £210M / €240.7M
- Number of employees: 200-500
- Website: www.elandcables.com

Eland Cables is a British company headquartered in London, with its principal operations, and testing laboratory in the UK, and operations across Europe. The company supplies electrical cables to the energy infrastructure industry worldwide. It specialises in cables used in large civil engineering works and in renewable energy, electrification and digitalisation projects. Its cables are typically used in power and control systems.

== History ==
Eland Cables was established in 1975. During its early history the company was owned by various corporate entities, including Unidare plc, before a management buy-out in 2005 returned the company to private ownership.

Its executive director, Jean-Sebastien Pelland, moved to London from Montreal in 2001, advising the company in its MBO before joining the board in 2008. In the early 2000s, the company expanded its operational capacity with the opening of a distribution centre in Doncaster, South Yorkshire, to support increased product range and demand.

It has supplied the cables for various major infrastructure projects across the UK and Europe, including the electrification of the Great Western Main Line and Tesla battery power projects.

The company changed its employee remuneration around 2017 due to workforce migration towards Amazon's jobs in its South Yorkshire warehouse. In response, the company adjusted its pay structure to link to a higher living wage, aligning with standards set by the independent Living Wage Foundation, alongside additional benefits such as health insurance coverage for all employees. It has linked its ESG strategy to the UN Global Compact Sustainable Development Goals, of which it is a signatory, and credits this work with aiding high retention rates and employee wellbeing.

During the 2010s and early 2020s, the company experienced growth linked to increased investment in electrification, renewable energy infrastructure, and digitalisation projects. From 2020, the company experienced a significant surge in demand and benefitting from private and public sector investment in decarbonisation and digitisation initiatives. In 2022, the company reported a turnover of £235.9 million, rising to £317 million in 2025, reflecting rising demand for cables in sectors such as energy infrastructure, battery storage, and automation.

The company attributes this growth to ambitious efforts across EMEA to overhaul energy supply and distribution networks. Additionally, it benefitted from high-growth sectors such as renewable energy, battery storage, mobility and automation. Eland Cables opened a large cable recycling plant that processes end-of-life cables and their materials. This facility recycles copper, aluminium, and other materials. Supporting sustainable operations, the company even recycles its floor sweepings and other site waste and turns non-recyclable materials into biofuel pellets for industrial kilns. This sustainability focus has helped them achieve Ecovadis Gold rating, which in turn is linked to unlocking green financing as the first company to benefit from HSBC UK's Sustainable Improvement Facility to the tune of over €80 million.

== Operations ==
Through its distribution and operations sites in the UK, Ireland and mainland Europe, Eland Cables supplies a range of electrical cables designed for power distribution, industrial control systems, telecommunications infrastructure, and instrumentation applications. These cables are manufactured according to national, European, and international technical standards.

Product categories:

- Low, medium and high voltage power cables
- Control and instrumentation cables
- Data and telecommunications cables
- Overhead line conductors used in rail and utility networks
- Cables for e mobility, battery storage and renewable energy systems

Their delivery fleet have been noted as using sustainable HVO as part of the fuel mix.

== The Cable Lab ==
A central component of Eland Cables' technical operations is The Cable Lab, a specialist in-house testing facility designed to verify cable performance, safety, and compliance with industry standards. The laboratory holds UKAS ISO/IEC 17025 and IECEE CBTL accreditations and conducts electrical, mechanical, and safety testing on cables.

The facility performs testing on both the company's own products and third-party cables, and its accreditation has been maintained since 2015.

== Infrastructure and Engineering Projects ==
Eland Cables has supplied cables for major infrastructure projects in transportation, energy distribution, and urban development. These include rail electrification projects such as the Great Western Main Line and infrastructure projects associated with metro and railway systems including Crossrail and the London Underground.

Customers include Network Rail, Siemens, and Vodafone, as well as electrical engineering houses, and the 'global tech giants'.

== Sustainability Initiatives ==
Eland Cables has introduced several initiatives related to environmental sustainability and circular-economy practices. These include a cable recycling facility designed to process end-of-life cables and recover materials such as copper and aluminium. The company also implemented installation of solar panels on rooftops, and transitioned its HGV delivery fleet to sustainable biofuels.

The company has also linked aspects of its environmental, social, and governance (ESG) strategy to the United Nations Global Compact Sustainable Development Goals, and the Science Based Targets Initiative; and has received Gold sustainability ratings from EcoVadis.

Eland Cables also secured a green finance package from HSBC worth £70m, which is linked to its EcoVadis Gold rating for its sustainability efforts.

== Workforce Employment ==
The company employs several hundred staff across its operations. In the late 2010s, Eland Cables revised its pay structure to commit to the UK Living Wage Foundation standards and introduced additional employee benefits.

Jean-Sebastien Pelland, the executive director, is regularly quoted in his support of the Real Living Wage and the commercial benefits it brings to his business, crediting it with aiding high retention rates and employee wellbeing. In 2009 the company was ranked among the top employers in the United Kingdom in the Sunday Times Best Companies to Work For survey for medium-sized businesses.

== See also ==
- Electrical cable
- Power transmission
- Renewable energy infrastructure
