= IndiGrid =

Indian power sector infrastructure investment trust

India Grid Trust (IndiGrid)
- Type: Power Sector Infrastructure Investment Trust
- Traded as: BSE: 540565; NSE: INDIGRID
- ISIN: INE219X23014
- Industry: Power
- Founded: 21 October 2016; 10 years ago
- Headquarters: Mumbai
- Key people: Harsh Shah, CEO and Director; Jyoti Kumar Agarwal, CFO; Jayashree Vaidhyanathan, Independent Director
- Products: Transmission Utility, Solar Generation
- Number of employees: 700
- Website: www.indigrid.co.in

India Grid Trust (IndiGrid) is an Indian power sector infrastructure investment trust (InvIT), sponsored by KKR & Sterlite Power (SPTL). Established on 21 October 2016, the entity is registered with SEBI pursuant to the InvIT regulations to own power transmission and renewable assets. Harsh Shah is the CEO and Director of IndiGrid and Jyoti Kumar Agarwal is the CFO.

IndiGrid is publicly listed on the Indian stock exchanges - NSE and BSE.

== History ==
In 2014, the Securities and Exchange Board of India (SEBI) introduced Infrastructure Investment Trusts (InvITs) regulations to support growth of infrastructure sector in India.

IndiGrid was established with Sterlite Power as its sponsor in October 2016, as per the SEBI InvITs Regulations.

In May 2017, IndiGrid opened its initial public offer (IPO) to raise ₹2,250. It is the first power sector InvIT and the second InvIT to get listed on exchange after IRB InvIT Fund.

In June 2017, IndiGrid got listed on BSE, NSE exchanges with two operational projects. Before the opening of IPO, IndiGrid had raised over Rs 1,012 crore from anchor investors such as Deutsche Global Infrastructure Fund, Credit Suisse (Singapore), Reliance Nippon Life Insurance Company, Copthall Mauritius Investment and Edelweiss Tokio Life Insurance Company.

In May 2019, IndiGrid raised over ₹ 2500 cr of primary capital through preferential issue allotment to KKR, GIC (23 & 20% stake respectively) and other eligible capital market investors.

In September 2020, IndiGrid unitholders approved induction of global investment firm KKR's associate Esoteric II as a sponsor with special majority (> 75 per cent voting).

In December 2020, IndiGrid announced a multi-year collaboration agreement with IBM to build an artificial intelligence (AI)-enabled asset management platform.

In June 2017, IndiGrid was listed on Indian Stock Exchanges with two Initial Portfolio Assets with AUM of INR 38 billion - Bhopal Dhule Transmission Company Limited and Jabalpur Transmission Company Limited, with a total network of 8 transmission lines of around 1,936 ckms and 2 substations of 6,000 mva capacity across 4 states.

== Acquisition & merger ==
In February 2018, IndiGrid completed the acquisition of 3 transmission assets from its sponsor Sterlite Power Grid Ventures Ltd for Rs 1,410 crore. The assets were Purulia & Kharagpur Transmission Company Limited, RAPP Transmission Company Limited and Maheshwaram Transmission Limited.

In September 2018, IndiGrid completed the Rs 232-crore investment in Patran Transmission Company (PTCL). This was IndiGrid's first investment in a third-party asset.

In July 2019, IndiGrid completed the acquisition of two power transmission assets from Sterlite Power for an enterprise value of Rs 5,025 crore. These two assets are NRSS XXIX Transmission (NTL) and Odisha Generation Phase-II Transmission (OGPTL).

In March 2020, IndiGrid completed the acquisition of its ninth transmission asset from Sterlite Power at a value of US$134 million or Rs 1,020 crore, with the acquisition of East-North Interconnection (ENICL).

In May 2020, IndiGrid signed an agreement to acquire 100% stake in a power transmission asset at Jhajjar in Haryana for Rs 310 crore from current owners Kalpataru Power Transmission and Techno Electric & Engineering Company.

During the same time (August 2020), IndiGrid acquired another power transmission asset – Gurgaon Palwal Transmission (GPTL) project at an enterprise value of around Rs 1,080 crore.

In November 2020, IndiGrid signed a share purchase agreement to acquire 74% stake in Parbati Koldam Transmission Co. Ltd. from Anil Ambani group's Reliance Infrastructure Ltd. The enterprise value of the transmission asset was around Rs 900 crore (US$121.6 million). Taking this into consideration, an acquisition of 74% of shares should translate into a deal value of Rs 666 crore (US$90 million).

In December 2020, IndiGrid Trust entered into an agreement to acquire 100% stake in FRV Andhra Pradesh Solar Farm-I Pvt. Ltd and FRV India Solar Park II Pvt. Ltd. From FRV Solar Holdings XI B.V.

In March 2021, IndiGrid InvIT acquired NER-II Transmission Ltd from Sterlite Power at an enterprise value of Rs 4,625 crore. This is the largest single asset deal in the Indian Transmission sector. With this acquisition, IndiGrid's AUM (Asset Under Management) increased 34 per cent to Rs 20,000 crore.
