= James Joseph Allport =

Railway company manager (1811–1892)

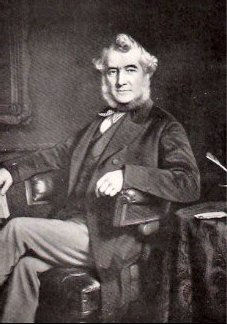
Sir James Allport

Sir James Joseph Allport (27 February 1811 – 25 April 1892) was an English railway manager.

== Life ==
James was a son of William Allport, of Birmingham and was associated with railways from an early period of his life.

He joined the Birmingham and Derby Junction Railway in 1839 as the traffic agent at Hampton in Arden, becoming Chief Clerk, then General Manager in 1843. When it merged into the Midland Railway, he moved to George Hudson's York, Newcastle and Berwick Railway until it merged into the North Eastern Railway.

Six years later he assumed the charge of the Manchester, Sheffield and Lincolnshire Railway (later renamed the Great Central Railway), and finally, in 1853, was appointed to the general managership of the Midland Railway; an office which he held continuously, with the exception of a few years between 1857 and 1860, when he was managing director to Palmer's Shipbuilding Company at Jarrow, until his retirement in 1880, when he became a director.

During these 27 years, the Midland grew to be one of the most important railway systems in England, partly by the absorption of smaller lines and partly by the construction of two main extensions on the south to London and on the north to Carlisle whereby it obtained an independent through-route between the metropolis and the north. He was instrumental in the Midland's partnership with the MS&L, which led to the "Sheffield and Midland Railway Companies' Committee", and gave the Midland access to Manchester for its London trains.

In the railway world Allport was known as a keen tactician and a vigorous fighter, and he should be remembered as the pioneer of cheap and comfortable railway travelling. He was the first to appreciate the importance of the third-class passenger as a source of revenue, and accordingly, in 1872, he inaugurated the policy, subsequently adopted more or less completely by all the railways of Great Britain, of carrying third-class passengers in well-fitted carriages (at the uniform rate, decreed by Parliament, of one penny a mile on all trains).

The diminution in the receipts from second-class passengers, which was one of the results, was regarded by some authorities as a sign of the lack of wisdom of his action, but, to him, it appeared a sufficient reason for the abolition of second-class carriages, which therefore disappeared from the Midland system in 1875, the first-class fares being at the same time substantially reduced. He was also the first to introduce the Pullman car on British railways.

He was a director of the Midland from 1854 to 1857, but returned to being the general manager. When he retired in 1880 he was given an honorary directorship, and was knighted in 1884.

Allport was sponsor of an Act of Parliament in 1883 to install a network of high-pressure cast iron water mains under London. It merged two of Edward B. Ellington's companies to form the London Hydraulic Power Company, which eventually powered machinery in docks and buildings across large areas of central London.

Allport died at the Midland Grand Hotel, St. Pancras, on 25 April 1892, from acute inflammation of the lungs, the result of a chill. His funeral at Belper Cemetery took place on 29 April 1892.

== Sources ==
- Chisholm, Hugh, ed. (1911). "Allport, Sir James Joseph" . Encyclopædia Britannica. Vol. 1 (11th ed.). Cambridge University Press. pp. 708–709.
