= Tower Subway =

Tunnel beneath the River Thames in London

Coordinates: 51°30′30″N 0°4′44″W

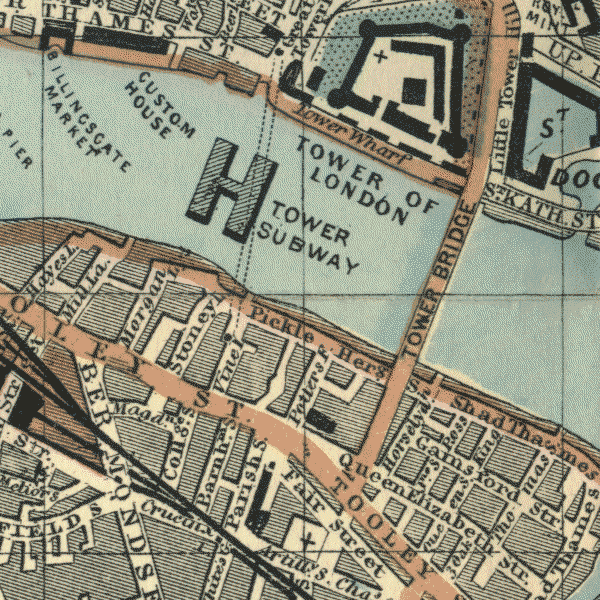
Location of the Tower Subway (1895)

The Tower Subway is a tunnel beneath the River Thames in central London, between Tower Hill on the north bank of the river and Vine Lane (off Tooley Street) on the south. In 1869 a 1,340-foot-long (410 m) circular tunnel was dug through the London clay using a cast iron circular shield independently invented and built by James Henry Greathead, similar to an idea that had been patented in 1864 by Peter W. Barlow but never built.

A 2 ft 6 in (762 mm) narrow-gauge railway was laid in the tunnel and from August 1870, a cable-hauled wooden carriage conveyed passengers from one end to the other. This was not a financial success, however, and the company went bankrupt by the end of the year. The tunnel was converted to pedestrian use and one million people a year crossed under the river, paying a toll of a ha'penny. The opening of the toll-free Tower Bridge nearby in 1894 caused a drop in income, and the tunnel closed in 1898, after being sold to the London Hydraulic Power Company. Today the tunnel is used for water mains and telecommunications cables.

The same shield method of construction was used in 1890 to dig the tunnels of the City and South London Railway, the first of London's electrified "Tube" railways and the first underground electrified railway in the world.

== History ==
=== Construction ===
Tower Subway Act 1868
- Act of Parliament
- Parliament of the United Kingdom
- Long title: An Act to authorize the Construction of a Subway under the Thames from Tower Hill to the opposite Side of the River.
- Citation: 31 & 32 Vict. c. viii

Dates
- Royal assent: 29 May 1868

Status: Current legislation

Text of statute as originally enacted

Tower Subway (Capital) Act 1871
- Act of Parliament
- Parliament of the United Kingdom
- Long title: An Act to enable the Tower Subway Company to raise additional Capital.
- Citation: 34 & 35 Vict. c. vii

Dates
- Royal assent: 25 May 1871

Text of statute as originally enacted

In 1864, Peter Barlow applied for a patent for a design of a circular cast iron shield for tunnelling to fill the gap between the tunnel lining and wall with lime or cement to prevent settling of the surrounding ground. Unfortunately, Barlow failed to explain how he intended to fill such gaps between shield and tunnel wall with grout, and he never constructed it before his death. Greathead, however, invented a device to inject the grout and was credited with the first shield construction for what is now known as the Tower Gateway complex in 1869.

Barlow published a pamphlet in 1867, "On the Relief of London Street Traffic", suggesting a network of tunnels with cars carrying up to twelve people. In 1868, authority was obtained in the Tower Subway Act 1868 (31 & 32 Vict. c. viii) for a tunnel under the Thames between Great Tower Hill and Pickle Herring Stairs near Vine Street (now Vine Lane), but there was a delay finding a contractor after experiences with the Thames Tunnel until his former pupil James Henry Greathead tendered for £9,400.

According to William Charles Copperthwaite, who once studied and worked under Greathead, both Greathead in England and Alfred Ely Beach in New York invented and constructed their own versions of tunnelling shields simultaneously and independently of each other. Beach used a circular shield remarkably similar to Peter W. Barlow's patent application design. This would not have been an unexpected event as Beach oversaw a successful patent agency in New York as the editor of The Scientific American, and may well have heard of Tower Subway developments in London and found Barlow's patent application.

Work on the Tower Subway began in February 1869 with the boring of entrance shafts, 60 feet (18 m) deep on the north bank and 50 feet (15 m) deep on the south bank. The tunnelling itself started in April using the circular Greathead shield.

Although the shield has been called a "Barlow–Greathead" shield, William Copperthwaite says:

"... in 1868 [Barlow] provisionally patented a shield having near the cutting edge a transverse partition or diaphragm. Neither of these designs took practical form, and in 1869 Greathead in England and Beach in New York actually built and used shields having many features in common with Barlow's patents but differing from each other in details... Beach's shield resembled Barlow's patent of 1864, and Greathead's the provisional patent of 1868."

Copperthwaite puts to bed all arguments that tunnelling shields originated with Barlow's patented but unimplemented idea in 1864, and instead argues that Greathead built and first used a different patented device on the Tower Subway, and simultaneously in New York. Beach created and made his own shield independently of Barlow's and Greathead's designs. Barlow lost out on credit because he never actually constructed one, only patenting the idea. Copperthwaite also reveals that Greathead was unaware of the 1868 provisional patent of Barlow's until 1895, a fact discussed in an 1895 Institution of Civil Engineers paper on the City and South London Railway acknowledged by Barlow.

A tunnel 1,340 feet (410 m) long was dug with a diameter of 6 feet 7 3/4 inches (2.026 m), a maximum of 66 feet (20 m) below the high-water level. This was bored through a stable layer of the London clay that lay 22 feet (7 m) below the river bed, below the soft alluvial deposits that had plagued the construction by Brunel of the earlier Thames Tunnel. This, combined with the simpler nature of the project – the excavation face was only one twentieth that of the Thames Tunnel – enabled faster progress. Screw jacks drove the shield forward at a rate of 37 feet 4 inches (11.38 m) each week. The under-river section was dug in fourteen weeks and the tunnel completed in December 1869.

=== Cable railway ===
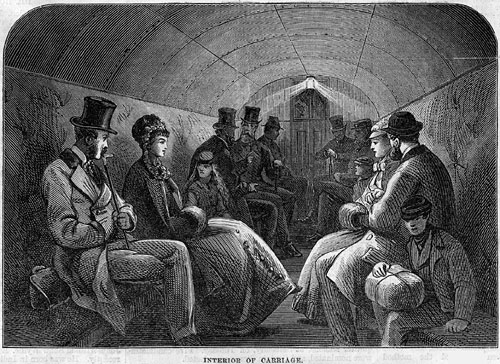
Interior of the Tower Subway cable car, 1870

The entrance shafts were fitted with steam-powered lifts for passengers. The tunnel was laid with 2 ft 6 in (762 mm) gauge railway track and a single car, carrying a maximum of 12 passengers, cable-hauled by two 4-horsepower (3.0 kW) stationary steam engines, one on each side of the river.

The tunnel was completed by February 1870, and a press launch was held the following April. The underground railway opened for public use on 2 August 1870 charging 2d for first class and 1d for second class, first class ticket holders merely having priority for the lifts and when boarding. However, the system was unreliable and uneconomic. The company went into receivership in November 1870, and the railway closed on 7 December 1870, four months after opening.

=== Foot tunnel ===
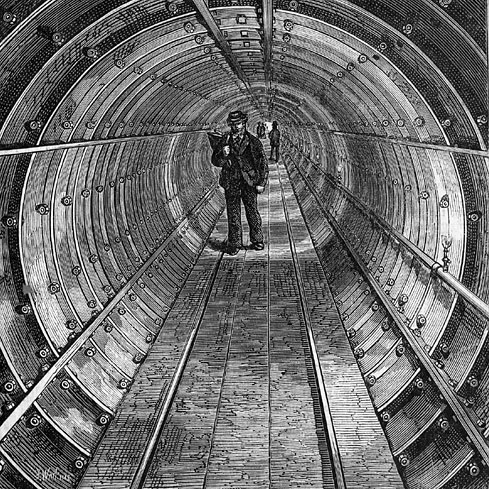
The Tower Subway in 1870

The railcar and steam engines were removed, gaslights installed, and the passenger lifts replaced with spiral staircases. The tunnel opened to pedestrians on 24 December 1870 at a toll of 1/2d and became a popular way to cross the river, averaging 20,000 people a week (one million a year). Its main users were described as "the working classes who were formerly entirely dependent on the ferries". In September 1888 the subway briefly achieved notoriety after a man with a knife was seen in the tunnel at the time when Jack the Ripper was committing murders in nearby Whitechapel.

In his Dictionary of London, Charles Dickens Jr commented on the smallness of the tunnel: "there is not much head-room left, and it is not advisable for any but the very briefest of Her Majesty's lieges to attempt the passage in high-heeled boots, or with a hat to which he attaches any particular value."

The Italian writer Edmondo De Amicis (1846–1908) gave a description of a passage through the subway in his Jottings about London:

As I was thinking of these things I disappeared from the world indeed, going down a lighted spiral staircase which buries itself in the earth on the right bank of the Thames, opposite the Tower. I went down and down between two dingy walls until I found myself at the round opening of the gigantic iron tube, which seems to undulate like a great intestine in the enormous belly of the river. The inside of this tube presents the appearance of a subterranean corridor, of which the end is invisible. It is lighted by a row of lights as far as you can see, which shed a veiled light, like sepulchral lamps; the atmosphere is foggy; you go along considerable stretches without meeting a soul; the walls sweat like those of an aqueduct; the floor moves under your feet like the deck of a vessel; the steps and voices of the people coming the other way give forth a cavernous sound, and are heard before you see the people, and they at a distance seem like great shadows; there is, in short, a sort of something mysterious, which without alarming causes in your heart a vague sense of disquiet. When then you have reached the middle and no longer see the end in either direction, and feel the silence of a catacomb, and know not how much farther you must go, and reflect that in the water beneath, in the obscure depths of the river, is where suicides meet death, and that over your head vessels are passing, and that if a crack should open in the wall you would not even have the time to recommend your soul to God, in that moment how lovely seems the sun!

I believe I had come a good part of a mile when I reached the opposite opening on the left bank of the Thames; I went up a staircase, the mate of the other, and came out in front of the Tower of London.

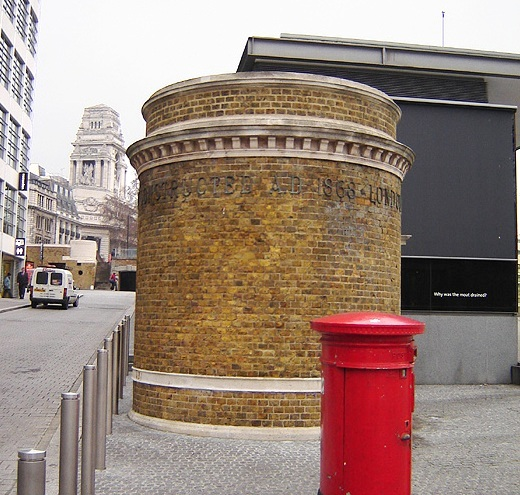
Tower Subway northern entrance building at Tower Hill (January 2006). Built by the LHPC in 1926, the lettering on the visible side reads "constructed a.d. 1868 · london".

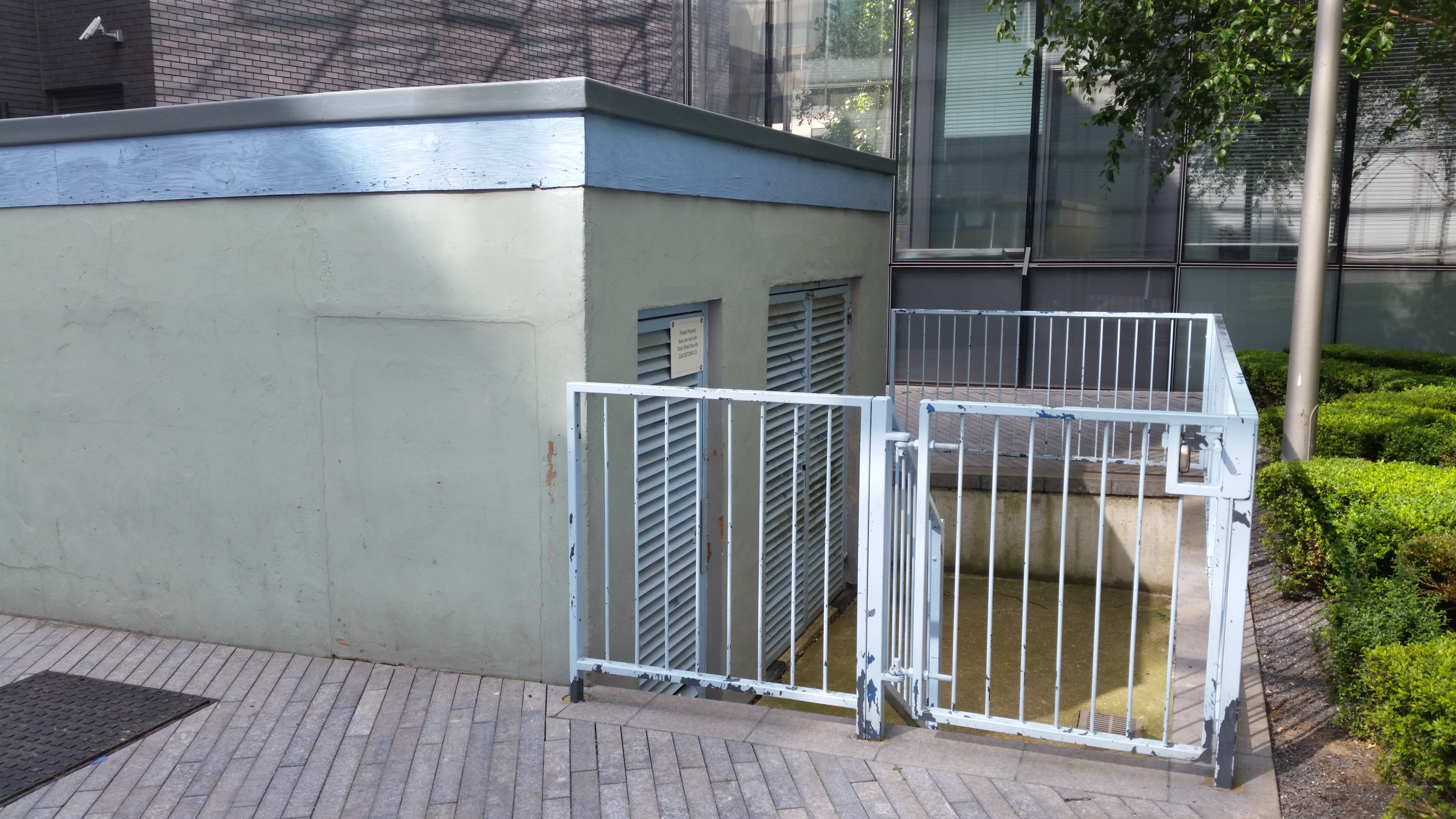
Locked entrance to the Tower Subway on the South Bank

Tower Subway Act 1897
- Act of Parliament
- Parliament of the United Kingdom
- Long title: An Act to enable the Tower Subway Company to sell their Subway under the Thames from Tower Hill to the opposite side of the River and to dissolve the Company.
- Citation: 60 & 61 Vict. c.xcvii

Dates
- Royal assent: 15 July 1897

Text of statute as originally enacted

In 1894, the toll-free Tower Bridge opened a few hundred yards downriver, causing a drop in the subway's income. The Tower Bridge Subway Company sued the Corporation of London for £30,000 for loss of revenue. Engineer Edward Cruttwell was a key witness in the arbitration, arguing that the claim was unfounded, with the subway being in a "very neglected condition."

In 1897, Parliament passed a local act, the Tower Subway Act 1897 (60 & 61 Vict. c.xcvii) authorising the sale of the tunnel to the London Hydraulic Power Company (LHPC) for £3,000 (worth over £337,132 in 2025), and the subway closed to pedestrian traffic in 1898.

=== Utility tunnel ===
After its closure, the tunnel gained a new purpose as a route for hydraulic power mains operated by the LHPC and for water mains. It was damaged during the Second World War when a German bomb fell in the river near Tower Pier in December 1940, and exploded on the river bed very close to the tunnel's roof. The shock of the blast compressed the tunnel radially, reducing its diameter to 4 feet (1.2 m) at the point of impact, but the tunnel's lining was not penetrated. During the course of repair work, it was found that – apart from the bomb damage – the tunnel had survived seventy years of use in excellent condition.

== The subway today ==
While it is no longer used for hydraulic tubes, the tunnel still carries water mains. The hydraulic tubes, once a major source of power in the centre of London, have since been replaced by fibre optic telecommunications links.

A small round entrance building survives at Tower Hill near the Tower of London's ticket office, a short distance to the west of the main entrance to the Tower. This is not the original entrance but was built in 1926 by the London Hydraulic Power Company, with a ring of lettering giving the original date of construction and naming the LHPC. The entrance on the south bank of the Thames was demolished in the 1990s, and a new one has been built in its place. It is located just behind the Unicorn Theatre on Tooley Street, but there is no plaque to mark the site.

A video inside the tunnel from the current owners, Vodafone, was released in February 2023.

== See also ==
- Tunnels underneath the River Thames
- List of crossings of the River Thames
