= Lillian Wade =

British sculptor (1870-1923

Lillian Maud Wade née Morris (1870– 4 December 1923) was a British sculptor.

== Biography ==
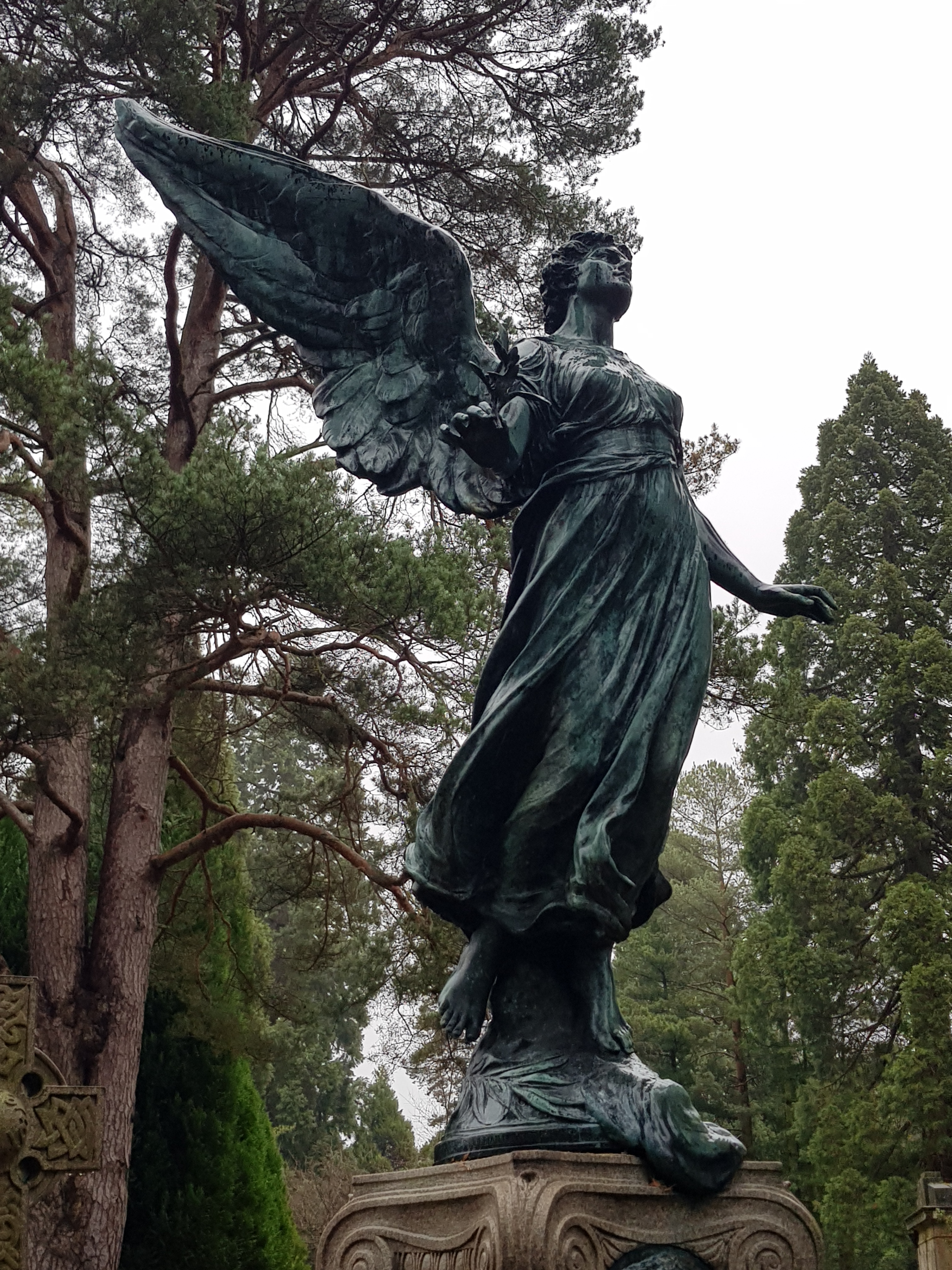
The Moir family memorial, Brookwood Cemetery

Wade was born in the Battersea area of London and studied at the National Art Training School in South Kensington, between 1895 and 1897, where she was taught by Edouard Lanteri. Later in her career, Wade worked as a studio assistant to Lanteri. Between 1900 and 1916 she exhibited a number of statuettes, reliefs and portrait busts at the Royal Academy in London. These included her 1907 bronze statuette of a winged Victory figure. Wade developed this design, into a winged Peace figure, for a grave monument to members of the Moir family, at Brookwood Cemetery in Woking. The monument is recognised by Historic England with a Grade II listing.

Wade's daughter, Evelyn, married the sculptor Charles Sargeant Jagger in 1925 and one of their daughters, Gillian Jagger also became a sculptor of considerable note.
