= Manchester Hydraulic Power =

Public hydraulic power network

- An original steam-powered hydraulic pump, converted to electrical operation, on display at the Museum of Science and Industry

- Location within Greater Manchester
- Type: Hydraulic power network
- Location: Manchester, England
- Coordinates: 53.4814°N 2.2534°W
- Opened: 1894
- Closed: 1972

Manchester's Hydraulic Power system was a public hydraulic power network supplying energy across the city of Manchester via a system of high-pressure water pipes from three pumping stations from 1894 until 1972. The system, which provided a cleaner and more compact alternative to steam engines, was used to power workshop machinery, lifts, cranes and a large number of cotton baling presses in warehouses as it was particularly useful for processes that required intermittent power. It was used to wind Manchester Town Hall clock, pump the organ at Manchester Cathedral and raise the safety curtain at Manchester Opera House in Quay Street. A large number of the lifts and baling presses that used the system had hydraulic packings manufactured by John Talent and Co.Ltd. who had a factory at Ashworth Street, just off the Bury New Rd. close to the Salford boundary.

Manchester Corporation opened its first pumping station in 1894, following pioneering schemes in Kingston upon Hull and London. The scheme was a success and additional pumping stations to cope with the demand for power were added in 1899 and 1909. Modernisation started in the 1920s, when the original steam pumps were replaced by electric motors at two pumping stations. The greatest volume of water was supplied in the 1920s, although the length of the water mains continued to increase until 1948. Usage started to decrease in the 1930s, and the first pumping station closed in 1939. By the 1960s, there were serious concerns about the state of some of the equipment and corrosion in the high-pressure mains, and in 1968 the corporation announced its intent to switch the system off, which it did at the end of 1972.

The grade II listed pumping station built in Baroque style at Water Street has a new life as part of the People's History Museum, while one of its pump sets has been restored and is displayed at the Museum of Science and Industry, where it is part of a larger display about hydraulic power.

== History ==
While Joseph Bramah had registered a patent for the distribution of high-pressure water via a ring main at the London Patent Office on 29 April 1812, and engineer William Armstrong had installed hydraulic systems for single customers from the 1840s, the first installation of a public hydraulic power network became operational in Kingston upon Hull in 1876. Edward B. Ellington was responsible, and created the General Hydraulic Power Company, from which developed the London Hydraulic Power Company. With the technology tested, and Ellington's model of marketing hydraulic power as a public utility having proved successful, Manchester Corporation obtained an act of Parliament, the Manchester Corporation Act 1891 (54 & 55 Vict. c. ccvii), authorising it to build a network to distribute hydraulic power to the city in 1891.

The corporation had the advantage over a private company in that it did not have to apply for permission to dig up the streets to install the network of high-pressure water mains. The pumping station was situated on Whitworth Street West, between Oxford Road railway station and the Rochdale Canal. Its working pressure was set at 1,120 pounds per square inch (77 bar), much higher than the 700 pounds per square inch (48 bar) of the London system, because it was expected that much of the power would be used for baling cotton, and the extra pressure was dictated by the design of existing baling equipment. Pressure was supplied by six triple-expansion steam engines, rated at 200 hp (150 kW) each, and was maintained by two hydraulic accumulators, with pistons of 18-inch (460 mm) diameter, a stroke of 23 feet (7.0 m), and loaded with 127 tonnes. The equipment was supplied by Ellington's company. Installation was completed by 1894, and by 1895 there were 12 miles (19 km) of hydraulic pipes under the city streets, providing power for 247 machines.

Demand was high, and a second pumping station commenced operation on 6 July 1899. It was constructed at Pott Street in Ancoats, close to the Rochdale Canal, and had four pumping engines and two accumulators. The number of engines was increased to seven, six of 210 hp (160 kW) and one of 350 hp (260 kW). A third pumping station was soon required and was constructed between Water Street and the River Irwell. It had two accumulators, and six steam engines. Coal for the engines was delivered by boat, and it began operating on 14 October 1909. Although all three pumping stations were situated beside waterways, its water supply was obtained from boreholes. The borehole at Whitworth Street was 613 feet (187 m) deep, and water at all three was raised by compressed air delivery systems, which lasted until 1948, when they were superseded by submersible pumps. By the 1930s, the system had grown to 35 miles (56 km) of pipes working some 2,400 machines.

Replacement of the steam engines began in 1922, starting at Whitworth Street. Four pumping engines were removed and replaced by electrically driven centrifugal pumps. The work was completed by 1924. The following year, the remaining pumps were retained, but their steam cylinders were removed, and the flywheels replaced by a helical gear drive, to connect the pumps to 220 hp (160 kW) electric motors. These were variable speed direct current devices, and a motor converter set had to be installed, to provide the low voltage DC supply from the incoming high voltage alternating current supply. The motor converter set was built in 1914, and was second-hand. The pumps at the Water Street station were converted to electrical operation in a similar manner soon afterwards.

== Decline ==
Demand for hydraulic power began to fall in the 1930s, as electric power became more popular, but although the number of customers dropped, the supply pipes were extended until the system reached its maximum length of 35.5 miles (57.1 km) in 1948. The Pott Street pumping station closed in 1939. By the 1960s, the motor converter set was 50 years old, and most of the pumps were older still. The effects of corrosion on high-pressure water mains were also a cause for concern. In 1964, a similar system in Glasgow, opened a year later than the Manchester system using water at 1,120 psi (77 bar) was switched off and some of its equipment was used to refit Whitworth Street station. The two centrifugal pumps and a converted steam pump were removed and replaced by two high-speed reciprocating pumps from Glasgow. Although not ideal for a diminishing network, because they were fixed speed devices, they provided a back-up system if there were problems at Water Street.

By 1968, the length of pressure main was reduced to 26 miles (42 km), and the Waterworks Committee gave notice to all 120 customers that the system would be shut down in four years' time. By that time, the stations were supplying 2 million gallons (9.1 Megalitres) of pressurised water per year, down from the 360 million gallons (1,600 Ml) supplied when the system was at its peak. The system was switched off on 28 December 1972, when the Chairman of the Waterworks Committee stopped the pumps at a ceremony.

== Pumping stations ==
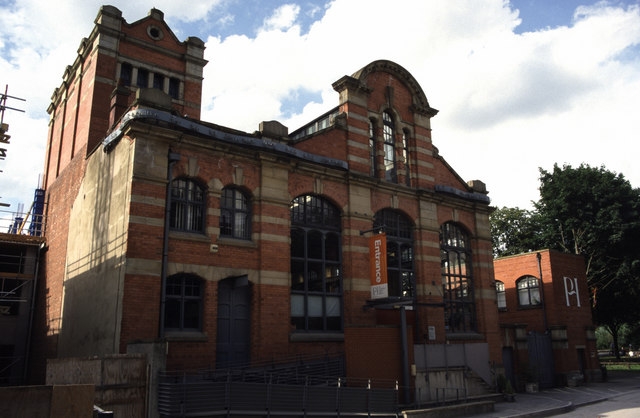
The Water Street pumping station now houses the People's History Museum

The three hydraulic power stations were located at Whitworth Street West, Pott Street and Water Street.

The Whitworth Street station was opened in 1894 on the banks of the Rochdale Canal, between the canal and Oxford Road railway station, immediately to the west of St Mary's Hospital. It was the first to be upgraded to electrical operation, but was little used after 1964, as it held equipment bought from Glasgow, which was only used as a backup. After the system closed, its contents were sold for scrap and the building was demolished.

Pott Street station was in Ancoats and opened in 1899. It was not electrified, and closed in 1939. Its site and the site at Pott Street have disappeared under the car park at the Central Retail Park in Ancoats.

The third station at Water Street, on the banks of the River Irwell was completed in 1909, and was designed in Baroque style by architect Henry Price. The station was electrified in 1925, and was the location for the closing ceremony at the end of 1972. After closure, it was used as a workshop by the City College. In 1992, it was designated a grade II listed structure, and since 1994 has been part of the People's History Museum complex. One of the pump sets has been moved to the Museum of Science and Industry, where it has been restored to working order and forms part of a display about hydraulic power. The pumps were made by the Manchester firm of Galloways. It is now referred to as the Bridge Street station, because the part of Water Street on which it stood has disappeared in the redevelopment of the area.

Point	Coordinates (Links to map resources)	OS Grid Ref	Notes
Whitworth Street pumping station	53.4744°N 2.2431°W	SJ839975	In use 1894 to 1972
Pott Street pumping station	53.4835°N 2.2256°W	SJ851985	In use 1899 to 1939
Water Street pumping station	53.4814°N 2.2534°W	SJ832983	In use 1909 to 1972. Now a museum.

== See also ==
- London Hydraulic Power Company
- Liverpool Hydraulic Power Company

== Bibliography ==
- Field, Corinne (16 August 2004). "Pump Up The Volume - Manchester Hydraulic Heritage". Culture 24.
- McNeil, Ian (1972). Hydraulic Power. Longman Group. ISBN 978-0-582-12797-5.
- Pugh, B (1980). The Hydraulic Age: Public Power Supplies before Electricity. Mechanical Engineering Publications. ISBN 978-0-85298-447-5.
