= Gillian Jagger =

American sculptor

Gillian Jagger (October 27, 1930 – October 21, 2019) was a British multimedia sculptor and installation artist, based in the Hudson Valley of the United States. She is known for her plaster castings of manhole covers on the streets of New York City in the 1960s, during which time she was "erroneously being identified as a Pop artist". In her work Jagger "[appropriates] materials from nature", and incorporates tracings, rubbings, and castings of found objects in both urban and rural environments.

== Personal life ==
Gillian Jagger was born in the United Kingdom in 1930. Her father, sculptor Charles Sargeant Jagger, was known for his war memorials, most notably the Royal Artillery Memorial at Hyde Park Corner in London. Jagger’s maternal grandmother, Lillian Wade was also a professional sculptor. After the death of her father Jagger’s mother remarried, when she was aged 7, to an American coal industrialist and the family relocated to Buffalo, New York.

The artist has worked and resided in a converted "five-barn" dairy farm in Kerhonkson, New York, with her partner Consuelo (Connie) Mander since 1978.

== Early career ==
In 1953 Jagger received her BFA in painting at Carnegie Tech (now Carnegie Mellon University), where artist Andy Warhol was also an alumnus. Although Jagger and Warhol were contemporaries and "friends", Jagger disaffiliated herself from the Pop Art movement associated with Warhol’s Factory. She writes:

…the worst for me was that I was identified on all those news programmes and newspapers as a Pop artist. I was certain that I wasn't. I didn't know much about Pop Art – but I knew I did not like beer cans or pieces of pie under plastic covers.

Jagger later studied under Vaclav Vytlacil at the Colorado Springs Fine Arts Center, Colorado; and completed further studies at the University of Buffalo, New York and Columbia University. She received a Masters of Art from New York University in 1960.

== Later career ==
In 1968 Jagger joined the faculty of Pratt Institute in Brooklyn, where she taught for 40 years. She also held teaching positions at New York University, Post University, and New Rochelle Academy. She died in New York.

== Work ==
Gillian Jagger worked in large-scale plaster, stone, cast cement, and sheet lead; as well as found biogenic substances such as animal carcasses and sections of fallen tree trunks. Often the artist casts readymade materials from nature, including her own body. “An interest in time, tracks, imprints and shadows has long dominated my work,” she writes.

In her early work Jagger cast automobile tracks, footprints, and various infrastructural elements of the urban built environment. Her castings of manhole covers on the streets of New York City attracted attention from local and national news media during the early 1960s. At the time Jagger was being misidentified as a Pop artist. She explains, however, that this epithet was "a distortion of what [she] was actually trying to achieve". "That wasn't what I was going for," she said; "I was trying to make a statement about what would be here when we were all gone." Jagger later said of the period: "I was casting facts because I couldn't believe in the metaphors."
