= Moir baronets =

Baronetcy in the Baronetage of the United Kingdom

There have been two baronetcies created for persons with the surname Moir, one in the Baronetage of Nova Scotia and one in the Baronetage of the United Kingdom.

The Moir Baronetcy, of Longford in the County of Nottingham, was created in the Baronetage of Nova Scotia on 18 June 1636 for Edward Moir. The title became either extinct or dormant on his death in 1644.

The Moir Baronetcy, of Whitehanger in the parish of Fernhurst in the County of Sussex, was created in the Baronetage of the United Kingdom on 11 July 1916 for Ernest William Moir. He was the founder and head of Ernest William Moir & Co Ltd, engineers, and a Director of S Pearson & Son Ltd.

== Moir baronets, of Longford (1636) ==
- Sir Edward Moir, 1st Baronet (c. 1610–1644)

== Moir baronets, of Whitehanger (1916) ==
- Sir Ernest William Moir, 1st Baronet (1862–1933)
- Sir Arrol Moir, 2nd Baronet (1894–1957)
- Sir Ernest Ian Royds Moir, 3rd Baronet (1925–1998)
- Sir Christopher Ernest Moir, 4th Baronet (born 1955)

The heir apparent is the present holder's son Oliver Royds Moir (born 1984).
