= London Hydraulic Power Company =

Former UK business 1883–1977

The London Hydraulic Power Company was established in 1883 to install a hydraulic power network in London. This expanded to cover most of central London at its peak, before being replaced by electricity, with the final pump house closing in 1977.

== History ==
Wharves and Warehouses Steam Power and Hydraulic Pressure Company's Act 1871
- Act of Parliament
- Parliament of the United Kingdom
- Long title: An Act for the Incorporation of the Wharves and Warehouses Steam Power and Hydraulic Pressure Company; and for other purposes.
- Citation: 34 & 35 Vict. c. cxxi

Dates
- Royal assent: 13 July 1871

Text of statute as originally enacted

London Hydraulic Power Act 1884
- Act of Parliament
- Parliament of the United Kingdom
- Long title: An Act to extend the District to enlarge the Powers and to change the name of the Wharves and Warehouses Steam Power and Hydraulic Pressure Company; and for other purposes.
- Citation: 47 & 48 Vict. c. lxxii

Dates
- Royal assent: 23 June 1884

London Hydraulic Power Act 1953
- Act of Parliament
- Parliament of the United Kingdom
- Long title: An Act to confer further powers on the London Hydraulic Power Company and for other purposes.
- Citation: 1 & 2 Eliz. 2. c. viii

Dates
- Royal assent: 6 May 1953

Text of statute as originally enacted

The company was set up by an act of Parliament, the London Hydraulic Power Act 1884 (47 & 48 Vict. c. lxxii), sponsored by railway engineer Sir James Allport, (Note: Some accounts incorrectly name him as Sir John Allport. Sir James had direct experience of hydraulic power, having deployed the technology to power cranes at Newcastle-upon-Tyne Central railway station.) to install a network of high-pressure cast iron water mains under London. It merged the Wharves and Warehouses Steam Power and Hydraulic Pressure Company, founded in 1871 by Edward B. Ellington, and the General Hydraulic Power Company, founded in 1882. The network gradually expanded to cover an area mostly north of the Thames from Hyde Park in the west to Docklands in the east.

The system was used as a cleaner and more compact alternative to steam engines, to power workshop machinery, lifts, cranes, theatre machinery (including revolving stages at the London Palladium and the London Coliseum, safety curtains at the Theatre Royal, Drury Lane, the lifting mechanism for the cinema organ at the Leicester Square theatre and the complete Palm Court orchestra platform), and the backup mechanism of Tower Bridge. It was also used to supply fire hydrants, mostly those inside buildings. The water, pumped straight from the Thames, was heated in winter to prevent freezing.

== Pumping stations ==
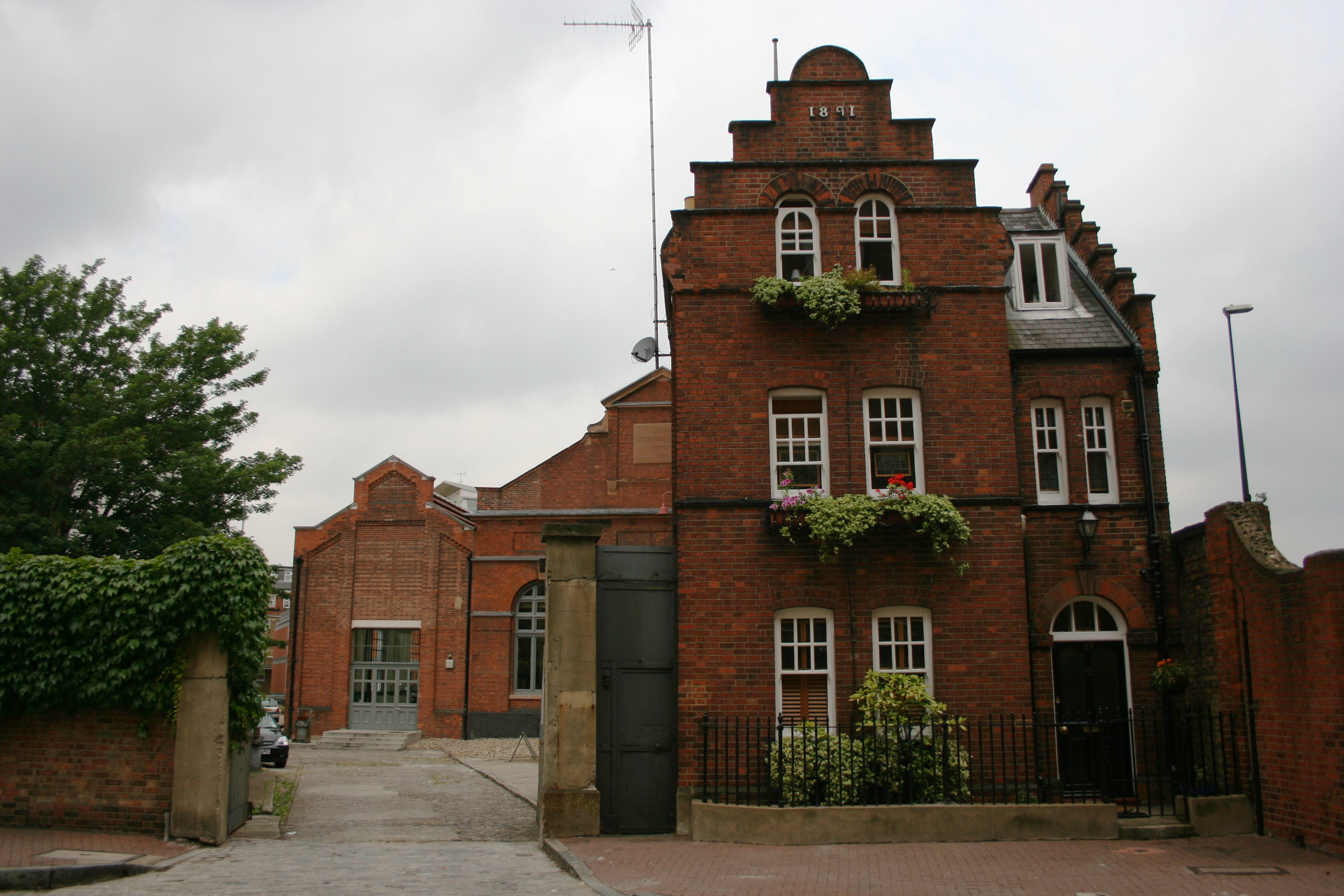
Wapping Hydraulic Power Station

The pressure was maintained at a nominal 800 pounds per square inch (5.5 MPa) (55 bar) by five hydraulic power stations, originally driven by coal-fired steam engines. These were at:

- Falcon Wharf Pumping Station at Bankside, east of Blackfriars Bridge on the south bank of the River Thames (opened in 1883)
- Kensington Court and Millbank (1887) later (1911) replaced by a station in Grosvenor Road
- Wapping Hydraulic Pumping Station (est. 1890), using the defunct Tower Subway to carry pipes under the Thames (closed on 30 June 1977, the last to be used)
- City Road Basin on the Regent's Canal in Islington (1893), later used as the Marico furniture factory
- Renforth Pump House (Rotherhithe, Canada Water) (opened in 1904), now residential accommodation

Short-term storage was provided by hydraulic accumulators, which were large vertical pistons loaded with heavy weights.

== Cross-River Thames mains ==
The mains crossed the River Thames via Vauxhall Bridge, Waterloo Bridge and Southwark Bridge and via the Rotherhithe Tunnel as well as the Tower Subway.

== Decline ==
The system pumped 6.5 million gallons of water each week in 1893; this grew to 32 million gallons in 1933.

From about 1904, business began to decline as electric power became more popular. The company began to replace its steam engines with electric motors from 1923. At its peak, the network consisted of 180 miles (290 km) of pipes, and the total power output was about 7,000 horsepower (5.2 MW).

The system finally closed in June 1977. The company, as a UK statutory authority, had the legal right to dig up the public highways to install and maintain its pipe network. This made it attractive to Mercury Communications (a subsidiary of Cable & Wireless) who bought the company and used the pipes as telecommunications ducts. Wapping Hydraulic Power Station, the last of the five to close, later became an arts centre and restaurant.

== See also ==
- Liverpool Hydraulic Power Company
- Manchester Hydraulic Power
