= Peter W. Barlow =

English civil engineer (1809–1885)

- Born: 1 February 1809; Woolwich, London
- Died: 19 May 1885 (aged 76); London
- Spouse: Bethia Crawford Caffin
- Children: two daughters, one son
- Parent(s): Peter Barlow and ?
- Engineering career
- Discipline: Civil Engineer
- Institutions: Institution of Civil Engineers
- Projects: Lambeth Bridge; Tower Subway
- Significant design: Barlow tunnelling shield

Peter William Barlow (1 February 1809 – 19 May 1885) was an English civil engineer, particularly associated with railways, bridges (he designed the first Lambeth Bridge, a crossing of the River Thames in London), the design of tunnels and the development of tunnelling techniques. In 1864 he patented a design for a cylindrical tunnelling shield, and obtained a provisional patent in 1868 for an improved design.

== Early life ==
Barlow as born at Woolwich, the son of an engineer and mathematician, professor Peter Barlow of the Royal Military Academy, Woolwich. Privately educated, winning a Royal Society of Arts medal in 1824 for his drawing of a transit theodolite; he then became a pupil of the civil engineer, Henry Robinson Palmer whom was a founder member of the Institution of Civil Engineers – of which Barlow became an Associate Member in 1826. Under Palmer, Barlow worked on the Liverpool and Birmingham Canal and the new London Docks.

Barlow contributed to the ICE journal, writing on The strain to which lock gates are subjected in 1836. He also contributed learned papers to the Royal Society.

His brother William Henry Barlow was a noted 19th-century railway engineer.

== Professional career ==
From 1836, Peter Barlow was the resident civil engineer under Sir William Cubitt on parts of the South Eastern Railway, London to Dover line, before taking responsibility for the whole line in 1840, and later becoming Engineer-in-Chief. He was elected a Fellow of the Royal Society in November 1845 as someone who was "Distinguished for his acquaintance with the science of Mathematics as applied to Engineering Subjects". From the 1850s to the 1870s, Barlow was engineer-in-chief to the Newtown and Oswestry, Londonderry and Enniskillen and Londonderry and Coleraine railways; in the mid-1860s he was also consultant engineer to the Finn Valley Railway.

He investigated construction of long-span bridges, writing a paper on the Niagara Falls Suspension Bridge, before becoming the engineer for the first Lambeth Bridge (1860–1862). While designing the piers for this suspension bridge (since replaced by the current structure), Barlow experimented with driving iron cylinders into the shallow London Clay upon which much of central and north London sits.

This experience led him to look at use of cylindrical devices for tunnelling work and in September 1864 he patented a cylindrical tunnelling shield which offered significant differences to the shield used by Marc Isambard Brunel in constructing the Thames Tunnel (1825–1843).

While Barlow held one patent and one pending, he never actually built any of his own shields. James Henry Greathead (Barlow's pupil), independently designed, patented and built the first cylindrical tunnelling shield used on the 11-month construction of the Tower Subway in 1869 and 1870 - the second tunnel under the Thames. Barlow was the engineer with Greathead as the contractor, according to W. C. Copperthwaite in his 1906 book on subaqueous tunnelling. While Greathead built the first European tunnelling shield, Alfred Ely Beach designed and built his own design of shield in New York which closely resembled Barlow's 1864 idea but again, independently. All these men were well acquainted with the Brunels' rectangular shield patent of 1818 and each improved upon the rectangular design in their own ways; in 1869, both Greathead and Beach were the first people to build a cylindrical design for tunnelling shields. The Greathead patent design was a major advance for tunnelling and was different from Barlow's 1864 design; the change from a rectangular to a cylindrical design was an obvious advantage, and "the reduction of the multiplicity of parts in the ... shield to a single rigid unit was of immense advantage and an advance perhaps equal to the shield concept of tunneling itself."

From 1859 to 1867, Barlow lived at No 8 The Paragon, Blackheath, London.

He died at 56 Lansdowne Road, Notting Hill. At the time of his death he was the oldest member of the Institution of Civil Engineers.

== Family ==
In 1836, on 5 July, Peter Barlow married Bethia Crawford Caffin; they had two daughters, and one son, also called Peter William Barlow (who also became a civil engineer and who emigrated to New Zealand in the 1880s).
