= Edward B. Ellington =

British hydraulic engineer (1845–1914)

Edward Bayzand Ellington
- Born: 2 August 1845; Camberwell, London
- Died: 10 November 1914 (aged 69); Kensington, London
- Education: Denmark Hill Grammar School
- Engineering career
- Discipline: Hydraulic engineering
- Institutions: Institution of Mechanical Engineers, Institution of Civil Engineers

Edward Bayzand Ellington (2 August 1845 – 10 November 1914) was a British hydraulic engineer who pioneered the development of urban-scale hydraulic power distribution systems.

Ellington was managing director of the Hydraulic Engineering Co of Chester and one of the founders of the London Hydraulic Power Company. He invented the hydraulic balance lift (US: elevator) and the automatic injector fire hydrant.

== Early life ==
The second son of a warehouseman, Ellington was born in Camberwell, and studied at Denmark Hill Grammar School before being articled to the Greenwich-based maritime engineering firm of John Penn in 1862.

In 1869, he left Penn's company and London and entered into partnership with Bryan Johnson of Chester; Johnson and Ellington specialised in hydraulic machinery. In 1871, they established the Wharves and Warehouses Steam Power and Hydraulic Pressure Company. (Note: Incorporated by the Wharves and Warehouses Steam Power and Hydraulic Pressure Company's Act 1871 (34 and 35 Victoria, c.cxxi).) In 1875, the partnership converted to a limited company, the Hydraulic Engineering Co.

== Hydraulic power ==
Two years later, in 1877, Ellington was engineer to the Hull Hydraulic Power Co., the first company to demonstrate the practicability of large-scale urban hydraulic power networks, in Kingston upon Hull.

In London in 1882, he was consulting engineer to the General Hydraulic Power Company of Southwark (incorporated 29 June), and, in 1884, helped form its subsidiary, the London Hydraulic Power Company, which merged the Wharves and Warehouses Steam Power and Hydraulic Pressure Company and the General Hydraulic Power Company. This was followed by similar UK companies in Liverpool (Liverpool Hydraulic Power Company, 1889), Manchester (Manchester Hydraulic Power, 1894) and Glasgow (1895), plus Australian schemes in Melbourne (1889) and Sydney (1891). The emergence of electrical power during the 20th century meant hydraulic networks were gradually superseded; the Hull company was wound up in 1947 while the final London pumping station ceased operation in 1977.

Late in his life Ellington was elected President of the Institution of Mechanical Engineers. He died at his London home (73 Addison Road, Kensington) on 10 November 1914.

== Family ==
Ellington married Marion Florence Leonard, and they had at least one child, a son, Edward Ellington (born in Kensington in 1877), who became a senior figure in the Royal Air Force.

== Notes and references ==
Professional and academic associations
Preceded by John Aspinall	President of the Institution of Mechanical Engineers; 1911–1912	Succeeded by Sir Frederick Donaldson
