= Power transmission =

Movement of energy from its source to where it can be applied

Power transmission is the movement of energy from its place of generation to a location where it is applied to perform useful work.

Power is defined formally as units of energy per unit time. In SI units:

$$\text{watt} = \frac{\text{joule}}{\text{second}} = \frac{\text{newton}\times\text{meter}}{\text{second}}$$

Since the development of technology, transmission and storage systems have been of immense interest to technologists and technology users.

== Electrical power ==
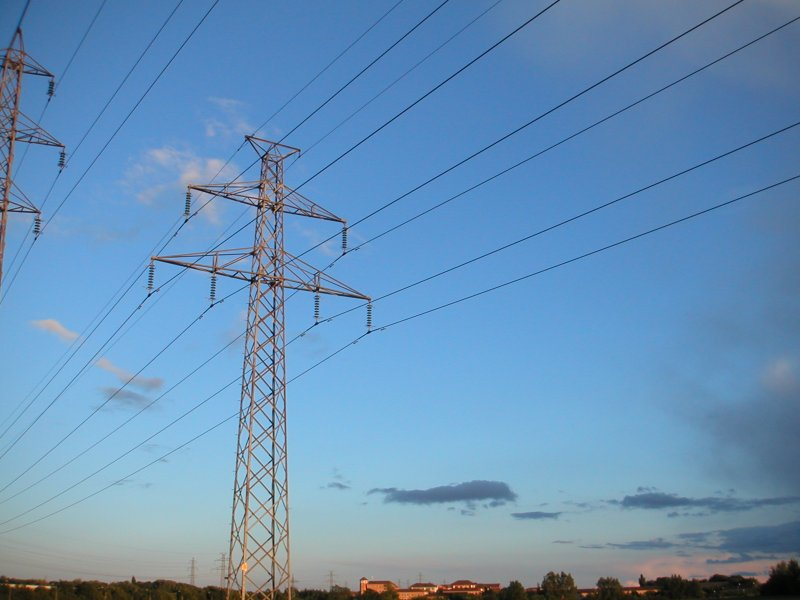
Electric power transmission with overhead line.

With the widespread establishment of electrical grids, power transmission is usually associated most with electric power transmission. Alternating current is normally preferred as its voltage may be easily stepped up by a transformer in order to minimize resistive loss in the conductors used to transmit power over great distances; another set of transformers is required to step it back down to safer or more usable voltage levels at destination.

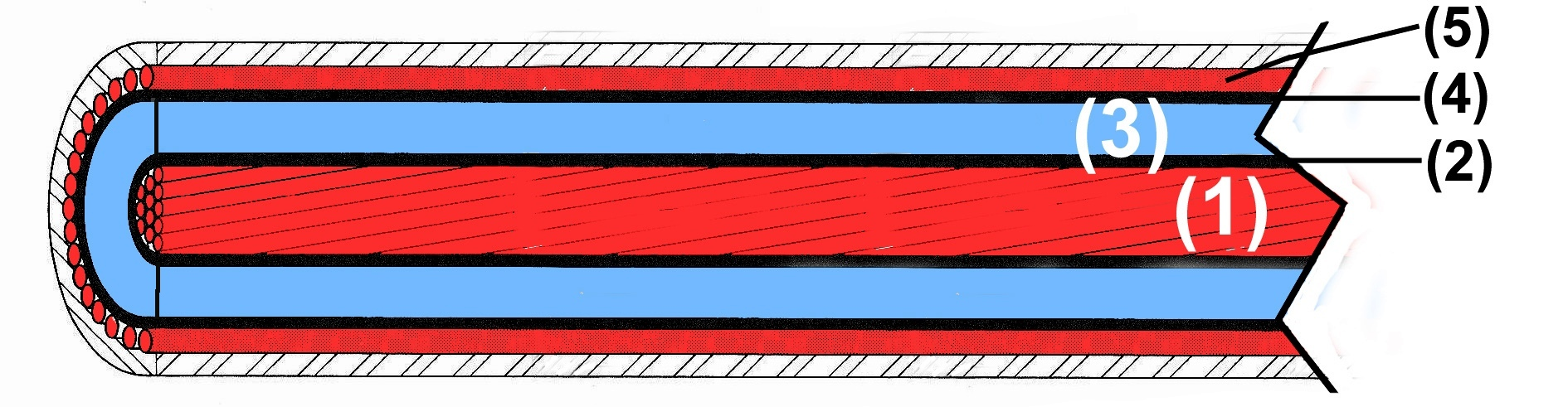
Electric power transmission with underground cable. Here (1) is the conductor for heavy currents and (3) the insulation for high voltages.

Power transmission is usually performed with overhead lines as this is the most economical way to do so. Underground transmission by high-voltage cables is chosen in crowded urban areas and in high-voltage direct-current (HVDC) submarine connections.

Power might also be transmitted by changing electromagnetic fields or by radio waves; microwave energy may be carried efficiently over short distances by a waveguide or in free space via wireless power transfer.

== Mechanical power ==
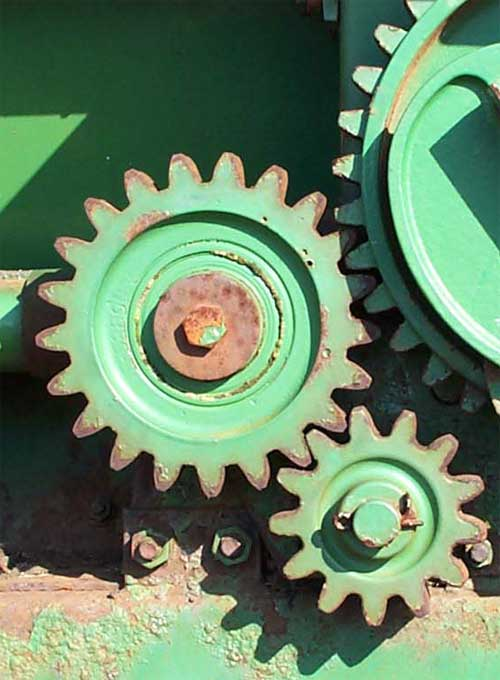
Mechanical power transmission using gears

Electrical power transmission has replaced mechanical power transmission in all but the very shortest distances.

From the 16th century through the Industrial Revolution to the end of the 19th century, mechanical power transmission was the norm. The oldest long-distance power transmission technology involved systems of push-rods or jerker lines (stängenkunst or feldstängen) connecting waterwheels to distant mine-drainage and brine-well pumps. A surviving example from 1780 exists at Bad Kösen that transmits power approximately 200 meters from a waterwheel to a salt well, and from there, an additional 150 meters to a brine evaporator. This technology survived into the 21st century in a handful of oilfields in the US, transmitting power from a central pumping engine to the numerous pump-jacks in the oil field.

Mechanical power may be transmitted directly using a solid structure such as a driveshaft; transmission gears can adjust the amount of torque or force vs. speed in much the same way an electrical transformer adjusts voltage vs current. Factories were fitted with overhead line shafts providing rotary power. Short line-shaft systems were described by Agricola, connecting a waterwheel to numerous ore-processing machines. While the machines described by Agricola used geared connections from the shafts to the machinery, by the 19th century, drivebelts would become the norm for linking individual machines to the line shafts. One mid 19th century factory had 1,948 feet of line shafting with 541 pulleys.

Hydraulic systems use liquid under pressure to transmit power; canals and hydroelectric power generation facilities harness natural water power to lift ships or generate electricity. Pumping water or pushing mass uphill with (windmill pumps) is one possible means of energy storage. London had a hydraulic network powered by five pumping stations operated by the London Hydraulic Power Company, with a total effect of 5 MW.

Pneumatic systems use gasses under pressure to transmit power; compressed air is commonly used to operate pneumatic tools in factories and repair garages. A pneumatic wrench (for instance) is used to remove and install automotive tires far more quickly than could be done with standard manual hand tools. A pneumatic system was proposed by proponents of Edison's direct current as the basis of the power grid. Compressed air generated at Niagara Falls would drive far away generators of DC power. The war of the currents ended with alternating current (AC) as the only means of long distance power transmission.

== Thermal power ==
Thermal power can be transported in pipelines containing a high heat capacity fluid such as oil or water as used in district heating systems, or by physically transporting material items, such as bottle cars, or in the ice trade.

== Chemicals and fuels ==
While not technically power transmission, energy is commonly transported by shipping chemical or nuclear fuels. Possible artificial fuels include radioactive isotopes, wood alcohol, grain alcohol, methane, synthetic gas, hydrogen gas (H_{2}), cryogenic gas, and liquefied natural gas (LNG).

== See also ==
- Distributed generation
- List of energy storage power plants
