= Hydraulic power network =

System of pipes for transmitting power via pressurized liquid

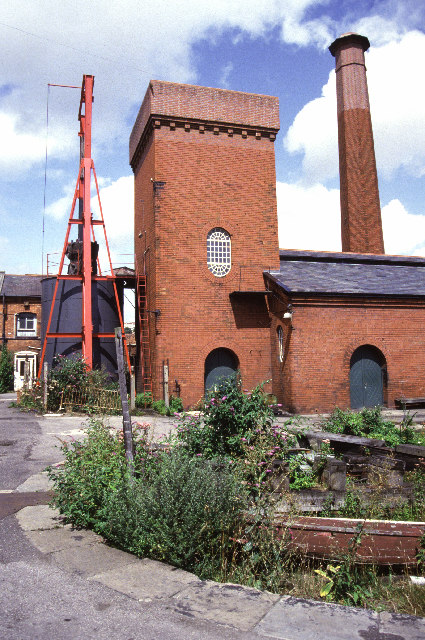
The pumping station and hydraulic accumulator at Bristol Docks

A hydraulic power network is a system of interconnected pipes carrying pressurized liquid used to transmit mechanical power from a power source, like a pump, to hydraulic equipment like lifts or motors. The system is analogous to an electrical grid transmitting power from a generating station to end-users. Only a few hydraulic power transmission networks are still in use; modern hydraulic equipment has a pump built into the machine. In the late 19th century, a hydraulic network might have been used in a factory, with a central steam engine or water turbine driving a pump and a system of high-pressure pipes transmitting power to various machines.

The idea of a public hydraulic power network was suggested by Joseph Bramah in a patent obtained in 1812. William Armstrong began installing systems in England from the 1840s, using low-pressure water, but a breakthrough occurred in 1850 with the introduction of the hydraulic accumulator, which allowed much higher pressures to be used. The first public network, supplying many companies, was constructed in Kingston upon Hull, England. The Hull Hydraulic Power Company began operation in 1877, with Edward B. Ellington as its engineer. Ellington was involved in most of the British networks, and some further afield. Public networks were constructed in Britain at London, Liverpool, Birmingham, Manchester and Glasgow. There were similar networks in Antwerp, Melbourne, Sydney, Buenos Aires and Geneva. All of the public networks had ceased to operate by the mid-1970s, but Bristol Harbour still has an operational system, with an accumulator situated outside the main pumphouse, enabling its operation to be easily visualised.

== History ==
Joseph Bramah, an inventor and locksmith living in London, registered a patent at the London Patent Office on 29 April 1812, which was principally about a provision of a public water supply network, but included a secondary concept for the provision of a high-pressure water main, which would enable workshops to operate machinery. The high-pressure water would be applied "to a variety of other useful purposes, to which the same has never before been so applied". Major components of the system were a ring main, into which a number of pumping stations would pump the water, with pressure being regulated by several air vessels or loaded pistons. Pressure relief valves would protect the system, which he believed could deliver water at a pressure of "a great plurality of atmospheres", and in concept, this was how later hydraulic power systems worked.

In Newcastle upon Tyne, a solicitor called William Armstrong, who had been experimenting with water-powered machines, was working for a firm of solicitors who were appointed to act on behalf of the Whittle Dene Water Company. The water company had been set up to supply Newcastle with drinking water, and Armstrong was appointed secretary at the first meeting of shareholders. Soon afterwards, he wrote to Newcastle Town Council, suggesting that the cranes on the quay should be converted to hydraulic power. He was required to carry out the work at his own expense, but would be rewarded if the conversion was a success. It was, and he set up the Newcastle Cranage Company, which received an order for the conversion of the other four cranes. Further work followed, with the engineer from Liverpool Docks visiting Newcastle and being impressed by a demonstration of the crane's versatility, given by the crane driver John Thorburn, known locally as "Hydraulic Jack".

While the Newcastle system ran on water from the public water supply, the crane installed by Armstrong at Burntisland was not located where such an option was possible, and so he built a 180-foot (55 m) tower, with a water tank at the top, which was filled by a 6 hp (4.5 kW) steam engine. At Elswick in Glasgow, charges by the Corporation Water Department for the water used persuaded the owners that the use of a steam-powered crane would be cheaper. Bramah's concept of "loaded pistons" was introduced in 1850, when the first hydraulic accumulator was installed as part of a scheme for cranes for the Manchester, Sheffield and Lincolnshire Railway. A scheme for cranes at Paddington the following year specified an accumulator with a 10-inch (250 mm) piston and a stroke of 15 feet (4.6 m), which enabled pressures of 600 pounds per square inch (41 bar) to be achieved. Compared to the 80 psi (5.5 bar) of the Newcastle scheme, this increased pressure significantly reduced the volumes of water used. Cranes were not the only application, with hydraulic operation of the dock gates at Swansea reducing the operating time from 15 to two minutes, and the number of men required to operate them from twelve to four. Each of these schemes was for a single customer, and the application of hydraulic power more generally required a new model.

=== Public power in the United Kingdom ===
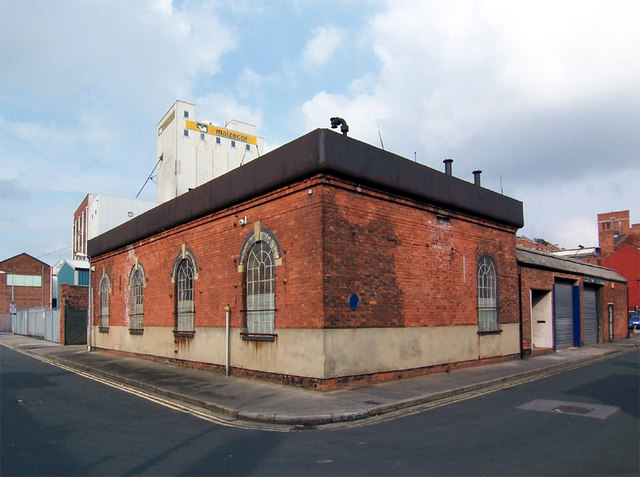
Machell Street hydraulic pumping station in Hull, showing the water settling tank on the roof

==== Kingston upon Hull ====
The first practical installation which supplied hydraulic power to the public was in Kingston upon Hull, in England. The Hull Hydraulic Power Company began operation in 1876. They had 2.5 miles (4.0 km) of pipes, which were up to 6 inches (150 mm) in diameter, and ran along the west bank of the River Hull from Sculcoates bridge to its junction with the Humber. The pumping station was near the north end of the pipeline, on Machell Street, near the disused Scott Street bascule bridge, which was powered hydraulically. There was an accumulator at Machell Street, and another one much nearer the Humber, on the corner of Grimsby Lane. Special provision was made where the pressure main passed under the entrance to Queens Dock. By 1895, pumps rated at 250 hp (190 kW) pumped some 500,000 imperial gallons (2,300 m^{3}) of water into the system each week, and 58 machines were connected to it. The working pressure was 700 psi (48 bar), and the water was used to operate cranes, dock gates, and a variety of other machinery connected with ships and shipbuilding. The Hull system lasted until the 1940s, when the systematic bombing of the city during the Second World War led to the destruction of much of the infrastructure, and the company was wound up in 1947, when Mr F J Haswell, who had been the manager and engineer since 1904, retired.

The man responsible for the Hull system was Edward B. Ellington, who had risen to become the managing director of the Hydraulic Engineering Company, based in Chester, since first joining it in 1869. At the time of its installation, such a scheme seemed like "a leap in the dark", according to R. H. Tweddell writing in 1895, but despite a lack of enthusiasm for the scheme, Ellington pushed ahead and used it as a test bed for both the mechanical and the commercial aspects of the idea. He was eventually involved on some level in most of the hydraulic power networks of Britain. The success of such systems led to them being installed in places as far away as Antwerp in Belgium, Melbourne and Sydney in Australia, and Buenos Aires in Argentina.

Independent hydraulic power networks were also installed at Hull's docks - both the Albert Dock (1869), and Alexandra Dock (1885) installed hydraulic generating stations and accumulators.

==== London ====
The best-known public hydraulic network was the citywide network of the London Hydraulic Power Company. This was formed in 1882, as the General Hydraulic Power Company, with Ellington as the consulting engineer. By the following year another enterprise, the Wharves and Warehouses Steam Power and Hydraulic Pressure Company, had begun to operate, with 7 miles (11 km) of pressure mains on both sides of the River Thames. These supplied cranes, dock gates, and other heavy machinery. Under the terms of the London Hydraulic Power Act 1884 (47 & 48 Vict. c. lxxii), the two companies amalgamated to become the London Hydraulic Power Company. Initially supplying 17.75 million gallons (80.7 megalitres) of high-pressure water each day, this had risen to 1,650 million gallons (7,500 megalitres) by 1927, when the company was powering around 8,000 machines from the supply. They maintained 184 miles (296 km) of mains at 700 psi (48 bar), which covered an area reaching Pentonville in the north, Limehouse in the east, Nine Elms and Bermondsey in the south and Earls Court and Notting Hill in the west.

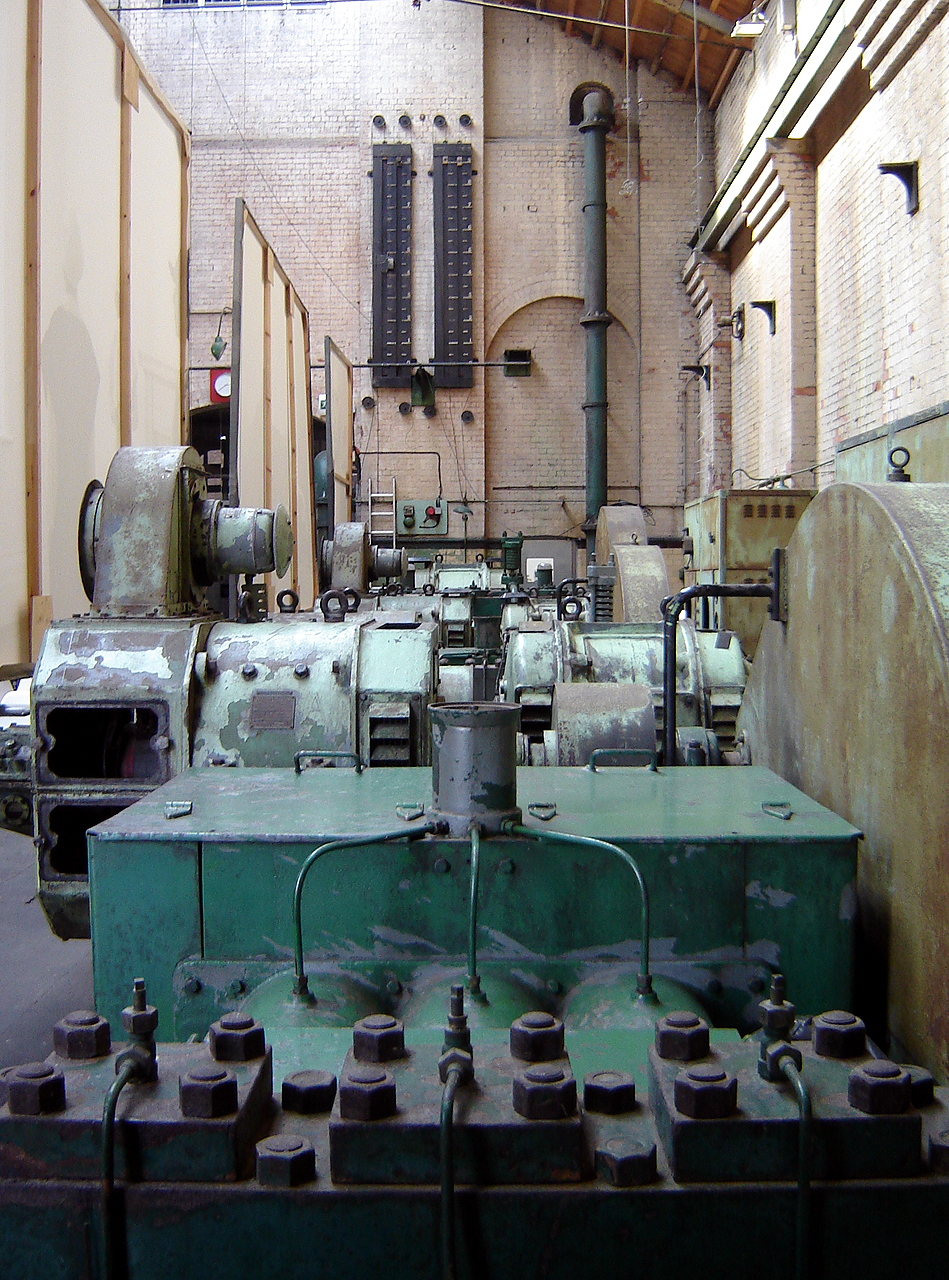
The preserved pumping equipment in Wapping pumping station, which was owned by the London Hydraulic Power Company

Five pumping stations kept the mains pressurised, assisted by accumulators. The original station was at Falcon Wharf, Bankside, but this was replaced by four stations at Wapping, Rotherhithe, Grosvenor Road in Pimlico and City Road in Clerkenwell. A fifth station at East India Docks was originally operated by the Port of London Authority, but was taken over and connected to the system. The stations used steam engines until 1953, when Grosvenor Road station was converted to use electric motors, and following the success of this project, the other four were also converted. The electric motors allowed much smaller accumulators to be used, since they were then only controlling the pressure and flow, rather than storing power. While the network supplied lifts, cranes and dockgates, it also powered the cabaret platform at the Savoy Hotel, and from 1937, the 720-tonne three-section central floor at the Earls Court Exhibition Centre, which could be raised or lowered relative to the main floor to convert between a swimming pool and an exhibition hall. The London system contracted during the Second World War, due to the destruction of customers' machinery and premises. Following the hostilities, large areas of London were reconstructed, and the re-routing of pressure mains was much more difficult than the provision of an electric supply, so that by 1954 the number of machines had fallen to 4,286. The company was wound up in 1977.

==== Liverpool ====
A system began operating in Liverpool in 1888. It was an offshoot of the London-based General Hydraulic Power Company, and was authorised by acts of Parliament obtained in 1884 and 1887. By 1890, some 16 miles (26 km) of mains had been installed, supplied by a pumping station at Athol Street, on the bank of the Leeds and Liverpool Canal. Although water was originally taken from the canal, cleaner water supplied by Liverpool Corporation was in use by 1890, removing the need for a filtration plant. At this time two pumpsets were in use, and a third was being installed. Pressure was maintained by two accumulators, each with an 18-inch (460 mm) diameter piston with a stroke of 20 feet (6.1 m). The Practical Engineer quoted the pressure as 75 pounds per square inch (5.2 bar), but this is unlikely to be correct by comparison with other systems. A second pumping station at Grafton Street was operational by 1909. The system ceased operation in 1971.

==== Birmingham ====
Birmingham obtained its system in 1891, when the Dalton Street hydraulic station opened. In an unusual move, J. W. Gray, the Water Department engineer for the city, had been laying pressure mains beneath the streets for some years, anticipating the need for such a system. The hydraulic station used Otto 'Silent' type gas engines, and had two accumulators, with an 18-inch (460 mm) diameter piston, a stroke of 20 feet (6.1 m) and each loaded with a 93-tonne weight. The gas engines were started by a small hydraulic engine, which used the hydraulic energy stored in the accumulators, and all equipment was supplied by Ellington's company. Very few documents describing the details of the system are known to exist.

==== Manchester and Glasgow ====
The final two public systems in Britain were in Manchester, commissioned in 1894, and Glasgow, commissioned the following year. Both were equipped by Ellington's company, and used the higher pressure of 1,120 psi (77 bar). This was maintained by six sets of triple-expansion steam engines, rated at 200 hp (150 kW) each. Two accumulators with pistons of 18-inch (460 mm) diameter, a stroke of 23 feet (7.0 m), and loaded with 127 tonnes were installed. In Manchester, the hydraulic station was built on the east side of Gloucester Street, by Manchester Oxford Road railway station. It was later supplemented by stations at Water Street and Pott Street, the latter now under the car parks of the Central Retail Park. At its peak in the 1930s, the system consisted on 35 miles (56 km) of pipes, which were connected to 2,400 machines, most of which were used for baling cotton. The system was shut down in 1972. In Glasgow, the pumping station was at the junction of High Street and Rottenrow. By 1899, it was supplying power to 348 machines, and another 39 were in the process of being completed. The pipes were 7 inches (180 mm) in diameter, and there were around 30 miles (48 km) of them by 1909, when 202,141 imperial gallons (918.95 m^{3}) of high pressure water were supplied to customers. The system was shut down in 1964.

=== Systems outside the United Kingdom ===
==== Antwerp ====
All of the British systems were designed to provide power for intermittent processes, such as the operation of dock gates or cranes. The system installed at Antwerp was somewhat different, in that its primary purpose was the production of electricity for lighting. It was commissioned in 1894, and used pumping engines producing a total of 1,000 hp (750 kW) to supply water at 750 psi (52 bar). Ellington, writing in 1895, stated that he found it difficult to see that this was an economical use of hydraulic power, although tests conducted at his works at Chester in October 1894 showed that efficiencies of 59 per cent could be achieved using a Pelton wheel directly coupled to a dynamo.

==== Australia ====
Two major systems were built in Australia. The first was in Melbourne, where the Melbourne Hydraulic Power Company began operating in July 1889. The company was authorised by an Act of the Victorian Parliament passed in December 1887, and construction of the system began, with Coates & Co. acting as consulting engineers, and George Swinburne working as engineering manager. The steam pumping plant was supplied by Abbot & Co. from England. Expansion was rapid, with around 70 machines, mainly hydraulic lifts, connected to the system by the end of 1889, and a third steam engine had to be installed in mid-1890, which more than doubled the capacity of the system. A fourth pumping engine was added in 1891, by which time there were 100 customers connected to the mains. The mains were a mixture of 4-inch (100 mm) and 6-inch (150 mm) pipes. The water was extracted from the Yarra River until 1893, after which it was drawn from the Public Works Department's supply. There were some 16 miles (26 km) of mains by 1897. A second pumping station was added in 1901, and in 1902, 102 million gallons (454 megalitres) of pressurised water were used by customers.

The system was operated as a commercial enterprise until 1925, after which the business and its assets reverted to the City of Melbourne, as specified by the original act. One of the early improvements made by the City Council was to consolidate the system. The steam pumps were replaced by new electric pumps, located in the Spencer Street power station, which thus supplied both electric power and hydraulic power to the city. The hydraulic system continued to operate under municipal ownership until December 1967.

In January 1891, a system in Sydney came on-line, having been authorised by act of Parliament in 1888. George Swinburne was again the engineer, and the system was supplying power to around 200 machines by 1894, which included 149 lifts and 20 dock cranes. The operating company was the Sydney and Suburbs Hydraulic Power Company, later shortened to the Sydney Hydraulic Power Company. Pressure mains were either of 4-inch (100 mm) or 6-inch (150 mm) diameter, and at its peak, there were around 50 miles (80 km) of mains, covering an area between Pyrmont, Woolloomooloo, and Broadway. In 1919, most of the 2369 lifts in the metropolitan area were hydraulically operated. The pumping station, together with two accumulators, was situated in the Darling Harbour district, and the original steam engines were replaced by three electric motors driving centrifugal pumps in 1952. The scheme remained in private ownership until its demise in 1975, and the pumping station has since been re-used as a tavern.

==== Buenos Aires ====
Ellington's system in Buenos Aires was designed to operate a sewage pumping scheme in the city.

==== Geneva ====
Geneva created a public system in 1879, using a 300 hp (220 kW) steam engine installed at the Pont de la Machine to pump water from Lake Geneva, which provided drinking water and a pressurized water supply for the city. The water power was used by about a hundred small workshops having Schmid-type water engines installed. The power of the engines was between 1 and 4 hp (0.75 and 2.98 kW) and the water was supplied at a pressure of 2 to 3 bars (29 to 44 psi).

Due to increased demand, a new pumping plant was installed, which started operation in 1886. The pumps were driven by Jonval turbines using the water power of the river Rhône. This structure was called Usine des Forces Motrices and was one of the largest structures for generation and distribution of power at the time of construction. By 1897 a total of 18 turbines had been installed, with a combined rating of 3.3MW.

The distribution network used three different pressure levels. The drinking water supply used the lowest pressure, while the intermediate and the high pressure mains served as hydraulic power networks. The intermediate pressure mains operated at 6.5 bars (94 psi) and by 1896 some 51 miles (82 km) of pipework had been installed. It was used for powering 130 Schmid type water engines with a gross power of 230 hp (170 kW). The high pressure network had an operating pressure of 14 bars (200 psi) bar and had a total length of 58 miles (93 km). It was used to power 207 turbines and motors, as well as elevator drives, and had a gross power of 3,000 hp (2,200 kW).

Many turbines were used for driving generators for electric lighting. In 1887 an electricity generation plant was built next to the powerhouse, which generated 110 V DC with a maximum power of 800 hp (600 kW) and an AC network with a maximum power of 600 hp (450 kW). The generators were driven by a water turbine supplied from the hydraulic power network. The hydraulic power network was not in competition with the electric power supply, but was seen as a supplement to it, and continued to supply power to many customer until the economic crisis of the 1930s, when the demand for pressurized water as an energy source declined. The last water engine was decommissioned in 1958.

In order to avoid excessive pressure build-up in the hydraulic power network, a release valve was fitted beside the main hall of the powerhouse. A tall water fountain, the Jet d'Eau, was ejected by the device whenever it was activated. This typically happened at the end of the day when the factories switched off their machines, making it hard to control the pressure in the system, and to adjust the supply of pressurized water to match the actual demand. The tall fountain was visible from a great distance and became a landmark in the city. When an engineering solution was found which made the fountain redundant, there was an outcry, and in 1891 it was moved to its current location in the lake, where it operated solely as a tourist attraction, although the water to create it still came from the hydraulic network.

==== New Zealand ====
Two systems were built in New Zealand. The Thames Water Race was built in 1876 to supply water to the Thames goldfields powering stamper batteries, pumps and mine-head lifting equipment. Later, electricity was supplied to the residents of Thames in 1914, and when goldmining ceased the following year, a Francis Turbine and generator made use of the surplus water to generate more electricity for the residents of the town. It was eventually decommissioned in 1946.

The Oamaru Borough Water Race was designed by Donald McLeod (b.1835). It opened in 1880 after 3 years of construction. With water sourced from the Waitaki River, the race stretched nearly 50 km and comprised an intake structure, a stilling pond, 19 aqueducts and six tunnels. The spare horsepower generated water motors, water engines and turbines in the town of Oamaru for decades and operated for 103 years. Much of the race and its components can still be seen today.

== Summary ==
System	Operational	Closed	Pumping stations	Mains (miles)	Mains (km)	Pressure (psi)	Pressure (bar)
Hull	1876	1947	1	2.5	4	700	48
Thames	1876	1946	1	9.6	15.5		
Oamaru	1880	1983	1	26	42		
London	1883	1977	5	184	296	750	52
Liverpool	1888	1971	2	30	48	800	55
Melbourne	1889	1967	2	16	26	750	52
Birmingham	1891		1			700	48
Sydney	1891	1975	1	50	80	750	52
Manchester	1894	1972	3	35	56	1,120	77
Antwerp	1894		1	4.5	7.2	750	52
Glasgow	1895	1964	1	30	48	1,120	77
Geneva	1879	1958	1	109	175	94 / 203	6.5 / 14

== Legacy ==
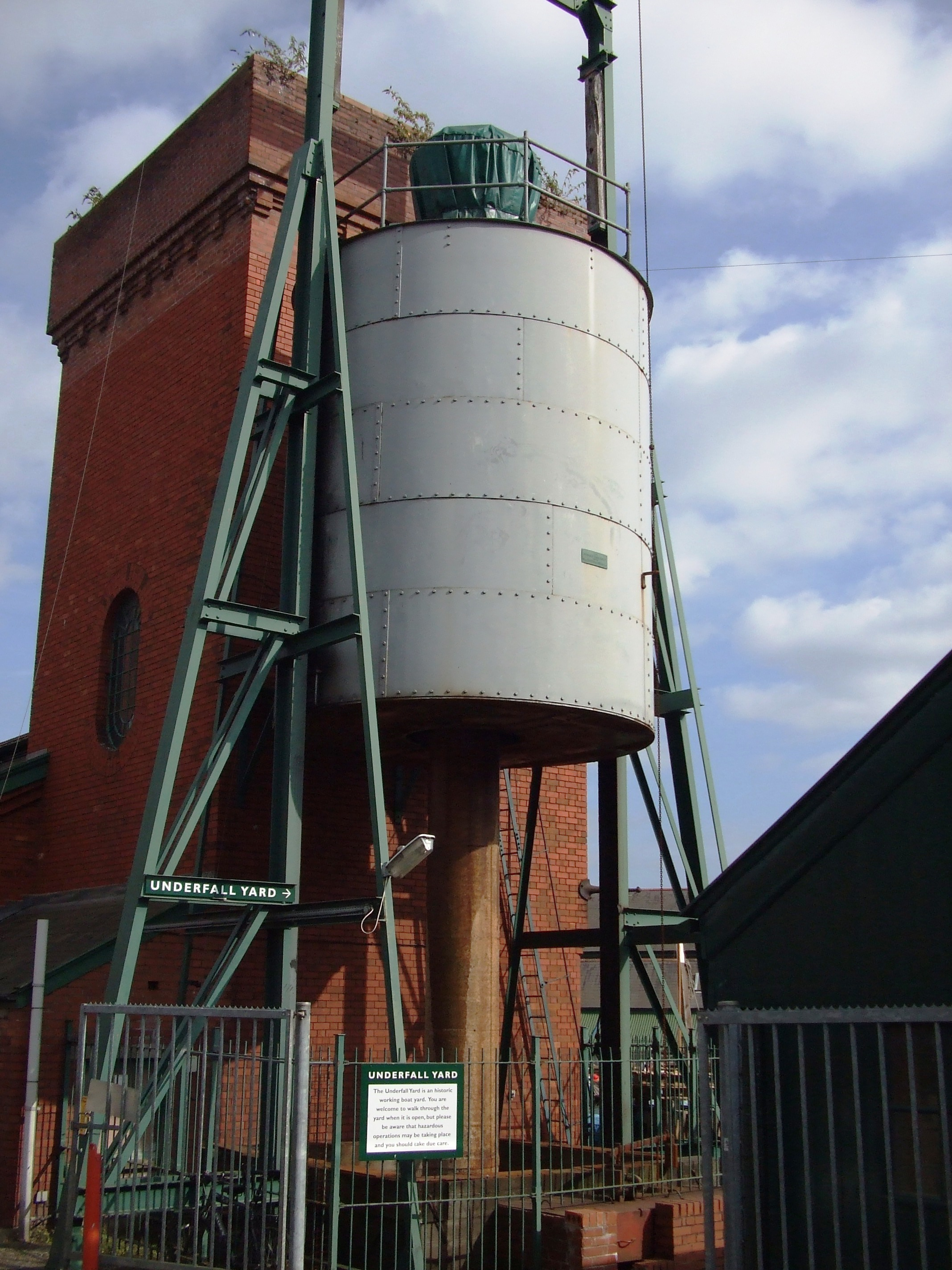
The external hydraulic accumulator at Bristol Harbour

Bristol Harbour still has a working system, the pumping machinery of which was supplied by Fullerton, Hodgart and Barclay of Paisley, Scotland in 1907. The engine house is a grade II* listed building, constructed in 1887, fully commissioned by 1888, with a tower at one end to house the hydraulic accumulator. A second accumulator was fitted outside the building (dated 1954) which enables the operation of the system to be more easily visualised.

A number of artefacts, including the buildings used as pumping stations, have survived the demise of public hydraulic power networks. In Hull, the Machell Street pumping station has been reused as a workshop. The building still supports the sectional cast-iron roof tank used to allow the silt-laden water of the River Hull to settle, and is marked by a Blue plaque, to commemorate its importance. In London, Bermondsey pumping station, built in 1902, is in use as an engineering works, but retains its chimney and accumulator tower, while the station at Wapping is virtually complete, retaining all of its equipment, which is still in working order. The building is grade II* listed because of its completeness.

In Manchester, the Water Street pumping station, built in Baroque style between 1907 and 1909, was used as workshops for the City College, but has formed part of the People's History Museum since 1994. One of the pumping sets has been moved to the Museum of Science and Industry, where it has been restored to working order and forms part of a larger display about hydraulic power. The pumps were made by the Manchester firm of Galloways.

Geneva still has its Jet d'Eau fountain, but since 1951 it has been powered by a partially submerged pumping station, which uses water from the lake rather than the city water supply. Two Sulzer pumps, named Jura and Salève, create a fountain which rises to a height of 460 feet (140 m) above the surface of the lake.

== See also ==
- Power transmission
- Pumped-storage hydroelectricity
- Pneumatic tube

== Bibliography ==
- Cross-Rudkin, Peter; et al. (2008). A Biographical Dictionary of Civil Engineers in Great Britain and Ireland: Vol 2: 1830 to 1890. Thomas Telford. ISBN 978-0-7277-3504-1.
- Ducluzaux, André (1 January 2002). "Transporter l'énergie hydraulique à distance, avant l'électricité (1830–1890)". La Houille Blanche. 4–5 (4–5): 28–33. Bibcode:2002LHBl...88...28D. doi:10.1051/lhb/2002054. S2CID 109585461.
- Field, Corinne (16 August 2004). "Pump Up The Volume - Manchester Hydraulic Heritage". Culture 24.
- Gibson, J W; Pierce, M C (2009). "Remnants of Early Hydraulic Power Systems" (PDF). 3rd Australasian Engineering Heritage Conference. Archived from the original (PDF) on 27 September 2011.
- Graces Guide (1891). "The Practical Engineer, Volume V". Technical Publishing Company.
- HSC online (1999). "Engineering Studies - Hydraulic Power". Charles Sturt University. Archived from the original on 16 April 2014.
- McNeill, Ian (1972). Hydraulic Power. Longman Group. ISBN 978-0-582-12797-5.
- Pierce, Miles (2006). "The Melbourne Hydraulic Power Company". Engineering Heritage Australia (Victoria). Archived from the original on 13 October 2012.
- Pierce, Miles (December 2008). "The Melbourne Hydraulic Power Company". Newsletter 21, Engineering Heritage Australia. Archived from the original on 26 July 2011.
- Pugh, B (1980). The Hydraulic Age. Mechanical Engineering Publications. ISBN 978-0-85298-447-5.
- Tissot, Tatiana (23 November 2017). "The story of Geneva's Jet d'Eau". House of Switzerland.

=== Literature ===
- Ellington, E.B. (20 March 1885), "Recent Progress in the public supply of hydraulic power" (PDF), The Engineer, 59: 232–3, From a paper read before the Liverpool Engineering Society, 28 January 1885
- Hull system
  - Robinson, H. (1877), "The Transmission of Power to Distances. (Includes Plate and Appendix)", Minutes of the Proceedings of the Institution of Civil Engineers, 49 (1877), Institution of Civil Engineers: 1–29, doi:10.1680/imotp.1877.22499
- London system
  - Ellington, E. B. (1888), "The Distribution of Hydraulic Power in London. (Includes Plates and Appendices)", Minutes of the Proceedings of the Institution of Civil Engineers, 94 (1888), Institution of Civil Engineers: 1–31, doi:10.1680/imotp.1888.20879
  - "The London Hydraulic Power Company" (PDF), The Engineer, 75: 43–48, 51, 54, 20 January 1893
