= James Henry Greathead =

English mechanical and civil engineer (1844–1896)

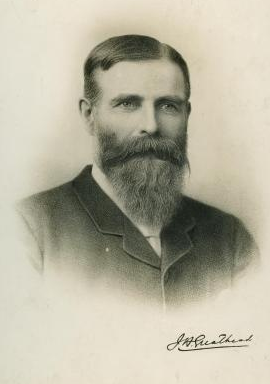
- Born: 6 August 1844; Grahamstown, South Africa
- Died: 21 October 1896 (aged 52); Streatham, London, England
- Education: St Andrews College, Diocesan College, Grahamstown, Cape Town, South Africa; in 1859 he came to Westbourne Collegiate, part of King's College, London.
- Spouse: Blanche Emily Caldecott Coryndon
- Children: 4
- Engineering career
- Discipline: Mechanical Engineering, Civil Engineer
- Institutions: Institution of Mechanical Engineering, Institution of Civil Engineers
- Practice name: Chief Engineer for City and South London Railways
- Projects: Tower Subway; Blackwall Tunnel; Waterloo & City line Liverpool Overhead Railway
- Significant design: Greathead Shield, Greathead grouting machine, injector hydrant and other patented designs
- Awards: Elected to the Council of the Institution of Civil Engineers, 1884

James Henry Greathead (6 August 1844 – 21 October 1896) was an English mechanical and civil engineer renowned for his work on the London Underground railways, Winchester Cathedral, and the Liverpool Overhead Railway, as well as being one of the earliest proponents of the English Channel, Irish Sea and Bristol Channel tunnels. His invention is also the reason that the London Underground is colloquially named the "Tube".

== Early life ==
Greathead was born in Grahamstown, South Africa; of English descent, his grandfather had emigrated to South Africa in 1820. He was educated at St. Andrew's College, Grahamstown, and the Diocesan College private school in Cape Town. After emigrating to England in 1859, he completed his education from 1859 to 1863 at the Westbourne Collegiate School, Westbourne Grove.

He returned briefly to South Africa before finally moving to London in 1864 to serve a three-year pupillage under the civil engineer Peter W. Barlow, from whom he became acquainted with the rectangular shield system of tunnelling. Greathead spent some time (around 1867) as assistant engineer on the Midland Railway between Bedford and London (working with Barlow's brother, William Henry Barlow).

== Tunnelling ==
Soon after, in 1869, he rejoined Barlow and they began work on designs for the Tower Subway, only the second tunnel to be driven under the river Thames in central London. Barlow was the engineer for the tunnel and Greathead was in charge of the actual drive.

Greathead became the main contractor for the Tower subway under Barlow. William Copperthwaite asserts that whilst Barlow had patented a tunnelling shield idea, Greathead not only designed a different type of shield but patented it and used it on that contract. Barlow had been awarded a provisional patent on his second idea but Greathead was unaware of this until several years later (as discussed in minutes of a meeting of the Institution of Civil Engineers (ICE) published in January 1896).

Greathead was the Blackwall Tunnel consulting engineer and oversaw its design and construction.

== Railways ==
In 1873 Greathead became resident engineer on the Hammersmith extension railway and the Richmond extension of the District Railway, a post which he held for four years. After this he assisted in the preparation of the Regents Canal Railway (1880), the Metropolitan Outer Circle Railway (1881), a new London–Eastbourne line (1883) and in various light railways in Ireland (1884).

Also in 1884, Greathead resumed his involvement in tunnelling, being engaged as engineer on the London (City) & Southwark Subway, later the City & South London Railway (and now part of the Northern line) which was, when it opened in 1890, the world's first underground electric railway. In 1888, he became joint engineer with Sir Douglas Fox on the Liverpool Overhead Railway and also worked with W. R. Galbraith on the Waterloo & City Railway. His final work was on the Central London Railway with Sir John Fowler and Sir Benjamin Baker.

== Inventions and patents ==
=== Greathead Shield ===
This possibly derived from Marc Isambard Brunel's original patented 1818 idea and erroneously was accorded by Robert Vogel to have been inspired by Barlow's 1864 patent that led to Barlow's 1868 provisional patent. However, there were considerable design differences that make Greathead's patented designs distinguishable from Brunel's provisional patent idea, allowing a patent application for Greathead's design.

Brunel's shield was rectangular and comprised 12 separate, independently moveable frames; the Greathead solution was cylindrical, and the "reduction of the multiplicity of parts in the Brunel shield to a single rigid unit was of immense advantage and an advance perhaps equal to the shield concept of tunneling itself", though the face was still dug out by manual labour to begin with. Greathead's patented Shield for Tunnelling Soft Earth used water jets under pressure at the tunnel face to assist in cutting through soft earth as described in the patent. Pneumatic tunnel pressurisation was used to ensure better safety for workers by equalising internal tunnel pressure to its estimated exterior underground pressure beneath water.

The 'second edition' of his shield used hydraulic action at the face along with cutting teeth to create slurry (this slurry then hardened upon drying and led to his next invention: the Greathead Grouting Machine). Brunel may be credited for the idea of using a shield, but Greathead was recognised first as the English engineer who built one of his own design and granted a patent of the one-piece cylindrical shield. Greathead designed the prototype circular shield that has since been used in most tunnelling projects, with other engineers' advancement and technological improvement in the general shield design. In his book, Tunnel Shields and the Use of Compressed Air in Subaqueous Works, Copperthwaite (who worked under Greathead as his pupil) says:

Barlow was certainly the first to patent, in 1864, a shield capable of motion in one piece, and surrounded by a thin cylinder of iron... to build, in successive rings, a cast iron tunnel... this was in 1864 and in 1868 he provisionally patented a shield... neither of these designs took practical form and, in 1869 Greathead in England and Beach in New York actually built and used shields having many features in common with Barlow's patents but differing from each other in details.

Copperthwaite also argues (p. 20) that all three men, Barlow, Greathead and Beach, designed their tunnelling shields independently of each other. There is evidence that Greathead was unaware until 1895 of Barlow's 1868 provisional patent, which his shield resembled the most; Beach's shield more closely resembled Barlow's 1864 patent. Copperthwaite adds: "the exact apportionment of the credit of the invention between these two will be decided by each reader according as he may consider the inventor, the inventor of a new mechanism, or the man who applies it practical use, the more deserving of credit." Whilst Barlow patented his idea in 1864, in 1869 both Greathead in England and Beach in New York practically simultaneously constructed their own shields that were similar but independent of each other. Greathead's achievements went further than any other engineers' tunnelling with the additional patents of 1738 (1874), 5665 (1884) and, in 1886 his patent no. 5221: grouting by means of compressed air.

Copperthwaite clarifies the origins of the shift in thinking from a rectangular tunnel shield to cylindrical cutting shields as first built by Greathead. Minutes in the ICE library suggest Barlow quietly patented his ideas for a cylindrical cutting shield but never built one. Greathead, unaware of Barlow's initial patent and succeeding provisional patent, went on to design, patent and build the credited first cylindrical tunnelling shield in history. Simultaneously, Alfred Ely Beach built a cylindrical tunnelling shield in New York and designed a shield that very closely resembled Barlow's patented idea around the same time as Greathead. According to a 2017 video lecture given by Professor Lord Mair for the ICE, the Brunels' shield ideas were well known in both USA and UK. Since Barlow was a Brunel pupil, he was likely well acquainted with the rectangular tunnelling shield design.

It must have been obvious that a cylindrical design was far more suitable and stable which led to three famous men independently designing their own unique tunneling shields within a few years of each other. Since Portland cement had only been invented in 1824 by Joseph Aspdin of Leeds, it was not fully appreciated by the construction industry for many years. It was only because of Portland cement's hydraulic properties and ability to set in wet environments that these first tunnel ventures under the Thames came to fruition at all. Beach never came to England to learn of Barlow's patent and later provisional patent, and Greathead did not know about Barlow's provisional patent idea until 1895 when it was discussed in the Institution of Civil Engineers meeting attended by Greathead shortly after Barlow's death and shortly before his own death. The documents may be obtained by request from their library in pdf format for further clarification.

The Greathead shield consisted of an iron cylinder 7 ft 3 in (2.21 m) in diameter fitted with screw jacks which enabled it to be jacked forward. In use, the shield was inched forward as the working face was excavated, while behind it a permanent tunnel lining of cast iron segments was fitted into place, itself an important innovation. Greathead patented many of his ideas including the use of compressed air and forward propulsion by hydraulic jacks, both of which are now standard features of tunnel construction. Another patent by Greathead was the addition of the grouting pan at ceiling height that allowed cement grout to be applied hydraulically behind the vast cast iron shields to stabilise the tunnel wall outside the shield sections. A third tunnelling shield was patented by Greathead that introduced hydraulic pressure nozzles at the tunnel face to blast away soft earth. The nozzle itself was also another Greathead patent invention. At some point Greathead discovered that concrete could be sprayed onto earthen surfaces to stabilise them and became the father of shot concrete and spray cement used so extensively in construction.

=== Greathead Injector Hydrant (c. 1879) ===
The hydrant was an invention to inject grouting behind cast iron tunnelling shield cavities to strengthen tunnel wall linings during construction with a permanent position.

=== Greathead Grouting Machine ===
This is mentioned in relation to the repair of Winchester Cathedral and Lincoln Cathedral. "His system of grouting by means of compressed air, which perhaps more than any other invention has proved indispensable in all recent tunnel work."

=== Patents ===
- 1738 of 1874 J. H. Greathead a shield having a closed face, the soil in front of which is to be disintegrated by water jets, and by protruding tools. The tunnel to be lined with cast iron, or with moulded artificial blocks. Grouting to be injected behind the tunnel lining.
- 5665 of 1884 J. H. Greathead the same shield but with modifications.
- 5221 of 1886 J. H. Greathead The grouting pan. A shield similar to those of patents 1738 (1874) & 5665 (1884)
- 13215 of 1886 J. H. Greathead A shield with alternatively, a central rotary cutter, with wedges for breaking down the face, washing out pipes, and wedges only, etc.
- 195 of 1889 J. H. Greathead A shield with a revolving cutter.
- 9263 of 1894 J. H. Greathead and Basil Mott Improvements in bogies for railway rolling stock.

== Honours ==
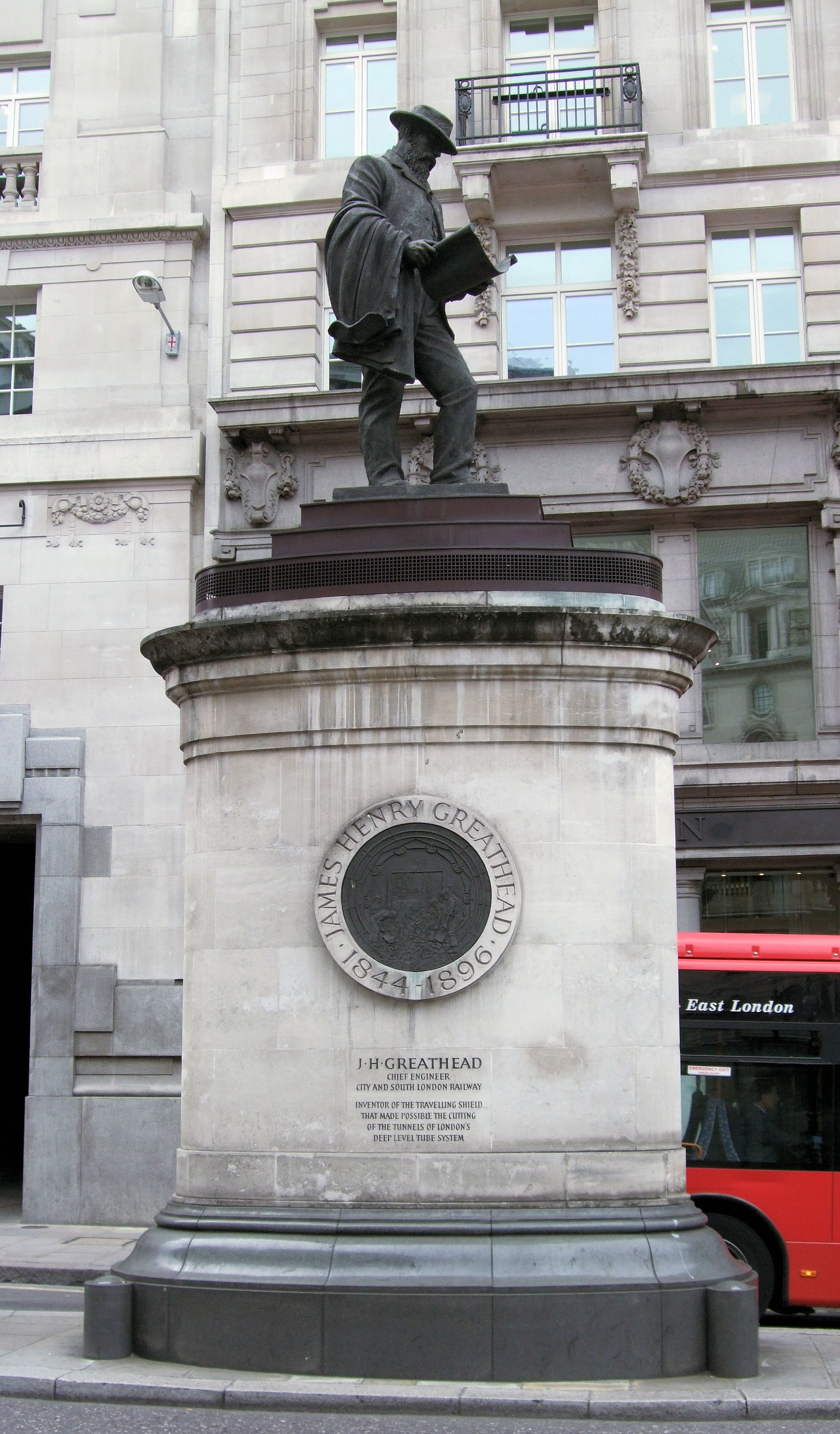
Greathead's statue in the City of London

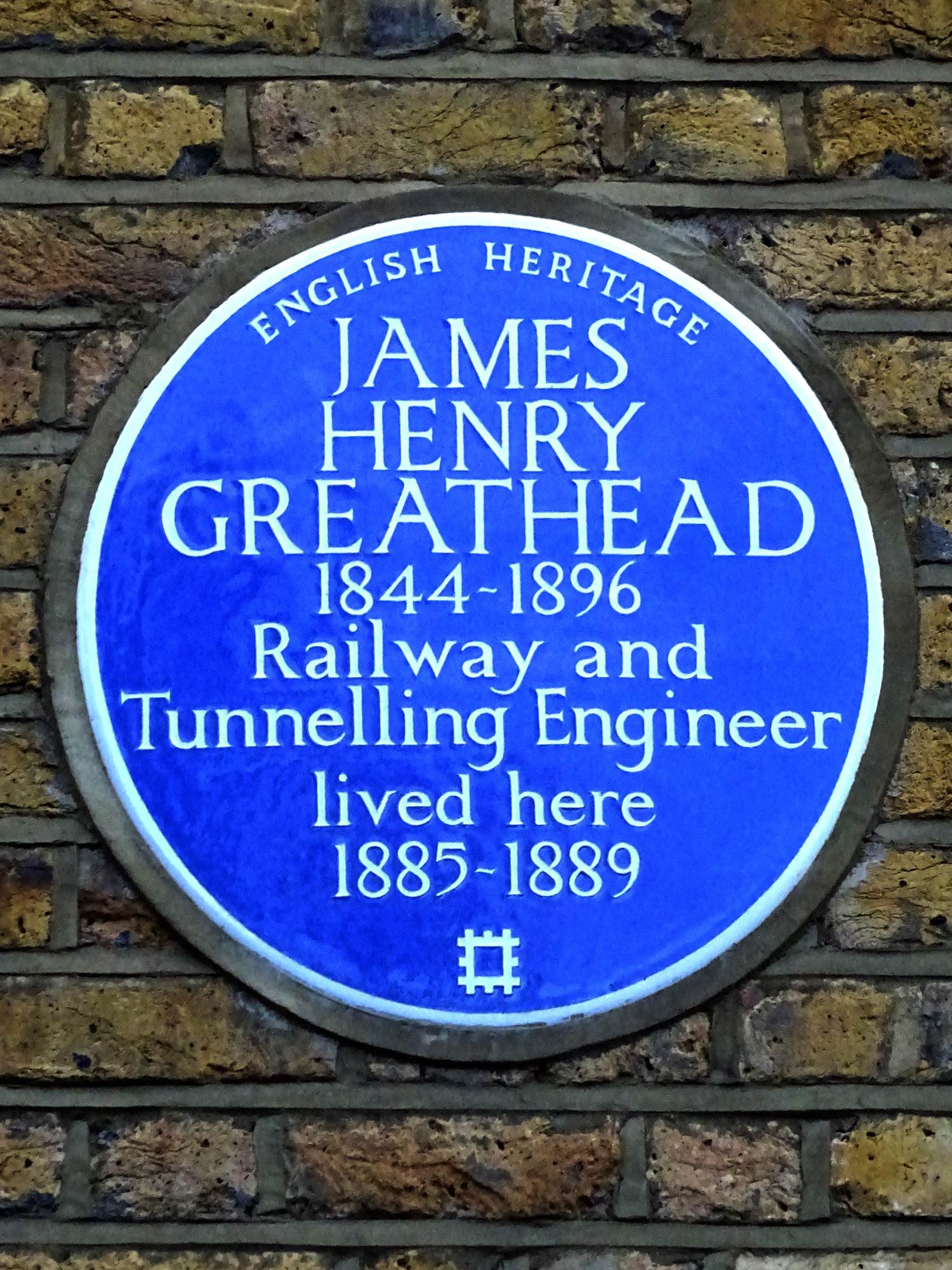
Blue Plaque at 3 St Mary's Grove

- An English Heritage blue plaque marks his home in Barnes, south-west London, 3 St Mary's Grove, where he lived between 1885 and 1889. This was his third home as his second residence had been demolished prior to placement of the English Heritage plaque.
- In January 1994 a statue of Greathead was erected outside the Bank station next to the Royal Exchange in the City of London. It was unveiled by the Lord Mayor of London and is positioned on a plinth which hides a ventilation shaft for the Underground.
- While Bank Station was being refurbished a section of the Greathead shield was discovered in a passageway between the Underground and the Waterloo and City Railway. The section has been painted red and a brass plate erected as a further memorial to his achievements.

== Bibliography ==
- Cartwright, Rob (2021). JAMES HENRY GREATHEAD New 2021 Biography.
- Copperthwaite, William (1906). Tunnel shields and the use of compressed air in subaqueous works (With 260 illustrations and diagrams.) (1 ed.). New York: Van Nostrand Co.
- Laurie, K. W. J. (1914). Register of S. Andrew's College, Grahamstown, from 1855 to 1914. Grahamstown: Slater & Co.
- Taylor, Sheila; Green, Oliver (2001). The Moving Metropolis: The History of London's Transport Since 1800. Laurence King. ISBN 978-3-8238-5486-9.
- Vogel, Robert M. (1966). Tunnel Engineering – a Museum Treatment. Washington, D.C.: Smithsonian Institution.
- Wallace, Sir Donald Mackenzie; Arthur T. Hadley; Hugh Chisholm, eds. (1902). "Greathead, James Henry". The New Volumes of the Encyclopædia Britannica. Vol. V, forming volume XXIX of the complete work (10th ed.). New York: The Encyclopædia Britannica Company.
- West, Graham (2005). Innovation and the Rise of the Tunnelling Industry. Cambridge University Press. ISBN 978-0-521-67335-8.
