= Blackfriars station =

London Underground and railway station

Blackfriars
- London Blackfriars
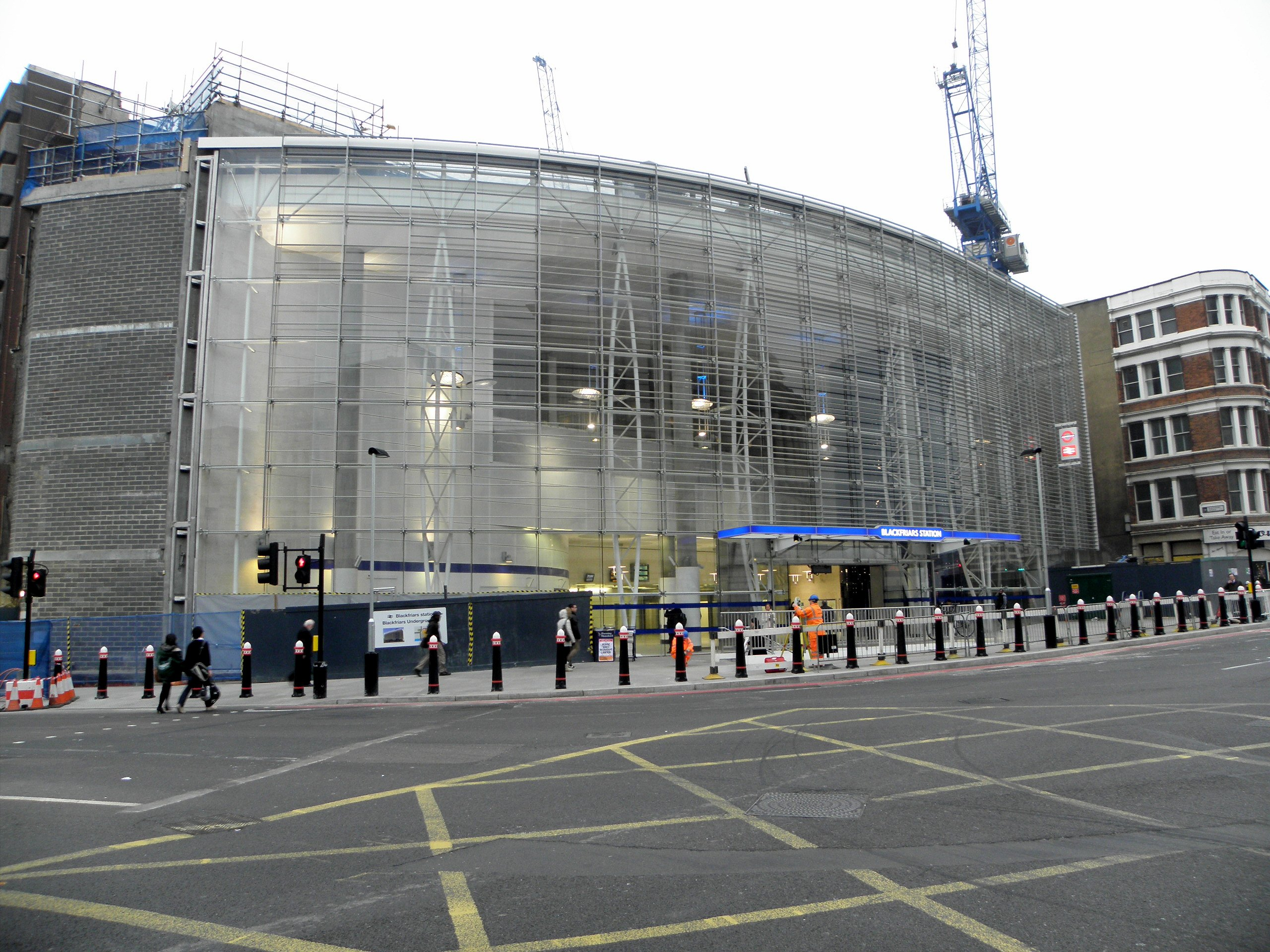
- Northern entrance on Queen Victoria Street after renovation in 2012
- Interactive map of Blackfriars

General information
- Location: Blackfriars, Castle Baynard
- Local authority: City of London
- Managed by: Thameslink; London Underground
- Owner: Network Rail; Transport for London
- Station code: BFR
- DfT category: A
- Number of platforms: 4 National Rail; 2 London Underground
- Accessible: Yes
- Fare zone: 1
- OSI: Southwark (Bankside exit); Blackfriars Millennium Pier

London Underground annual entry and exit
- 2021: ▲4.80 million
- 2022: ▲9.41 million
- 2023: ▲9.95 million
- 2024: ▲10.67 million
- 2025: ▼10.71 million

National Rail annual entry and exit
- 2020–21: ▼2.100 million
- Interchange: ▼0.581 million
- 2021–22: ▲5.982 million
- Interchange: ▲1.500 million
- 2022–23: ▲12.905 million
- Interchange: ▲7.722 million
- 2023–24: ▲13.946 million
- Interchange: ▼2.193 million
- 2024–25: ▲15.193 million
- Interchange: ▲2.235 million

Railway companies
- Original company: London, Chatham and Dover Railway

Key dates
- 10 May 1886: Opened as St. Paul's (LC&DR)
- 30 May 1870: Opened (MDR)
- 1 February 1937: Renamed as Blackfriars
- 1971–1977: First rebuild
- 2009–2012: Second rebuild, partial resite

Other information
- External links: TfL station info page; Departures; Facilities
- Coordinates: 51.5116°N 0.1030°W

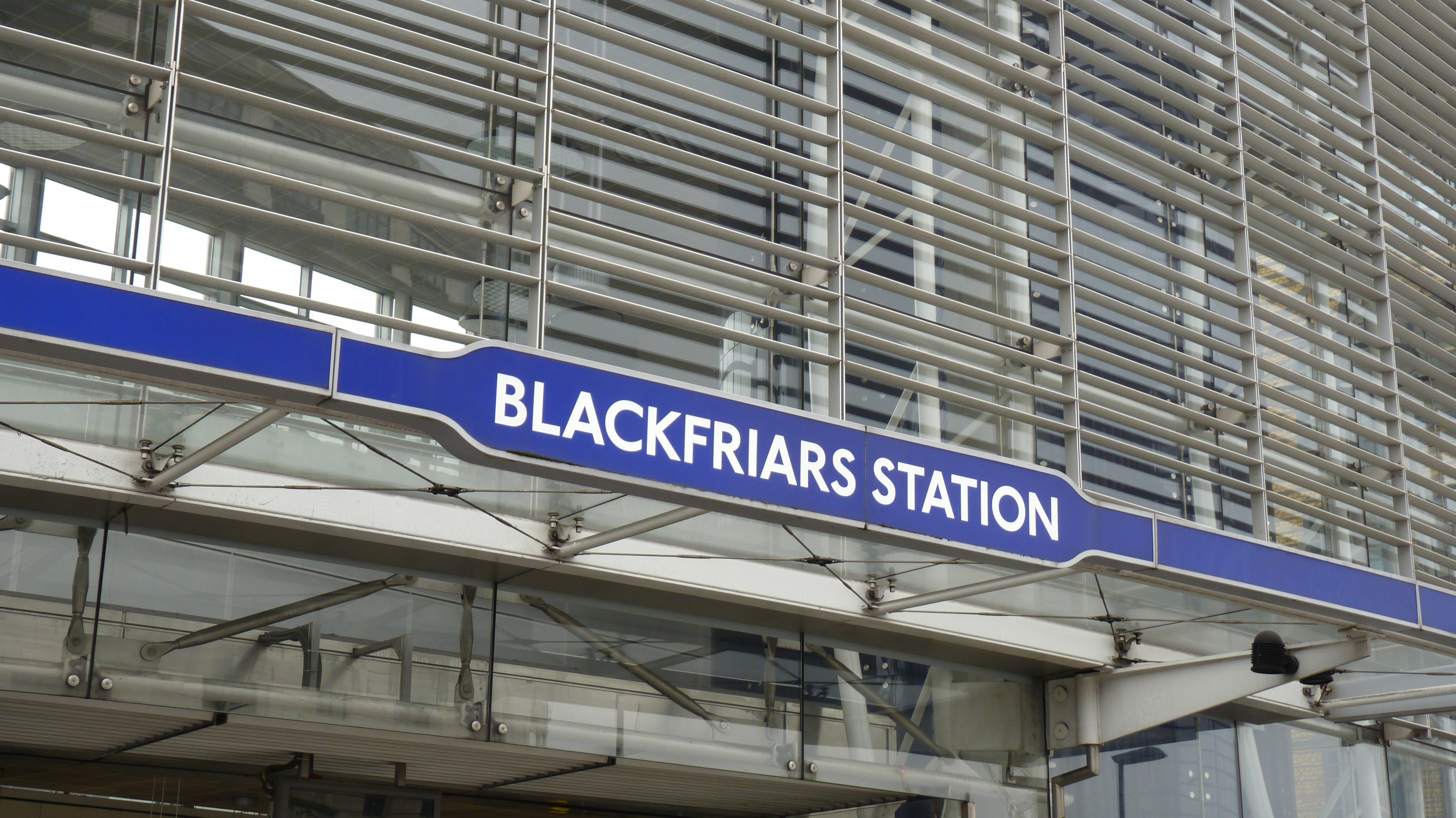

Blackfriars (/ˈblækˌfraɪərz/), also known as London Blackfriars, is a central London railway station and connected London Underground station in the City of London. It provides Thameslink services: local (from North to South London), and regional (Bedford and Cambridge to Brighton) and limited Southeastern commuter services to South East London and Kent. Its platforms span the River Thames, the only station in London to do so, along the length of Blackfriars Railway Bridge, a short distance downstream from Blackfriars Bridge. There are two station entrances – one on each side of the Thames – along with a connection to the London Underground District and Circle lines.

The main line station was opened by the London, Chatham and Dover Railway with the name St. Paul's in 1886, as a replacement for the earlier Blackfriars Bridge station (now the present station's southern entrance) and the earlier Blackfriars railway bridge. This increased capacity of rail traffic through the Snow Hill tunnel to the rest of the rail network. The Underground station opened in 1870 with the arrival of the Metropolitan District Railway. The station was renamed Blackfriars in 1937 to avoid confusion with St Paul's tube station. It was rebuilt in the 1970s, which included the addition of office space above the station and the closure of the original railway bridge, which was demolished in 1985.

In 2009, the station underwent major refurbishments to improve capacity, which included the extension of the platforms across the railway bridge and a new station entrance on the South Bank. The underground station was rebuilt at the same time, and work was completed in 2012.

== Location ==
Blackfriars station (Note: The station is formally called "London Blackfriars" in official railway documentation.) serves Thameslink rail services that connect suburbs with central London. It straddles the River Thames, running across the length of Blackfriars Railway Bridge parallel to the A201 Blackfriars Bridge. For this reason, it is partly in the City of London and partly in the London Borough of Southwark. The north bank entrance is on the south side of Queen Victoria Street and the south bank entrance, opened in 2011, is adjacent to Blackfriars Road.

The station falls within London fare zone 1. The station is run by Thameslink, with Transport for London handling the underground platforms. A Thameslink driver depot is in the station building. The adjacent Blackfriars Millennium Pier provides river services to Putney and Canary Wharf.

London Buses routes 4, 40, 63 and night routes N63 and N89 serve the station.

== History ==
=== London, Chatham and Dover Railway ===
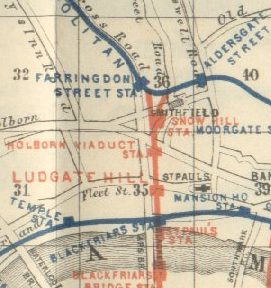
Early 20th century map showing Blackfriars station, then called St Paul's, and Blackfriars Bridge station south of the river, alongside Ludgate Hill and Holborn Viaduct

The station was proposed by the London, Chatham and Dover Railway (LC&DR), who had been given parliamentary power to build a line into the City of London. The company wanted to compete with rivals, the South Eastern Railway, and provide the best service into Central London. The line was complete as far as the Thames by 1864; the LC&DR opened Blackfriars Bridge station on 1 June, which sat on the south bank adjacent to Blackfriars Road. The station was constructed on two levels, with a goods depot at street level and passenger facilities level with the bridge. An underground station at Blackfriars north of the river was opened by the Metropolitan District Railway in 1870, before any mainline stations.

The railway bridge across the Thames was delayed because the City's municipal body, the Corporation of London, was unsure as to what it should look like and how many arches there should be. The station was designed by Joseph Cubitt and had a long roof with walls that stretched up to the riverbank. Cubitt subsequently designed the original bridge, which carried four tracks on a 933 feet (284 m) lattice girder bridge, supported by sets of stone piers supporting iron columns. Services began across the bridge on 21 December 1864. Upon completion, trains ended at a temporary terminal, replaced by Ludgate Hill on 1 June 1865. A further station, Holborn Viaduct, opened on 2 March 1874 and the LC&DR line ran via the Snow Hill tunnel to a connection to the Metropolitan Railway near Farringdon, then on to King's Cross and St Pancras stations.

The mainline Blackfriars station was opened by the LC&DR as St. Paul's railway station on 10 May 1886 when the company opened the St. Paul's Railway Bridge across the Thames. The new bridge and station were built as a supplement to, rather than a replacement for, the first bridge because of increasing railway traffic. The joint engineers for the works were William Mills of the London, Chatham, and Dover Company, and Messrs. John Wolfe Barry and Henry Marc Brunel. Edward Cruttwell was the resident engineer in charge of construction. The bridge was constructed parallel to the 1864 Blackfriars Railway Bridge, carrying seven tracks across five arched spans between 175 feet (53 m) and 185 feet (56 m) high. It widened past the bridge to the terminus on the south side of Queen Victoria Street. The original station was a small and cheaply designed pink-red brick building, as the LC&DR had financial difficulties throughout its lifetime attempting to drive a railway through Central London. The station's frontage backed onto the District Railway, making cab access and a forecourt impossible owing to lack of space. It did, however, allow St Paul's a direct interchange with the rest of the underground, unlike all the other LC&DR stations. On 13 November 1886, a direct connection was made between the mainline and underground stations.

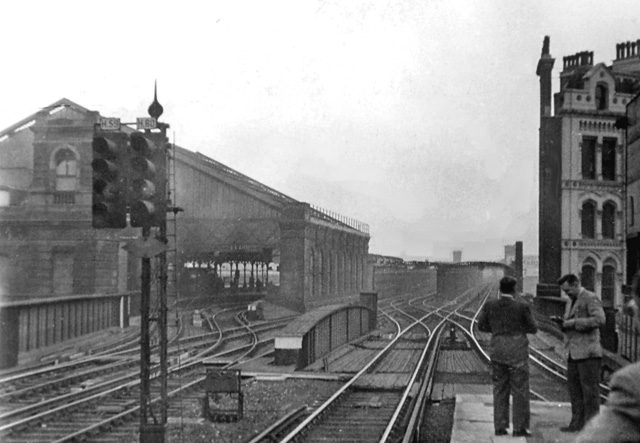
Southern Railway's St Paul's station (left) seen from the platform of Ludgate Hill (c. 1953)

After the opening of St. Paul's station, the earlier Blackfriars Bridge station was closed to passengers but remained as a goods station until 1965. (Note: The station has since been demolished but the entrance driveway remains. Further down Blackfriars Road is the entrance to an earlier station called Blackfriars Road station, which operated from 1864 to 1868 as part of the competing South Eastern Railway and was ultimately replaced by Waterloo East railway station.) Most mainline trains called at St Paul's, including those stopping at Holborn Viaduct. Local commuters continued to use Ludgate Hill where possible, as it was closer to where they were going, but it did not have sufficient capacity.

=== Southern Railway and Southern Region ===
St. Paul's station was renamed by the Southern Railway as Blackfriars on 1 February 1937. This was partly done to avoid confusion after the London Passenger Transport Board renamed Post Office tube station on the Central line to St Paul's, and partly so that the mainline and underground stations would have the same name. It suffered significant bomb damage during World War II. Overnight on 16–17 April 1941, the signalbox on the south side of the bridge was destroyed, along with a bridge over Southwark Street. Seven flagmen were caught in the blast, with three being killed outright, another three dying in hospital from burns and just one surviving after a long recovery in hospital. The signals were not fully restored until 11 August 1946, after the war.

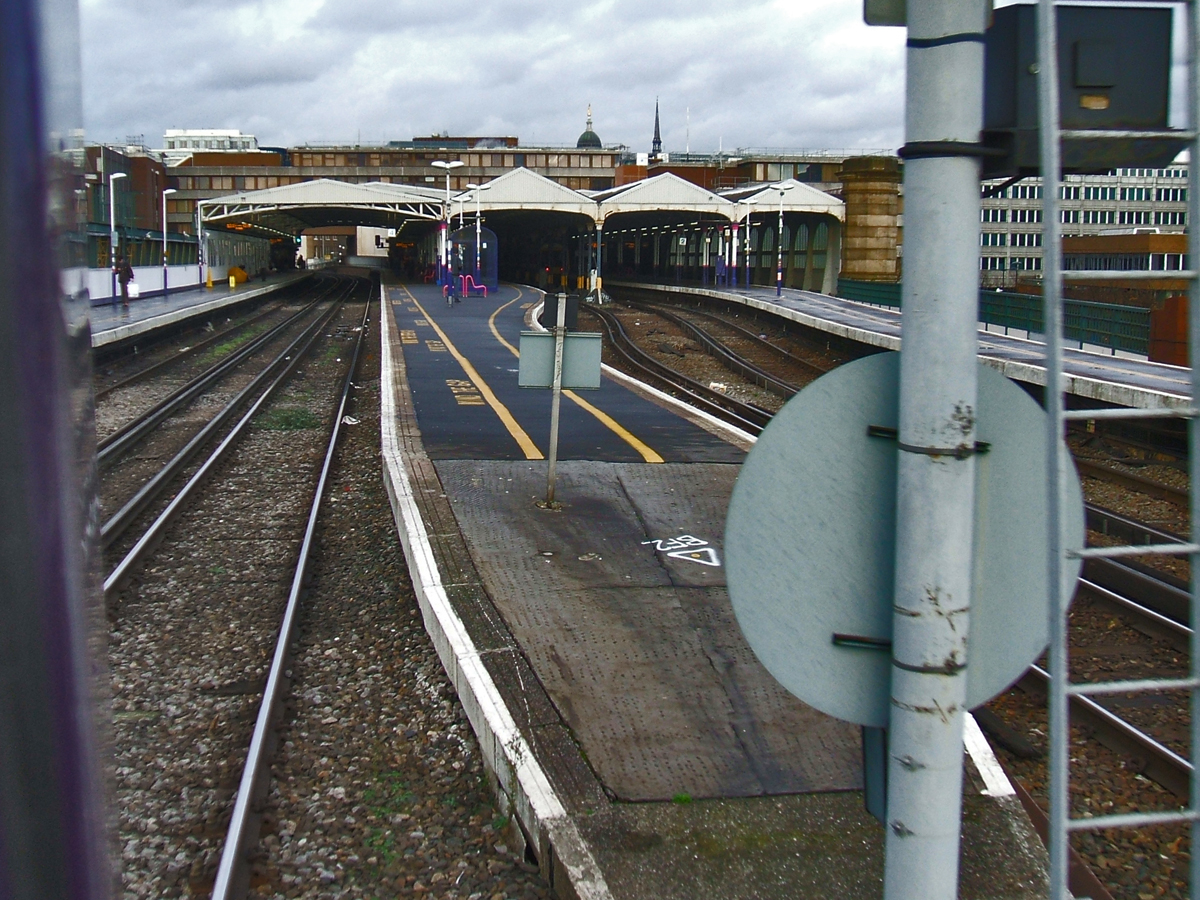
Looking northwards at the 1977–2009 station from a departing train

After the creation of British Railways in 1948, the station was managed by the Southern Region. Gradually, the structure of the original Blackfriars Railway Bridge deteriorated until it was unsound. In 1961, two tracks were removed from the bridge to ease its load. The station had little investment and still supported some of the original architecture and design up to the 1960s. By this time, services were reduced to a handful of commuter services. The original Blackfriars Bridge station, which had remained as a goods depot, was demolished in 1964. The bridge was closed to trains on 27 June 1971 and the deck was removed in 1985, and only the piers in the river and the orange bridge abutments remain.

The station began to be rebuilt along with the Underground station in 1971, which included an additional 150,000 square feet (14,000 m^{2}) of office space. Reconstruction was problematic, as the original station building had sat on top of a cold store, which had frozen the ground below it. The District line tunnel had to be removed and replaced with a new supporting structure that could accommodate the redesigned station building. The work was formally reopened on 30 November 1977 by the Lord Mayor of London, Peter Vanneck (though the station had never actually closed). A part of the stonework elevation from the 1886 LC&DR station has been preserved at platform level in the main line station indicating many destinations in the south-east of England and in Europe.

=== Station rebuild ===
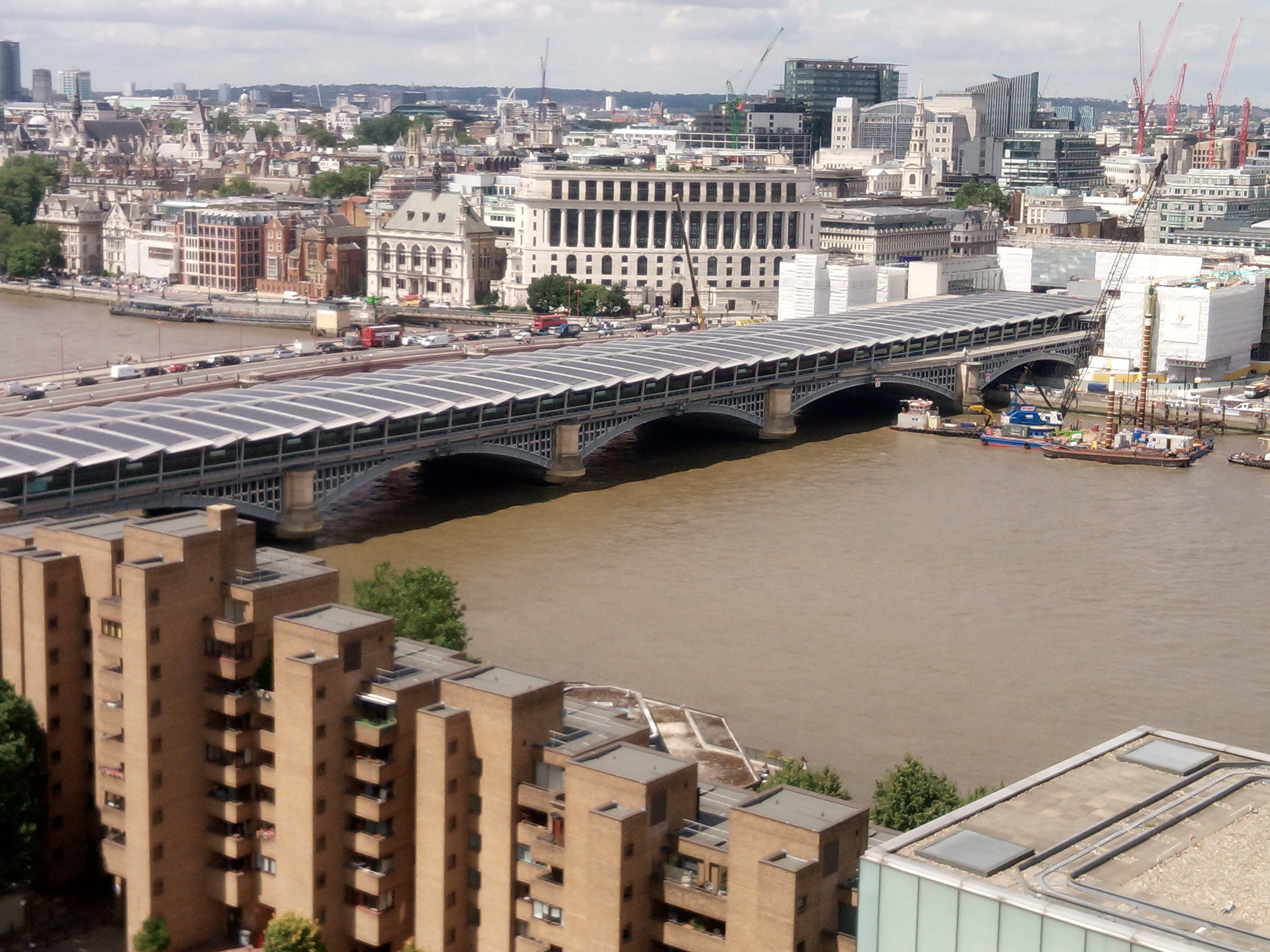
Blackfriars's roof is covered with solar panels to generate electricity.

Blackfriars station was significantly renovated between 2009 and 2012 in a £500 million redevelopment programme to modernise the station and increase capacity. The terminal platforms at the station were closed on 20 March 2009 in order for work to begin. The original concept for the project was designed by Pascall+Watson architects, with execution by Jacobs and Tony Gee and Partners; it was built by Balfour Beatty. The office building above the station was demolished and replaced as part of the Thameslink programme. The new station is the same height and has a combined National Rail and London Underground ticket hall and ventilation shaft together with escalators and lifts between a mezzanine level for main line railway services and the sub-surface level for London Underground services. The Underground station also received major enhancements, with a new roof of glazed north lights and partial-height glazed side panels installed along the entire length of the bridge.

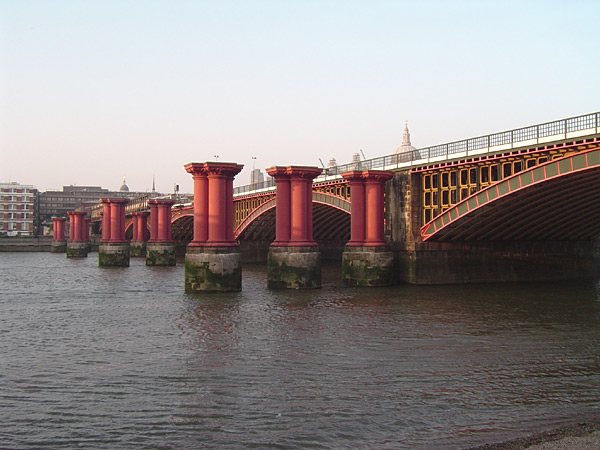
The stumps of the old railway bridge. The rightmost row of stumps were strengthened in 2009 to support the new station and bridge.

On the south bank of the river a new station entrance was built at Bankside, containing a second ticket hall. The through platforms were moved to the east side and extended along Blackfriars Railway Bridge to accommodate 12-carriage trains (in place of the previous eight). The layout has been altered by building new bay platforms on the west side, avoiding the need for through trains between City Thameslink and London Bridge crossing the paths of terminating ones.

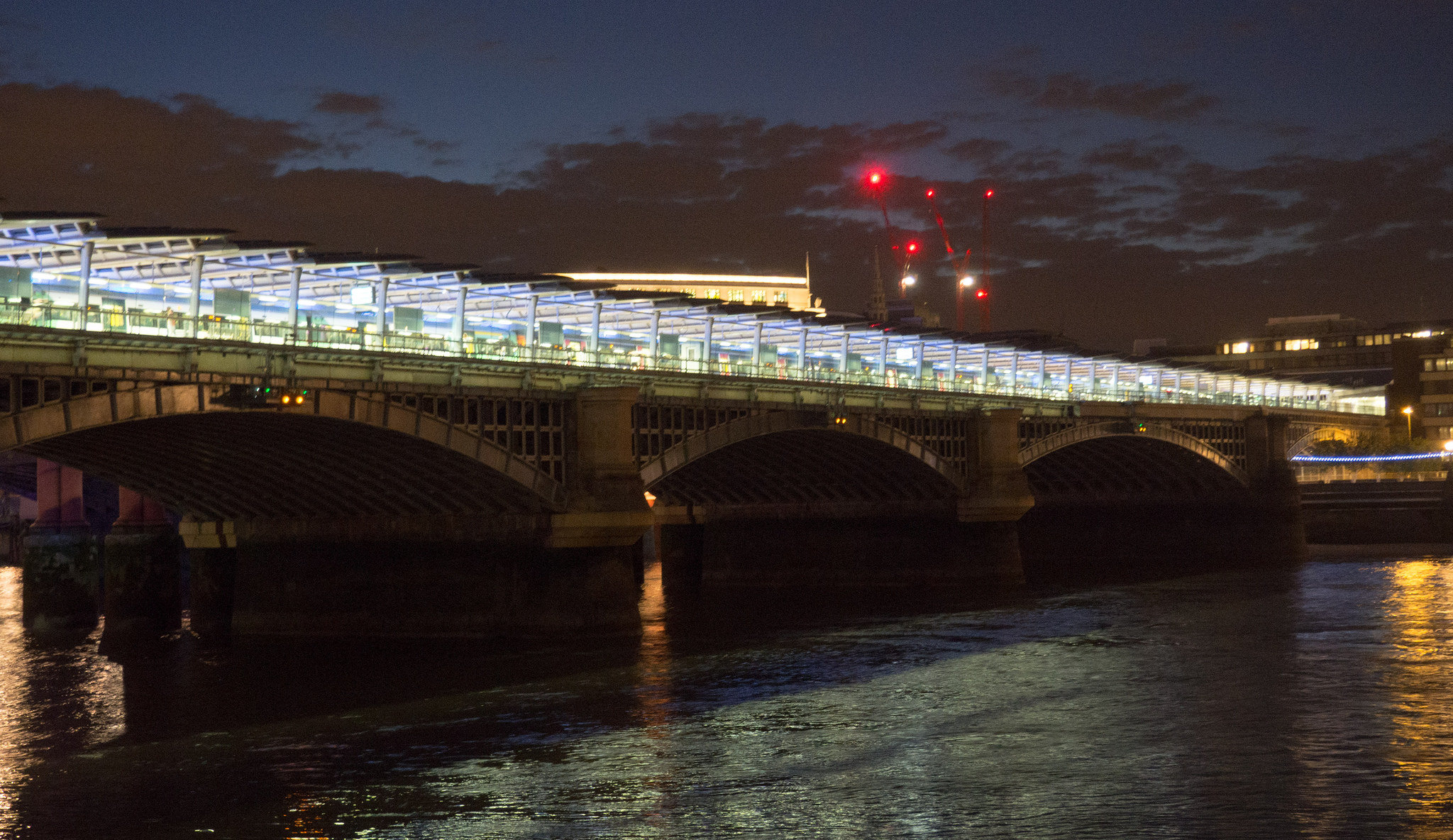
Newly renovated Blackfriars station seen from the Thames

The works exploited the disused piers west of the existing railway bridge which once supported the former West Blackfriars and St. Paul's Railway Bridge. The easternmost row of disused piers was strengthened, tied into the existing bridge and clad in stone. The longer platforms allow longer trains on the Thameslink route to pass through London. Thameslink services began using the newly constructed platforms in early 2011. The station's new entrance and ticket hall on the south side of the river opened on 5 December. The tube station reopened on 20 February 2012. The Mayor of London, Boris Johnson, visited the works on the same day, saying "the rebirth of this central London station will improve the journeys of thousands of passengers every single day". The reconstruction work provided jobs for around 13,000 people, with a peak of 2,000 per day at the busiest times. The Thameslink redevelopment work at Blackfriars has been well received. In January 2014 the Blackfriars Railway Bridge became the world's largest solar-powered bridge having been covered with 4,400 photovoltaic panels providing up to half of the energy for the station. In 2017, the station won a Major Station of the Year award at the National Rail Awards.

The Waterloo & City line, a deep-level tube line which runs non-stop between Waterloo and Bank, runs almost directly under Blackfriars station and there have been suggestions to construct an interchange station for the line at Blackfriars. The Department for Transport considers this to have "no significant transport benefit".

== Accidents ==
- On 19 May 1938, a SECR B1 class locomotive was derailed, causing several hours disruption at the station.
- On 2 January 2014, a train's pantograph struck the roof of the station due to a technical fault. The accident involving a First Capital Connect service from St Albans City to Sevenoaks did not result in any injuries but caused delays of around 45 minutes.

== Services ==
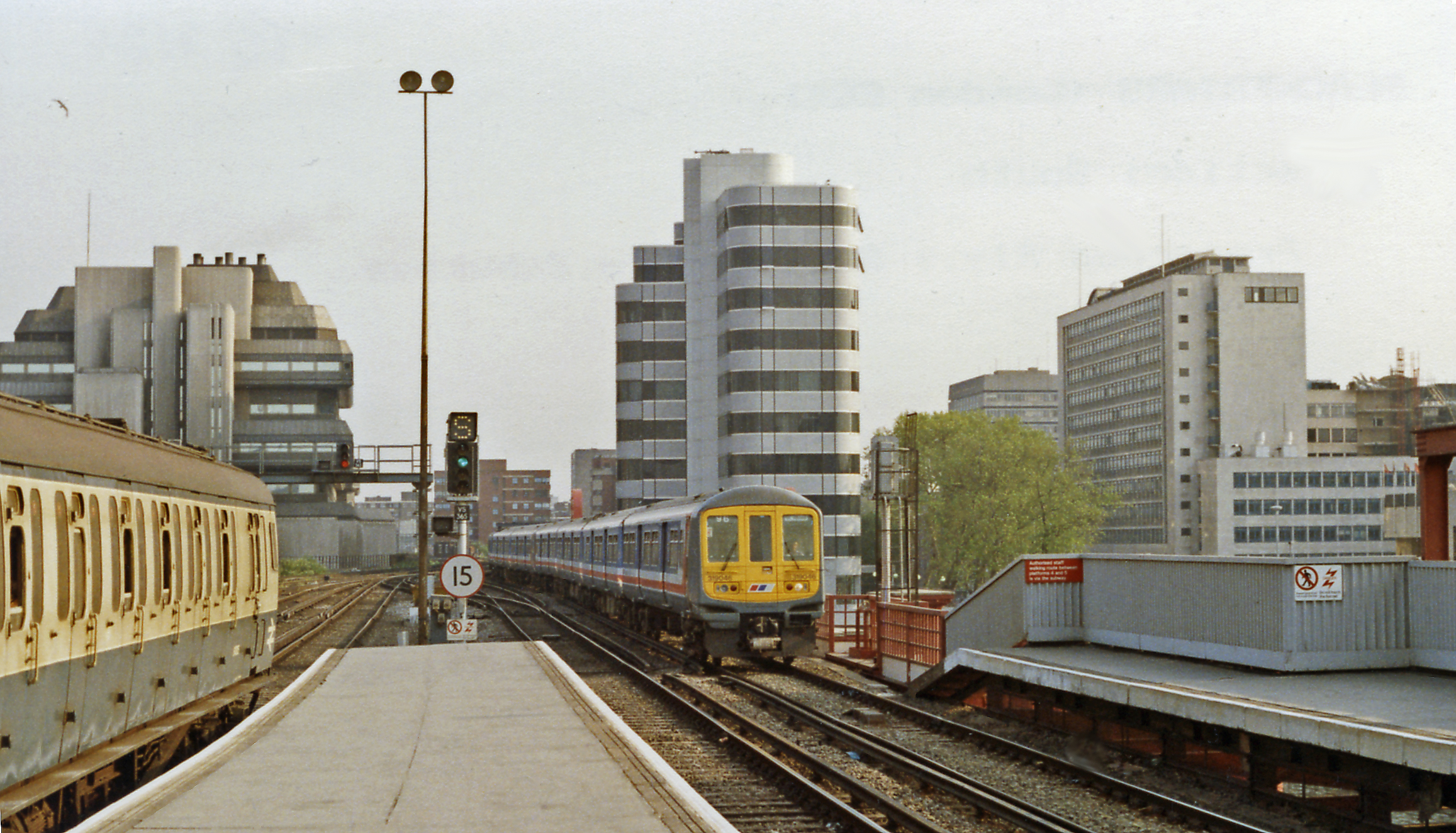
Blackfriars in 1989 with a Class 319 Thameslink train run by Network SouthEast with the Class 415 EPB in the old terminating platforms

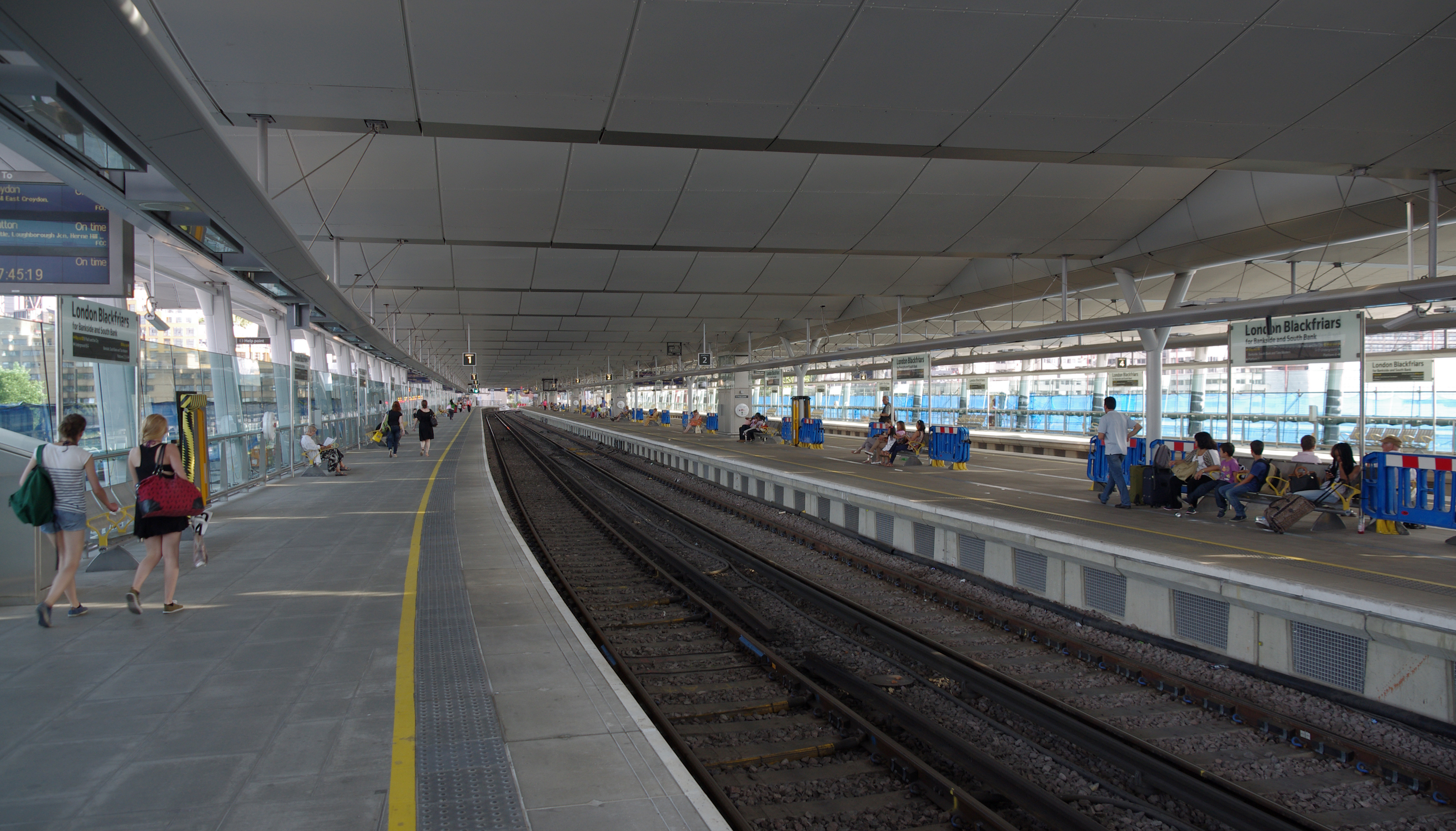
View along the southbound platform spanning the River Thames

Blackfriars main-line station is served by through services on the Thameslink route operated by Thameslink and Southeastern. This includes trains from Bedford, St Albans City and Luton to the north, and Brighton, Sutton and Sevenoaks to the south. Southbound trains run via London Bridge or Elephant & Castle; northbound trains next call at City Thameslink. Before March 2009 some services from the south terminated at three bay platforms, which were then removed during renovation works. Two new bay platforms opened in May 2012 and are used during peak hours and at weekends.

The typical off-peak service in trains per hour (tph) is:

- 4 tph to Brighton via Gatwick Airport
- 2 tph to Horsham via Redhill and Gatwick Airport
- 2 tph to Three Bridges via Redhill
- 2 tph to Rainham via Greenwich, Woolwich Arsenal, Dartford and Gravesend
- 2 tph to Sevenoaks via Catford and Swanley
- 4 tph to Sutton (2 of these run via Mitcham Junction and 2 run via Wimbledon)
- 4 tph to St Albans City (all stations)
- 2 tph to Luton (all stations except Kentish Town, Cricklewood and Hendon)
- 4 tph to Bedford (semi-fast)
- 2 tph to Cambridge via Stevenage
- 2 tph to Peterborough via Stevenage

The station is also served by a small number of Southeastern services to Beckenham Junction and Dartford.

Although many services are Thameslink through trains, Blackfriars is considered a central London terminus and tickets marked 'London Terminals' are valid to use when travelling to/from the south. Tickets marked 'London Thameslink' can be used in both directions.

Preceding station	National Rail	Following station
City Thameslink	Thameslink Thameslink	London Bridge
City Thameslink	Thameslink Thameslink	Elephant & Castle
Terminus	Southeastern Chatham Main Line Limited Service	Elephant & Castle
Preceding station	London Underground	Following station
Temple towards Edgware Road via Victoria	Circle line	Mansion House towards Hammersmith via Tower Hill
Temple towards Wimbledon, Richmond or Ealing Broadway	District line	Mansion House towards Upminster
Disused railways
Ludgate Hill Line open, station closed	London, Chatham & Dover Railway City Branch	Blackfriars Bridge Line open, station closed
Holborn Viaduct Line and station closed	Network SouthEast City Line	Elephant & Castle Line and station open

== Blackfriars Underground station ==
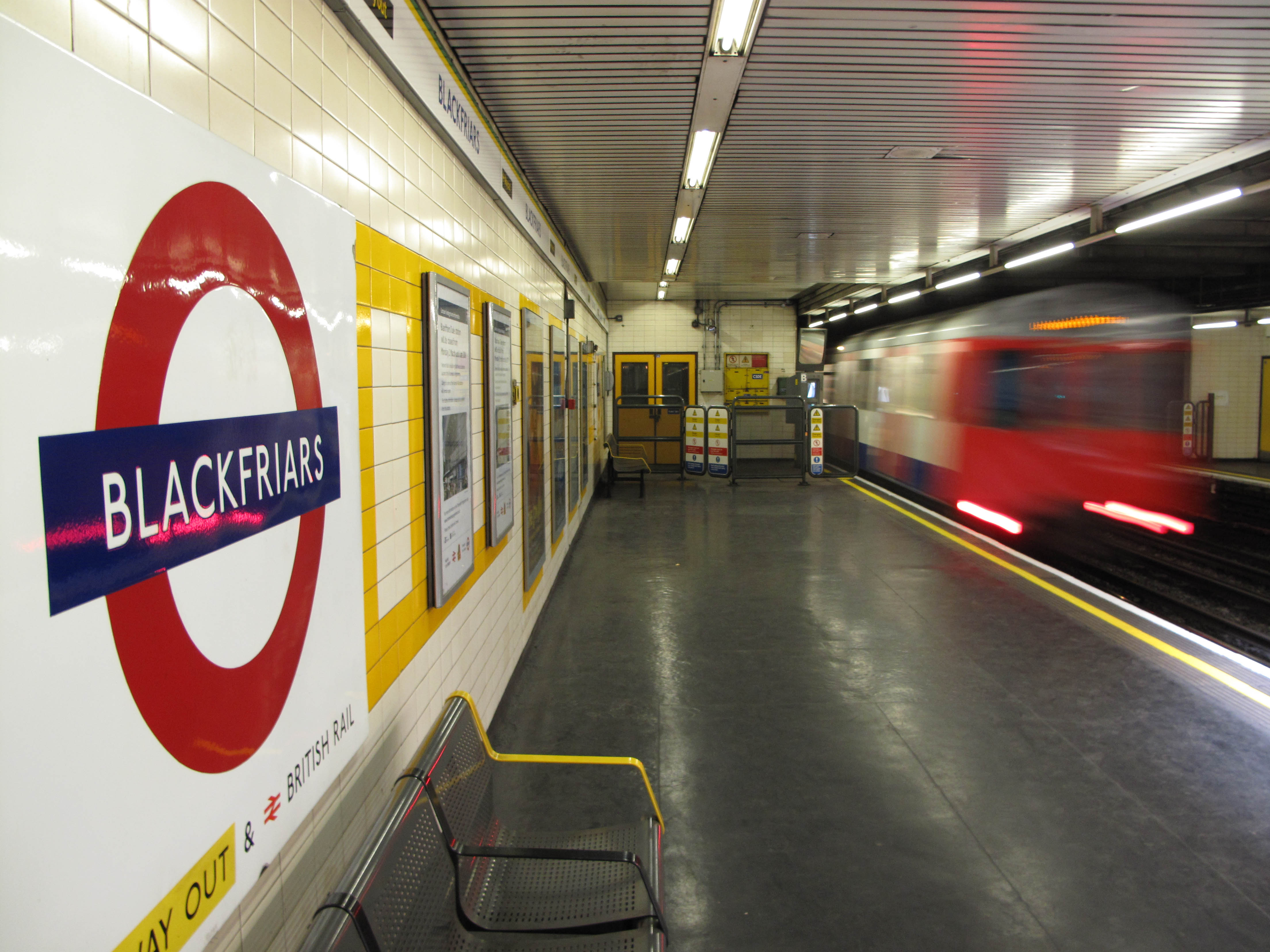
Blackfriars Underground station in 2009, just before extensive refurbishment

Blackfriars Underground station is served by the Circle and District lines and is between Temple and Mansion House stations. The underground station pre-dates the mainline one and was opened on 30 May 1870 by the Metropolitan District Railway (MDR) as the railway's new eastern terminus when the line was extended from Westminster. The MDR was created as a separate company in order to complete the Circle line. The construction of the new section of the MDR was planned in conjunction with the building of the Victoria Embankment and was achieved by the cut and cover method of roofing over a shallow trench. On 3 July 1871 the MDR was extended eastwards to a new terminus at Mansion House. The Circle line ran over the same route, but its completion was delayed following arguments between the District and Metropolitan Railways and did not open until 6 October 1884.

The underground station was closed on 2 March 2009 for major renovation work and reopened on 20 February 2012. This involved demolishing the National Rail building and merging its ticket hall with the Underground's.
