= Cruttwell =

Cruttwell is a surname, and may refer to:

- Clement Cruttwell (1743–1808), English mapmaker
- C. R. M. F. Cruttwell, a British historian and academic who served as dean and later principal of Hertford College, Oxford.
- Edward Cruttwell (1857–1933), English civil engineer
- Greg Cruttwell, English actor, son of Hugh Cruttwell
- Hugh Cruttwell, English teacher of drama
- Maud Cruttwell (1859–1939), English artist, art historian, writer
- Patrick Cruttwell, literary scholar
