= John Lewis Wolfe =

English architect and artist (1798–1881)

John Lewis Wolfe (10 April 1798 - 6 October 1881) was an English architect, artist and stockbroker. He had a longtime friendship with fellow architect Charles Barry, who was inspired to become an architect by Wolfe.

== Early life and education ==
John Lewis Wolfe was born in Streatham, today part of south London. He was the eldest of two sons born to Lewis Wolfe (1761–1838), comptroller of HM Stationery Office, and his wife Ann (née Porter, 1773–1830).

In 1813, Wolfe was articled to the architect Joseph Gwilt, becoming his favourite pupil. In September 1819, he began a three-year tour of Europe to study architecture. While in Rome, he met Charles Barry, starting a life-long friendship while measuring and drawing Italian Renaissance buildings. Wolfe accompanied Barry to Florence and Veneto, then travelled to Greece and Sicily with architects Thomas Leverton Donaldson and W. W. Jenkins, before returning to London in 1822.

== Business career ==
He started in architectural practice, entering a design competition for new buildings at King's College, Cambridge, but his Italian design was unsuccessful.

Soon after, he joined his brother, Lewis Mortlock Wolfe (1801–1862), establishing a stockbroking business (Wolfe Brothers) based at 23 Change Alley, Cornhill, London until 1848. He remained a member of the London Stock Exchange until 1878.

However, he retained his interest in architecture, mentoring Barry's practice and offering frequent design advice. Wolfe's influence is evident in designs for the Travellers Club (1829), in Barry's successful competition entry for the Reform Club (1837), and in Barry's designs for the Houses of Parliament at Westminster. Victoria Tower, St Stephen's porch, the ceilings of both houses, and the clock tower are said to show Wolfe's modifications.

From about the mid-1830s Wolfe's influence on Barry's work diminished, but he remained close to the Barry family and was godson to their fifth son, named John after him, and to daughter Adelaide Sarah. After Barry's death in 1860, Wolfe contributed anonymously to obituaries, helped compile Barry's biography, and organised a fund (to which he contributed £200) for Barry's statue in the Palace of Westminster. He did not get drawn into contemporary debates about whether Barry or Augustus Pugin had been the primary architect of the new palace.

On 6 October 1881, Wolfe died at the Great Western Hotel, Paddington. He was buried at Brompton Cemetery on 10 October 1881. Much of his £140,000 estate went to his godson who was becoming a prominent civil engineer, and who —in Wolfe's honour— added Wolfe to his name after being knighted in 1898, becoming Sir John Wolfe Barry.
