= Blackfriars Railway Bridge =

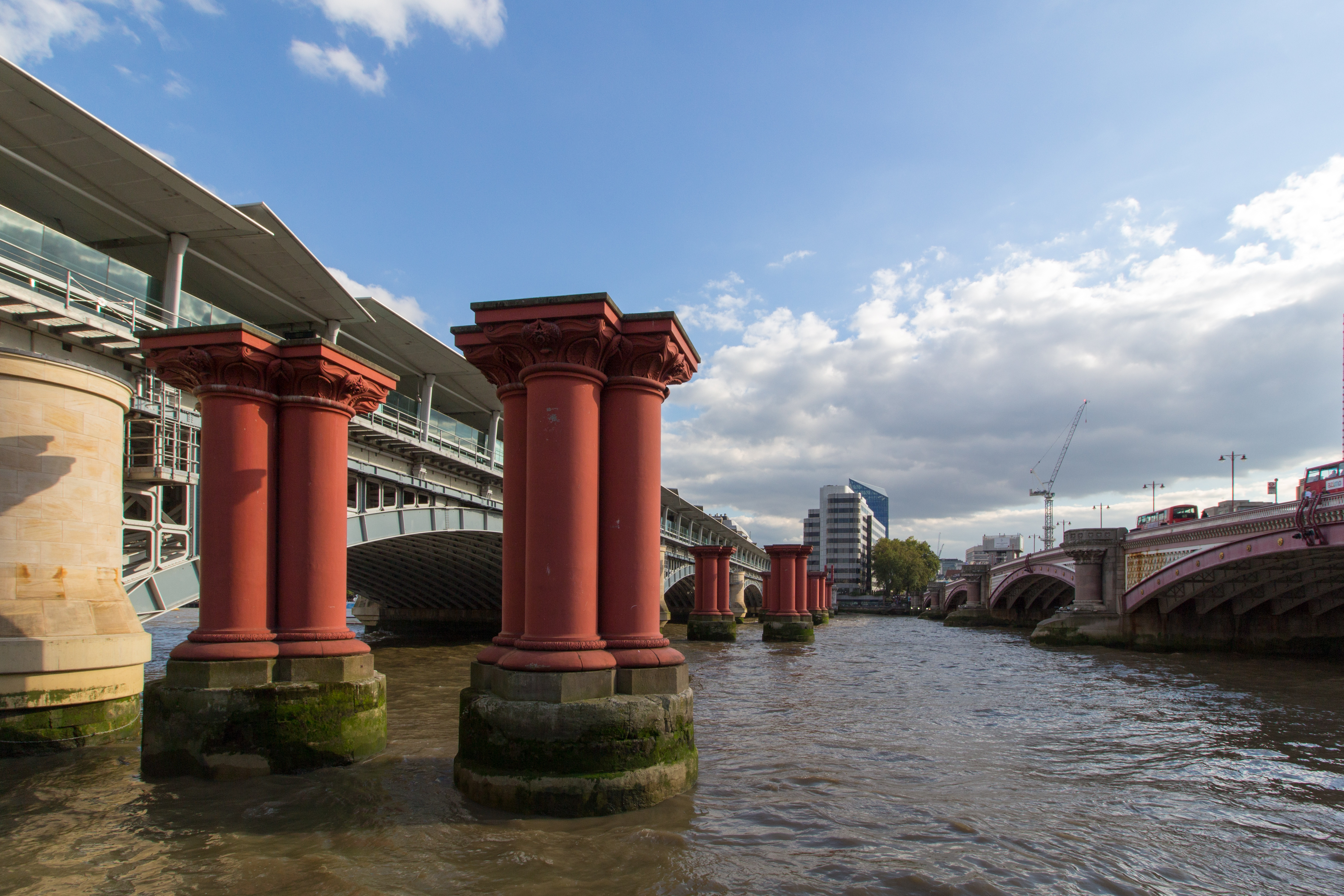
- The current Blackfriars Railway Bridge (on the left) and remains of the old bridge, viewed from the north bank of the Thames
- Coordinates: 51°30′35″N 0°06′12″W
- Carries: Holborn Viaduct–Herne Hill line
- Crosses: River Thames
- Locale: London
- Maintained by: Network Rail
- Preceded by: Blackfriars Bridge
- Followed by: Millennium Bridge

Characteristics
- Design: Arch

History
- Opened: 1886

Location
- Interactive map of Blackfriars Railway Bridge

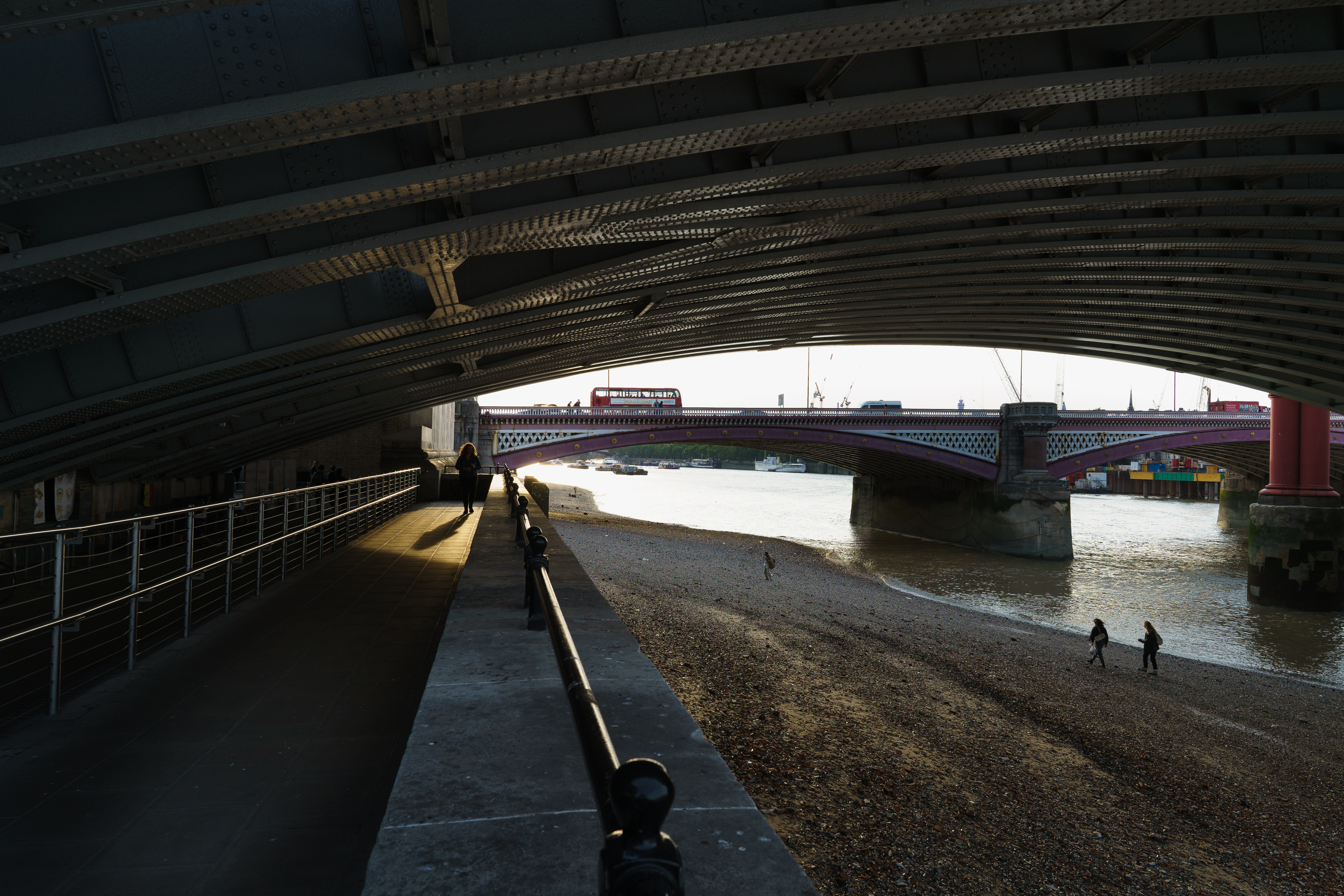
Thames Path under the Blackfriars Railway Bridge

Blackfriars Railway Bridge is a railway bridge crossing the River Thames in London, between Blackfriars Bridge and the Millennium Bridge.

== First bridge ==
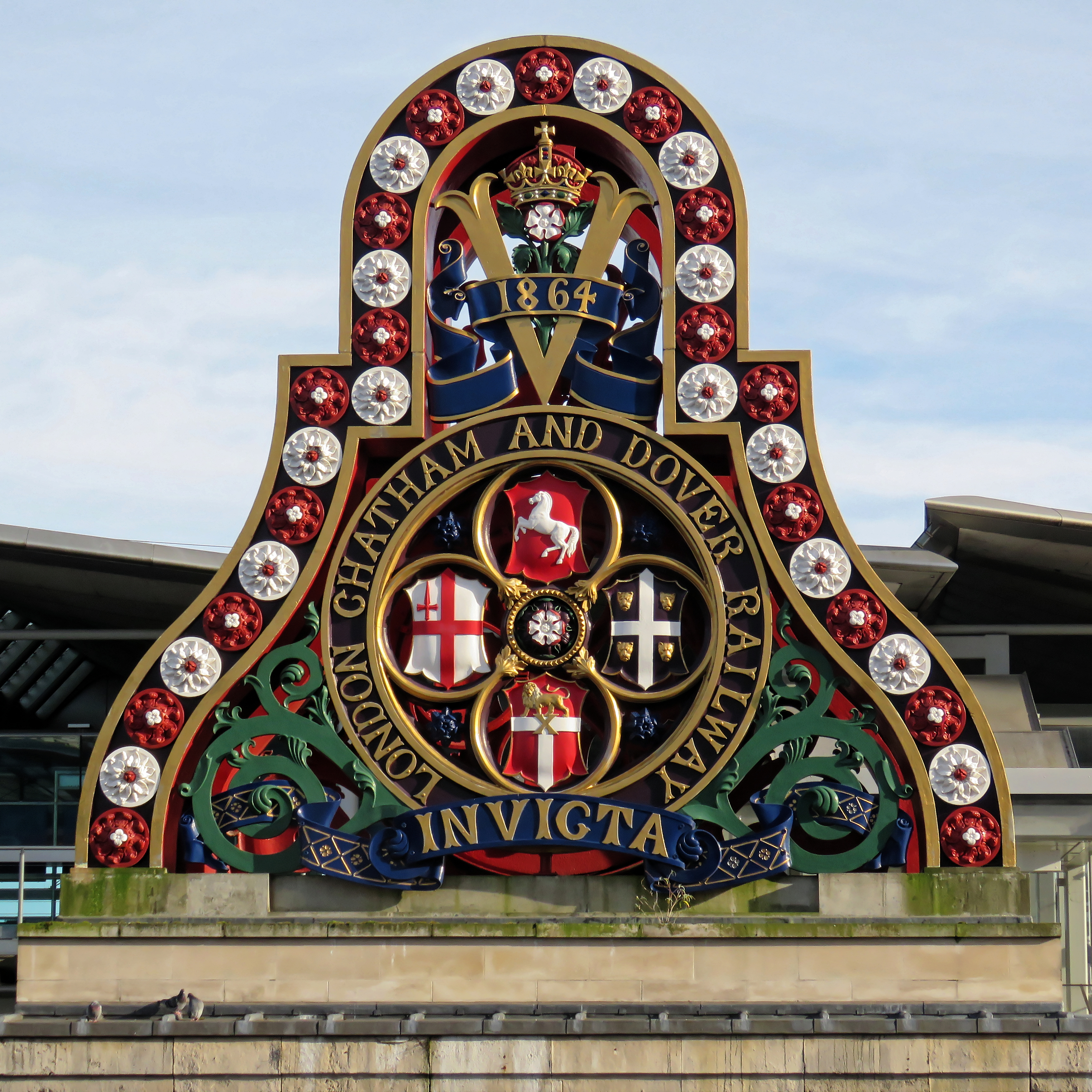
Remaining column of the 1864 bridge, showing the insignia of the London, Chatham and Dover Railway

There have been two structures with the name. The first bridge was opened in 1864 and was designed by Joseph Cubitt for the London, Chatham and Dover Railway. Massive abutments at each end carried the railway's insignia, preserved and restored on the south side. Following the formation of the Southern Railway in 1924, inter-city and continental services were concentrated on Waterloo, and St Paul's Station became a local and suburban stop. For this reason, the use of the original bridge gradually declined. It eventually became too weak to support modern trains, and was therefore removed in 1985 – all that remains is a series of columns crossing the Thames and the southern abutment, which is a Grade II listed structure.

At the southern end of the bridge was Blackfriars Bridge railway station which opened in 1864 before closing to passengers in 1885 following the opening of what is today the main Blackfriars station. Blackfriars Bridge railway station continued as a goods stop until 1964 when it was mostly demolished, and much of it redeveloped into offices.

== Second bridge ==
The second bridge, built slightly further downstream (to the east), was originally called St Paul's Railway Bridge and opened in 1886 together with a new station in Queen Victoria Street called St Paul's Station. The joint engineers for the works were William Mills, of the London, Chatham, and Dover Company, and John Wolfe Barry and Henry Marc Brunel. The resident engineer in charge of the construction was Edward Cruttwell. The bridge is made of wrought iron. It was built by Lucas and Aird.

The need for the second bridge was the lack of capacity and overcrowding at the first station which had become "in the highest degree dangerous". The directors of the London, Chatham, and Dover Railway determined that they needed to double the lines across the Thames.

The original design was for four rail lines but once work was underway it was decided to expand the bridge to carry seven lines of railway which required extensions to the four piers. The bridge had a clear width of 81 ft between the parapets, increasing to 123 ft at the northernmost span to provide space for the platforms. The bridge had five spans, the shore span on the Surrey side being 183 ft, the centre span and Middlesex shore span 185 ft each, and the second and fourth spans 175 ft each. The lengths of the three middle spans corresponded with those of the old bridge alongside for ease of navigation.

When St Paul's railway station changed its name to Blackfriars in 1937 the name of the bridge was changed as well to Blackfriars Railway Bridge.

As part of the Thameslink Programme, the platforms at Blackfriars station were extended across the Thames and partially supported by the 1864 bridge piers. The project was designed by Will Alsop and built by Balfour Beatty. The work also included the installation of a roof covered with photovoltaic solar panels. It is the largest of only three solar bridges in the world (the others being Kennedy Bridge in Bonn, Germany, and Kurilpa Bridge in Australia). Other green improvements included sun pipes and systems to collect rain water.

== See also ==
- List of crossings of the River Thames
- List of bridges in London
