= Maud Cruttwell =

English artist, art historian, writer and biographer

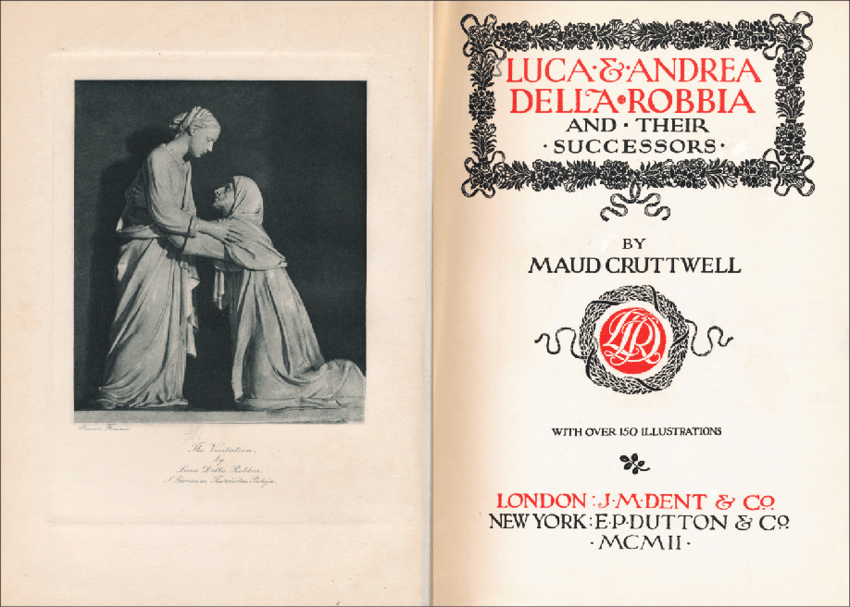
Frontispiece of Maud Cruttwell's book "Luca and Andrea della Robbia and Their Successors", 1902

Maud [Alice Wilson] Cruttwell (1859 - 25 April 1939) was an English artist, art historian, writer and biographer. Her books on Italian Renaissance artists were pioneering examples of the analytical critical style of Giovanni Morelli and Bernard Berenson.

== From artist to critic ==
Maud Cruttwell was born in Frome in 1859 to the solicitor Wilson Clement Cruttwell and his wife Georgiana (née Daniel), the eleventh and youngest of eleven children. Her older brother was Edward Cruttwell, resident engineer responsible for the building of Tower Bridge. According to Cruttwell's friend the art historian Bernard Berenson "her mother was a full-blooded Jewess".

She began her career as an artist, exhibiting at the Royal Academy exhibitions and other London galleries in the early 1890s. In this she was encouraged by the art critic Julia Cartwright, who also introduced Cruttwell to the writer and critic Violet Paget (who published under the name Vernon Lee). In 1893, Paget, with whom she was travelling, introduced Cruttwell in Florence to Berenson's consort Mary Costelloe; from 1894 Cruttwell became Costelloe's housekeeper, in return for instruction in Italian Renaissance art. Costelloe, a talented art historian like Berenson, lived in Florence close to Berenson's Villa I Tatti and was later able to marry Berenson when her former husband died in 1900; she became a friend and supporter of Crutwell. Through Costelloe, Cruttwell met with Berenson and became a member of his student circle, studying art history on the analytical principles of Giovanni Morelli. In the words of Carlo Ginzburg, using the Morellian method, the art historian operates in the manner of a detective, "each discovering, from clues unnoticed by others, the author in one case of a crime, in the other of a painting". Cruttwell's subsequent works on artists all "open with a chapter on the 'characteristics' of the old master in question, a procedure that discloses her allegiance to the 'scientific method' of connoisseurship" and which clearly displays her as a disciple of Morelli and Berenson. Reminiscing in his autobiography about Florence at the turn of the twentieth century, the artist William Rothenstein wrote in 1932, comparing the city with its mediaeval past: "There were armed camps and fierce rivalries in Florence then, as in past times; but the fighting was far less bloody, concerned as it was with attributions rather than with ducal thrones. Berenson, Horne, Loeser, Vernon Lee, Maud Cruttwell, all had their mercenaries — and their artillery."

== Writings on art ==
In 1897 Cruttwell began to publish articles on Renaissance art in art journals; her first monograph, on Luca Signorelli, was published in London in 1899. This was followed by a work on Mantegna (London, 1901). In her third book Luca and Andrea della Robbia and their Successors (London, 1902), she demonstrated the difference and superiority of the work of Andrea della Robbia as compared to that of his nephew Luca. Her work on this book involved extensive research in collections throughout Europe, and led to her reassigning many attributions. The book was generally well received, although it was heavily criticized by the anti-Morrellian art historian Wilhelm von Bode. Her next two books on Verrocchio (1904) and Pollaiuolo (1907) (of which Bode wrote a further severe review) were issued by a publisher (Arthur Strong) who had quarrelled with Berenson, but Cruttwell sought successfully to ensure that her good relationship with the Berensons continued.

There followed two books on art in Florence (A Guide to the Paintings in the Florentine Galleries (1907) and A Guide to the Paintings in the Churches and Minor Museums of Florence (1908)), and a guide to Venice, Venice and her Treasures (1909). In 1907 Cruttwell wrote to the Berensons that she was writing her final book on art, on Donatello (eventually published in 1911), as she intended to relocate to Paris and pursue "modern journalism".

== Life, fiction and biography ==
Cruttwell was associated with some notable feminist and lesbian personalities of her period; apart from Paget and Mary Berenson, she was a regular correspondent of Ottoline Morell, Gertrude Stein and Alice B. Toklas. From 1907 onwards she seems to have 'come out'. In 1907 Mary Berenson noted in her diary that Cruttwell was " a maniac à rebours [against nature] loathing men and adoring women." In 1908 she commented that Cruttwell dressed in "a loud, improper way" and on a visit in 1912 Cruttwell appeared to her overweight and "vulgarly dressed." In 1913 Cruttwell published a novel Fire and Frost, whose heroine, clearly based on the author, adores beauty and Italian art, determines never to marry, and befriends a couple evidently based on the Berensons. Cruttwell continued to live in Paris but her only further publications were biographies of the Princesse des Ursins (1927) and Madame de Maintenon (1929). By this time she was writing to Paget (letter of 3 December 1929) of "that hideous Berenson element, pretentious & false even to the art they pretend to care for."

Cruttwell died in Paris on 25 April 1939; her obituary in The Times noted that her books on Italian artists, though written "many years ago [...] are still valued as standard works." In recent years interest in Cruttwell has rekindled as part of the growing recognition of the work of female art scholars from the late 19th century onwards.
