= Joseph Cubitt =

English civil engineer (1811–1872)

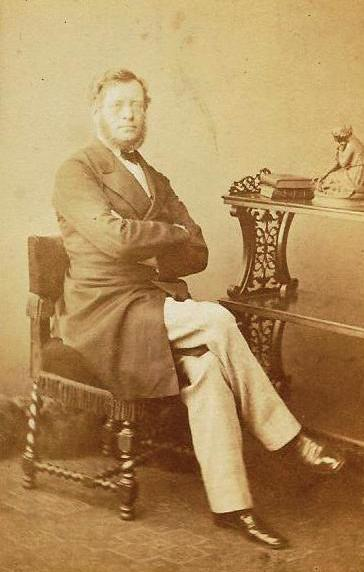
- Cubitt in the 1860s
- Born: 24 November 1811; Horning, Norfolk, England
- Died: 7 December 1872 (aged 61); St George Hanover Square, London, England
- Parent(s): Sir William Cubitt; Abigail Sparkhall Cubitt
- Engineering career
- Discipline: Civil engineering
- Projects: London and South-Western Railway; Great Northern Railway; London, Chatham, and Dover Railway; Weymouth Pier; Blackfriars Bridge

Joseph Cubitt (24 November 1811 – 7 December 1872) was an English civil engineer. Amongst other projects, he designed the Blackfriars Railway Bridge over the River Thames in London.

== Early life ==
Cubitt was born in Horning, Norfolk, on 24 November 1811. He was the son of Sir William Cubitt and Abigail Sparkhall (1785–1813). After his mother's death, his father married Elizabeth Jane Tiley in 1820. From his father's second marriage, he had a younger half-brother, William, born 1830.

He was educated at Bruce Castle School in Tottenham. He was trained for the profession of civil engineer by his father.

== Career ==
Cubitt constructed a great part of the London and South-Western Railway, the whole of the Great Northern Railway, the London, Chatham, and Dover Railway, the Rhymney Railway, the Oswestry and Newtown Railway, and the Colne Valley Railway. He was appointed engineer to the Oswestry & Newtown Railway on 3 October 1856.

Cubitt was responsible for Weymouth Pier, the extension of the north pier and other works of Great Yarmouth haven, and the new Blackfriars Bridge. He was a member of the Royal Geographical Society, and for many years vice-president of the Institution of Civil Engineers. He was also a lieutenant-colonel of the Engineer and Railway Staff volunteers.

== Personal life ==
Cubitt died on 7 December 1872 in St George Hanover Square, London.

== Ancestry ==
Ancestors of Joseph Cubitt

16.
8.
17.
Joseph Cubitt (1760-1829)
18.
9.
19.
William Cubitt (1785-1861)
20.
10.
21.
Hannah Lubock (1765-1831)
22.
11.
23.
Joseph Cubitt (1811–1872)
24.
12.
25.
6.
26.
13.
27.
Abigail Sparkhall (1785-1813)
28.
14.
29.
7.
30.
15.
31.

== See also ==
- Herne Hill railway station
