= John Wolfe Barry =

English civil engineer (1836–1918)

Sir John Wolfe Barry KCB FRS
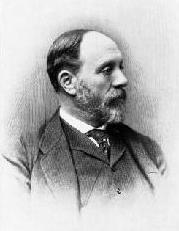
- Born: 7 December 1836; London, England
- Died: 22 January 1918 (aged 81); Delahaye House, Chelsea, London, England
- Education: Glenalmond College; King's College, London
- Parent: Charles Barry
- Engineering career
- Discipline: Civil
- Institutions: Institution of Civil Engineers (president)
- Projects: Tower Bridge, Blackfriars Railway Bridge
- Significant design: Cannon Street Railway Bridge, Kew Bridge, District line

Sir John Wolfe Barry KCB FRS (7 December 1836 – 22 January 1918) was an English civil engineer known for engineering Tower Bridge over the River Thames in London, which was constructed between 1886 and 1894. He was the youngest son of architect Sir Charles Barry. He added "Wolfe" as a forename after receiving an inheritance from his godfather, the architect John Lewis Wolfe (1798–1881). After receiving a knighthood in 1897, he changed his surname to "Wolfe-Barry", so being known generally as Sir John Wolfe-Barry but legally as Sir John Wolfe Wolfe-Barry.

== Early years and education ==
Barry was born in London on 7 December 1836. He was the youngest of five sons of the architect Charles Barry and his wife, Sarah Rowsell. He was named after his godfather, the artist John Lewis Wolfe, and would later add ‘Wolfe’ to his surname.

Barry was educated at Trinity College, Glenalmond and King's College, London.

He was a pupil of civil engineer Sir John Hawkshaw, as was his future business partner Henry Marc Brunel, son of the great Isambard Kingdom Brunel. Barry was assistant resident engineer for Hawkshaw on the Charing Cross and Cannon Street Railways.

== Career ==
Barry started his own practice in 1867, initially carrying out more work on railway projects signposting a lifelong interest in that area of engineering. Over his career to 1918, he "devoted himself largely to the construction of bridges, railways, and docks."

=== Partnerships ===
Wolfe Barry's friend Henry Brunel had been in practice on his own account from 1871. In 1878 the two men went into partnership. In 1891 Wolfe Barry entered into partnership with his nephew Lt. Col. Arthur John Barry. In 1901, Edward Cruttwell who had been resident engineer on Blackfriars Railway Bridge and Tower Bridge resumed his relationship with Wolfe Barry when he joined Sir John Wolfe Barry and Partners as partner.

In 1902 Wolfe Barry also joined the consulting firm of Robert White & Partners, which was renamed Wolfe Barry, Robert White & Partners (later, in 1946, renamed Sir Bruce White, Wolfe Barry and Partners).

At Wolfe Barry's death, the partners in his firm, Sir John Wolfe Barry and Partners, were his second son Kenneth Alfred Wolfe Barry, Anthony George Lyster, past president of the Institution of Civil Engineers, and Edward Cruttwell.

=== Bridge, railway and dock projects ===
==== Bridge projects ====
Tower Bridge made Wolfe Barry's name. In 1878, architect Horace Jones first proposed a bascule bridge. An Act of Parliament allowing the Corporation of the City of London to build it was passed in 1885. Jones was appointed architect, and developed an initial scheme for which he was knighted in 1886. Wolfe Barry, already well-established with experience of bridges across the Thames, was introduced as the engineer for the project and with Henry Marc Brunel redesigned the mechanisms resulting in a modified plan. Within a month of construction starting Sir Horace Jones died, leaving Wolfe Barry and Brunel to oversee and complete the works. The bridge was completed in 1894. Wolfe Barry received a CBE for his work on Tower Bridge afterwards being styled Sir John Wolfe Barry.

Other bridge projects included:

- Cannon Street Railway Bridge (also known as the Alexandra Bridge) (1866)
- Blackfriars Railway Bridge (known as St Paul's Bridge until 1937), London (1886)
- Kew Bridge, west London (1903)

==== Railway projects ====
Railways were a particular focus and he was Consulting Engineer on works to, amongst other lines:

- Metropolitan District Railway
- Lewes and East Grinstead Railway
- Metropolitan line and stations
- Barry Docks railways
- underground railways of the Caledonian Railway in Glasgow
- Callander and Oban Railway
- District line of the London Underground (with Sir John Hawkshaw)

==== Dock projects ====
Dock projects included:

- Barry Docks (not a namesake) near Cardiff, south Wales
- Lady Windsor Deep Lock and Graving-dock
- Limekiln Wharf
- Grangemouth Dock Extension
- Expansion of Greenland Dock, Surrey Docks (now Surrey Quays), south-east London (1904)
- Middlesbrough Dock Extension
- Immingham Dock (1912)
- Joint Dock, Kingston upon Hull (1914), with Benjamin Baker
- Royal Edward Dock at Avonmouth, also with Benjamin Baker and Mr A C Hurtzig
- No.3 Fish Dock, Grimsby (1934)

==== Other projects ====
- Pumping stations on the Regent's Canal, north London

=== Industry standardisation ===
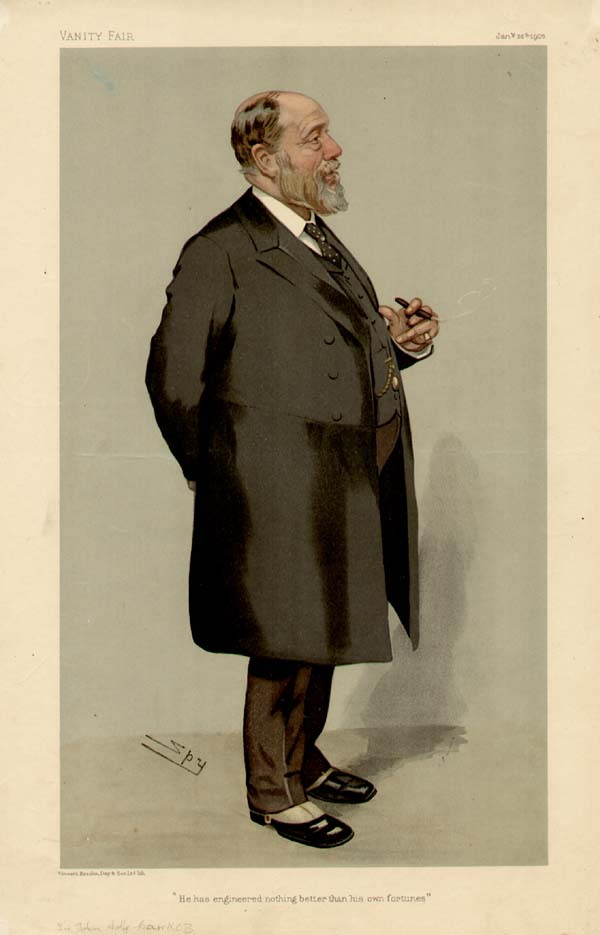
Wolfe Barry caricatured by Spy for Vanity Fair, 1905

Barry played a prominent role in the development of industry standardisation, urging the ICE's Council to form a committee to focus on standards for iron and steel sections. Two members each from the ICE, the Institution of Mechanical Engineers, the Institution of Naval Architects and the Iron and Steel Institute first met on 26 April 1901. With the Institution of Electrical Engineers who joining the following year, these bodies were the founder institutions of what is today the British Standards Institution or BSI. Barry also designed the BSI Kitemark.

In 1917, Barry delivered a lecture to the Institution of Civil Engineers on "The Standardisation of Engineering Materials and its Influence on the Prosperity of the Country." The effect of the standardisation of the profession he illustrated by reference to rolled steel sections where "at least 85 per cent, and in some cases 95 per cent, were rolled to standard specifications."

== Public life ==
Barry:

"gave ungrudging assistance to all public undertakings and inquiries involving engineering considerations and had great influence in many ways in promoting the industrial and commercial prosperity of the country."

He was elected a Fellow of the Royal Society (FRS) in 1895 and made a Knight Commander of the Order of the Bath (KCB) in 1897. He was elected President of the Institution of Civil Engineers (Pres.Inst.C.E.) from 1896-97, and was a member of that body for fifty years, being on its council for thirty-four years. He was also a member of the Smeatonian Society of Civil Engineers. He chaired the Executive Committee of the City and Guilds of London Institute instituting the need for Civil Engineers to pass an exam for admission to membership of ICE.

His interests were not limited to engineering though and he was chairman of the council of the Royal Society of Arts from 1898-1899. In his inaugural address he reviewed transport arrangements in London and proposed various street improvements including a new east-west main avenue connecting the west end of Commercial Road to Bayswater Road just west of Marble Arch.

Between 1892 and 1906 he represented the British Government alongside Sir Charles Hartley on the International Consultative Committee of the Suez Canal. He helped establish and organise the National Physical Laboratory becoming one of the founding members of its executive committee. He was Chairman of the City and Guilds Institute, and for twenty years of Westminster Hospital.

He was chairman of Cable and Wireless from 1900 to 1917.

Between 1903-1905 he was a member of the Royal Commission on London Traffic and Chairman of the three-man Advisory Board of Engineers.

His obituary from the Institution of Civil Engineers noted that "His death was a national loss, and it was recognized as such...for years before his death he was the acknowledged head and representative of the [engineering] profession in Britain."

== Personal life ==
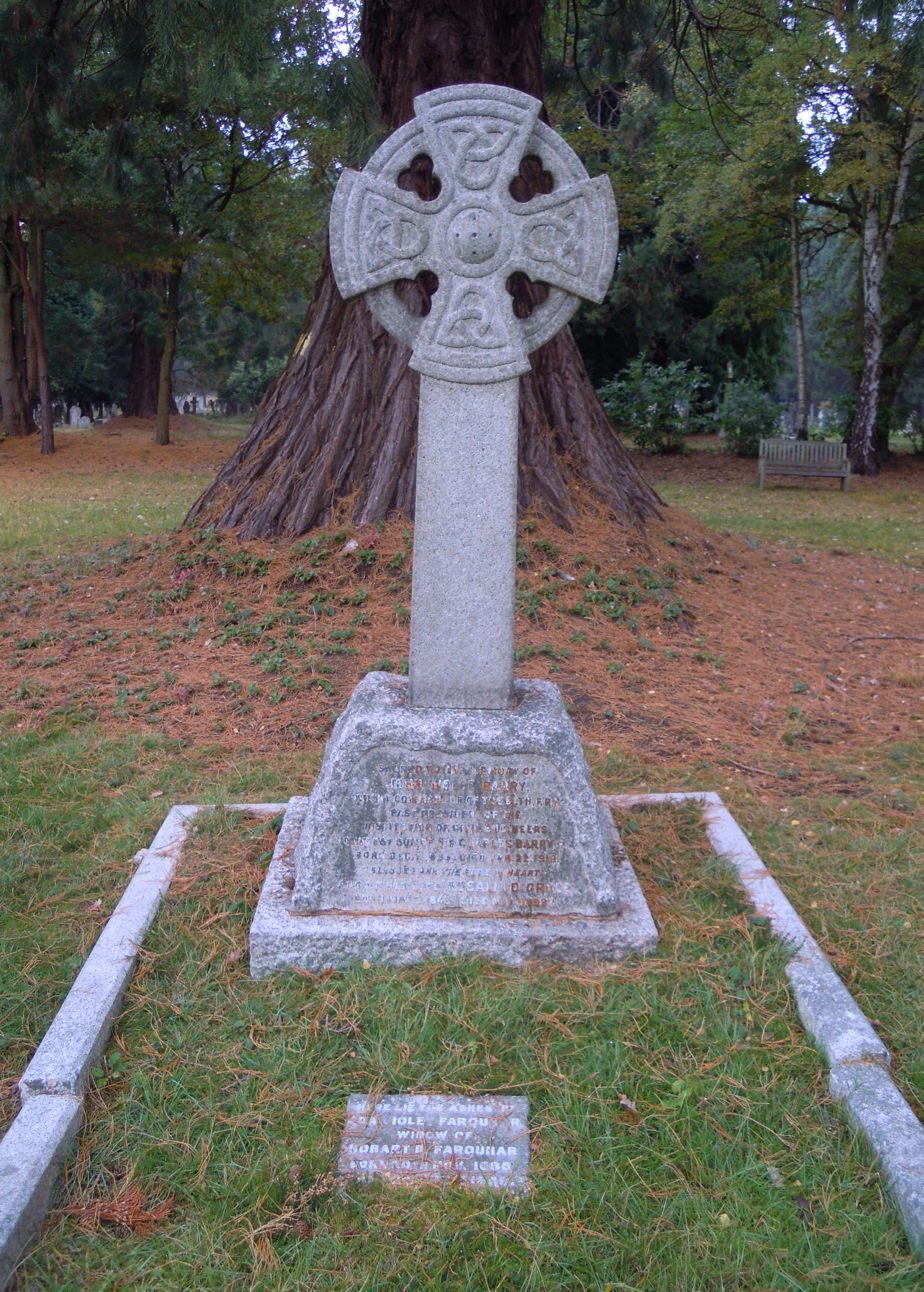
Barry's grave in Brookwood Cemetery

He had married Rosalind Grace, the daughter of Rev Evan Edward Rowsell of Hambledon, Surrey. They had four sons and three daughters. In 1922 a memorial window designed by Sir John Ninian Comper was dedicated to his memory in the nave of Westminster Abbey.

Wolfe Barry published the results of an investigation into his family's genealogy in 1906.

Wolfe Barry died on 22 January 1918 aged 82, and was buried in Brookwood Cemetery near Woking in Surrey.

Coat of arms of John Wolfe Barry

Motto
Boutez En-Avant

Professional and academic associations
| Preceded by Benjamin Baker | President of the Institution of Civil Engineers; June 1896 – April 1898 | Succeeded by William Henry Preece |
