= Henry Marc Brunel =

English civil engineer (1842–1903)

- Born: Henry Marc Brunel; 27 June 1842; Westminster, Middlesex, England
- Died: 7 October 1903 (aged 61); Westminster, London, England
- Occupation: Civil Engineer
- Years active: 1861 – 1903
- Parents: Isambard Kingdom Brunel (1806-1859) (father); Mary Horsley (mother)
- Relatives: Marc Isambard Brunel (paternal grandfather)

Henry Marc Brunel (27 June 1842 – 7 October 1903) was an English civil engineer and the son of engineer Isambard Kingdom Brunel and grandson of civil engineer Marc Isambard Brunel best known for his design work on Tower Bridge built in partnership with Sir John Wolfe Barry.

== Early life and education ==
Henry Marc Brunel, known as Henry, was born in Westminster, London, on 27 June 1842, the second son of the celebrated engineer Isambard Kingdom Brunel and Elizabeth Mary Horsley.

After being educated at Harrow School, Brunel decided to follow in his father and grandfather's footsteps by becoming a civil engineer and attended King's College London from 1859, the year of his father's death, until 1861. He then gained experience in civil engineering initially being apprenticed for three years to Sir William Armstrong from 1861.

== Career ==
In 1863 Brunel joined Sir John Hawkshaw initially as his pupil then becoming his assistant until 1870. While in this role he assisted on the construction of Penarth Dock, Cardiff (where he gained his first experience as resident engineer), Albert Dock, Hull, and in an assessment of the Caledonian Railway.

He helped take down his father's Hungerford Bridge with Sir John Hawkshaw, the chains being now at Clifton Suspension Bridge. He also conducted initial surveys for a Channel Tunnel, a project in which Hawkshaw was particularly interested.

Brunel is noted for a partnership from 1878 with Sir John Wolfe Barry, with whom he designed the Blackfriars Railway Bridge and (after Sir Horace Jones died) Tower Bridge over the River Thames in central London. The profit share in the partnership demonstrated Barry's leadership of the new firm with Brunel being limited to 10% of the partnership's net profit up to a gross income of £4,500 per annum.

It is for his role on Tower Bridge for which Brunel is best known. His first involvement dated back to 1878 when he prepared a case against Bazalgette's proposal for a low bridge for the Parliamentary Committee. After the death of Horace Jones, and the appointment of Barry to be in charge, Brunel was tasked with the detailed design of the bridge and then supervised the construction being led by Edward Cruttwell, the resident engineer.

Barry and Brunel's other works included the docks at Barry in south Wales and the Creagan Bridge, a railway bridge over the narrows of Loch Creran in Scotland (jointly credited to Wolfe Barry, Brunel and Edward Cruttwell). Sir Alexander Gibb was a pupil of Brunel and Wolfe Barry in 1895.

He also designed the SS Chauncy Maples, which was built in Glasgow in 1899 and transported overland to Lake Nyasa in Africa, where it served for more than one hundred years as a mission and hospital clinic.

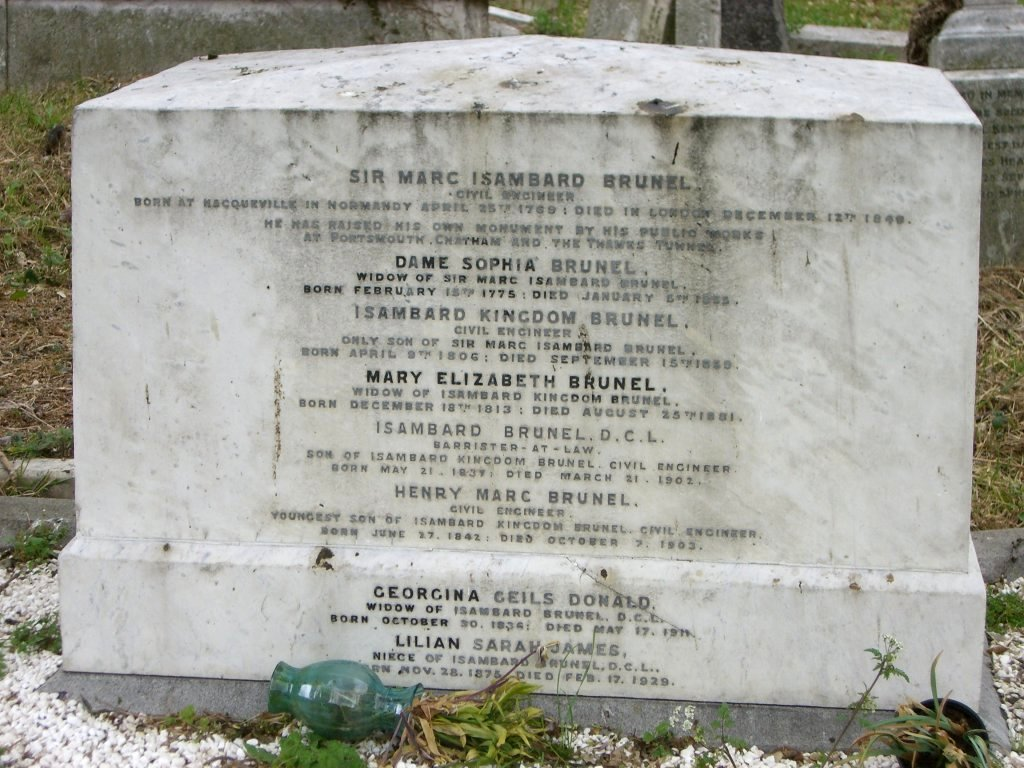
Brunel family grave in Kensal Green Cemetery.

== Institutions ==
Brunel was elected a Member of the Institution of Civil Engineers on 6 March 1877, and was a Member of the Institution of Mechanical Engineers and Institution of Naval Architects.

== Personal life ==
Brunel developed an interest in acting as a hobby, becoming a member of the Scientific and Amateur Dramatic Societies, and also contributed to his brother's biography of their father whose reputation he protected and promoted, working with his brother Isambard.

In Autumn 1901 Brunel suffered a stroke, and he died at his home 21 Abingdon Street, Westminster on 7 October 1903. He is buried with his father, grandfather, and other family members at Kensal Green Cemetery in London.

Brunel neither married nor had children and was the last of the Brunel engineering dynasty.
