= Patrick Cruttwell =

20th-century British literary scholar

Maurice James Patrick Cruttwell (17 March 1911 – 3 March 1990) was a British literary scholar. He received the Guggenheim Fellowship in 1968. His scholarly works include The Shakespearean Moment and The English Sonnet. His works of fiction include A Kind of Fighting. He was for many years a professor at Carleton University in Ottawa, Ontario, Canada, having previously taught at Kenyon College in Ohio and in California, both in the United States. Prior to that, he taught at Exeter University College in the United Kingdom and prior to the Second World War at Rangoon University in Burma. He edited the Penguin collected writings of Samuel Johnson as well as writing extensively on Shakespeare.

Cruttwell was born in Tezpur, Assam in British India, the son of a tea planter. He was educated at Edinburgh Academy. He died in Cambridge, aged 78.
