= Edward Cruttwell =

English civil engineer for Tower Bridge

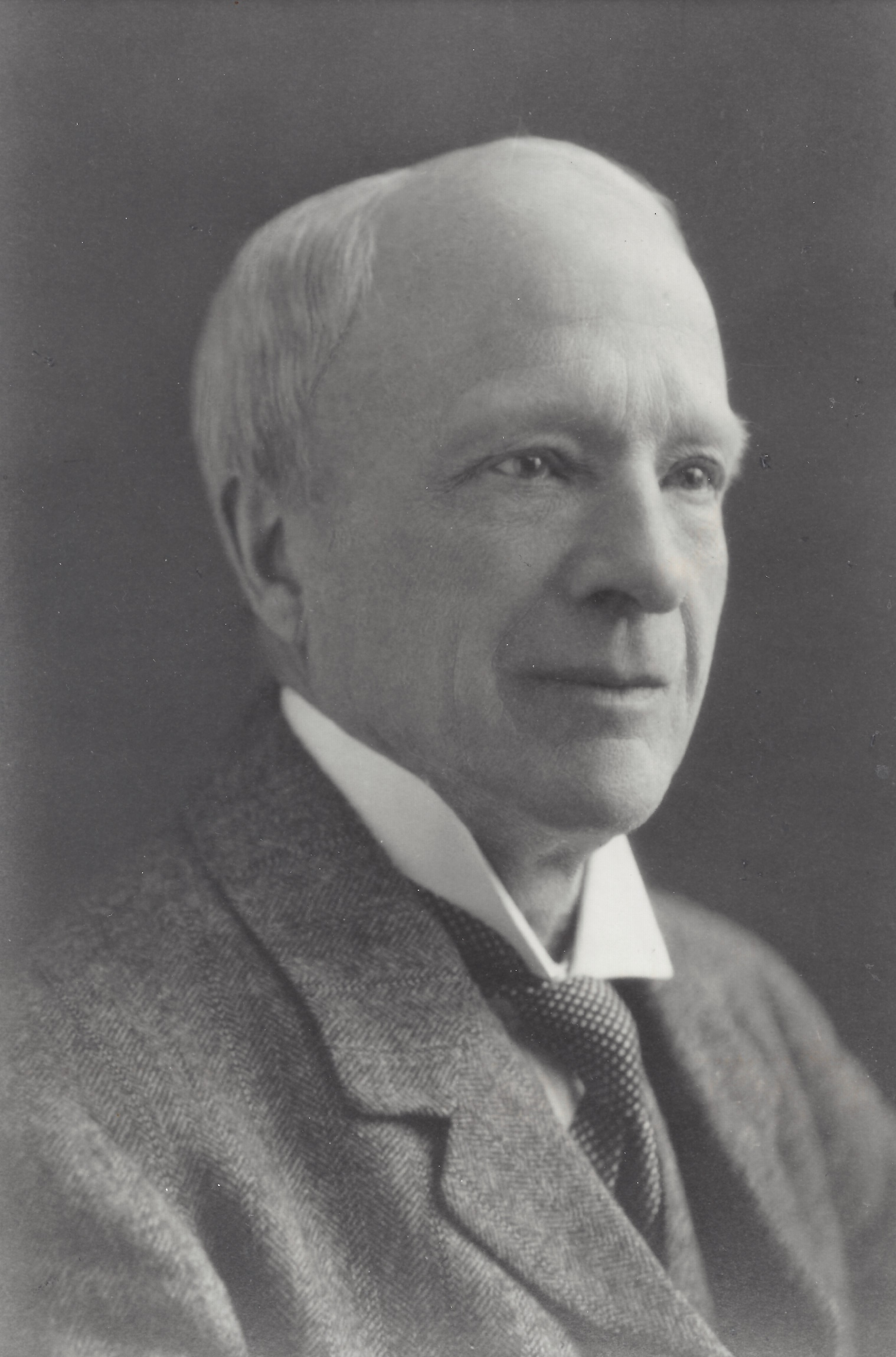
- Born: 5 December 1857; Frome, England
- Died: 10 November 1933 (aged 75); Leatherhead, England
- Education: Clifton College; King's College, London
- Engineering career
- Discipline: Civil
- Institutions: Institution of Civil Engineers; Institution of Mechanical Engineers; Engineering Institute of Canada
- Projects: Blackfriars Railway Bridge, Tower Bridge
- Significant design: Connel Bridge

George Edward Wilson Cruttwell (5 December 1857 – 10 November 1933) was an English civil engineer. He worked with John Wolfe Barry and Henry Marc Brunel, was the resident engineer in charge of the construction, and then first superintending engineer, of Tower Bridge in London, and remained associated with Tower Bridge until his death in 1933. He became an internationally renowned bridge engineer while also working on docks, harbours, railways and other infrastructure.

== Early life and education ==
Cruttwell was born on 5 December 1857 to Wilson Clement Cruttwell, a solicitor, and Georgiana Daniel, in Frome, Somerset. One of 11 children, his youngest sister was art historian and critic Maud Cruttwell. Like his brothers, he was educated at Clifton College from 1869 to 1874, then King's College London. After graduating, in October 1876 he was apprenticed to railway engineer Robert Pearson Brereton who was responsible for completing many of Isambard Kingdom Brunel's projects after his death in 1859.

== Career ==
Cruttwell spent a year in Brereton's office before being assigned to harbour, railway and dock works for the Neath Harbour Commissioners as assistant resident engineer under one of Brereton's engineers, William Bell.

Cruttwell was only with Brereton until 1878 (or 1879) when he joined the firm of Sir John Wolfe Barry and Henry Marc Brunel. He initially spent four years working in Barry's and Brunel's office. But aged 25 he was appointed resident engineer responsible for the construction of Blackfriars Railway Bridge, a role he held between 1883 and 1886.

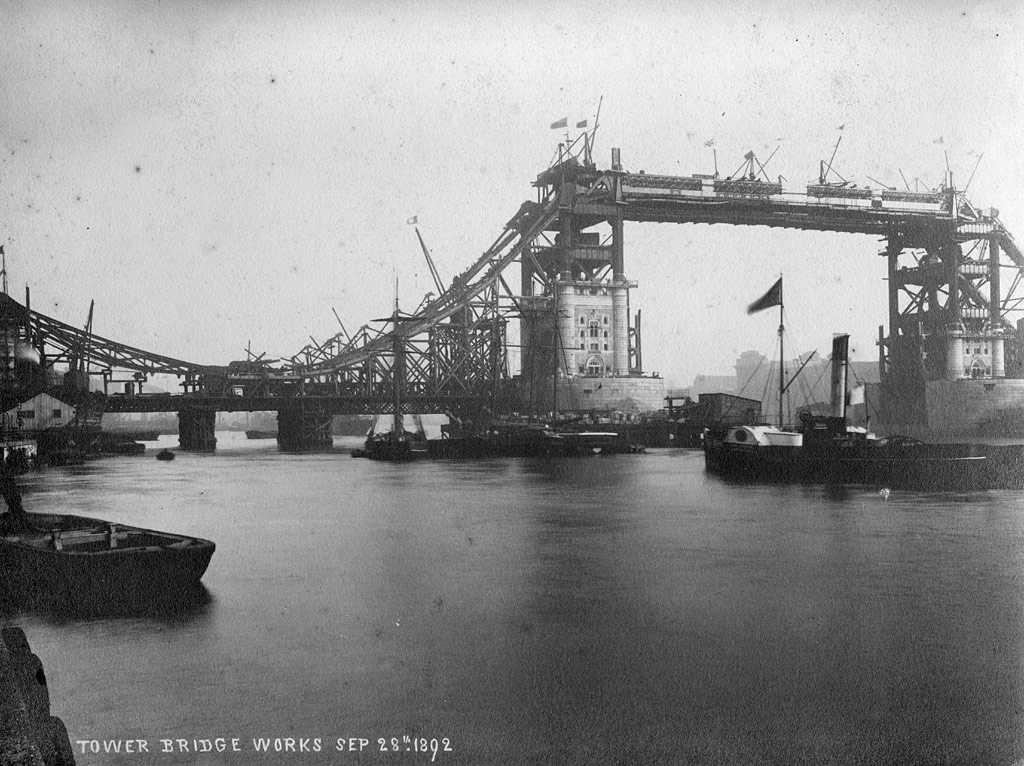
Tower Bridge under construction, 1892

In 1886, Barry offered Cruttwell the choice of either becoming his personal assistant or the resident engineer at Tower Bridge. Cruttwell chose Tower Bridge and it was in this role he achieved national prominence as the engineer in charge of its construction from its inception in 1886 to its opening on 30 June 1894. Appointed to that post aged 28, Cruttwell was credited alongside Wolfe Barry (the bridge's chief engineer) with the work on the Bridge having "proceeded entirely under Mr Barry and his able resident engineer Mr Cruttwell." In 1898, after working for Wolfe Barry and Brunel for 16 years, Cruttwell was nominated to become a member of the Institution of Mechanical Engineers; Brunel summarised Cruttwell's career to that year:

"[He was educated] at King's College, London (Applied Science Department) from 1874 to 1876... From 1878 to 1894, Cruttwell was employed continuously by Mr (later Sir) John Wolfe Barry and Mr Henry Marc Brunel initially in their office, then in sole charge as resident engineer at Blackfriars Railway Bridge from 1883 to 1886, and then at the Tower Bridge from 1886 to 1894."

Cruttwell presented two substantial papers to the Institution of Civil Engineers on the construction of Tower Bridge which formed the basis of much of the current understanding of its engineering. On 28 March 1893 he presented a detailed paper on the foundations, while on 19 November 1896, he presented on the superstructure. The following month, in the usual discussion of papers previously presented, Cruttwell robustly defended Tower Bridge from its engineering critics, noting in reply to one who suggested that the failure to make it a railway bridge would mean it would have to be pulled down that "As for the day coming when the bridge would have to be pulled down, he could only say it would be a very good thing for engineers, as it would give them some work to do."

After Tower Bridge was opened, the Corporation of London "secured the services of Mr E W Cruttwell who so very ably filled the post of resident engineer during the whole period of construction" as the engineer in charge of the now operational Tower Bridge, for which he received £500 per year. He retained this position until 1897 when the roles of engineer and bridge master were merged. Bridge House Estates also appointed him as engineer for Southwark and London bridges.

Also following the opening, the Tower Bridge Subway Company that operated the Tower Subway, a pedestrian tunnel that was the only previous means of crossing the Thames east of London Bridge, sued the Corporation of the City of London for £30,000 for loss of revenue. Cruttwell was one of the key witnesses in the arbitration arguing that the claim was unfounded with the Subway being in a "very neglected condition."

=== Sole practice ===
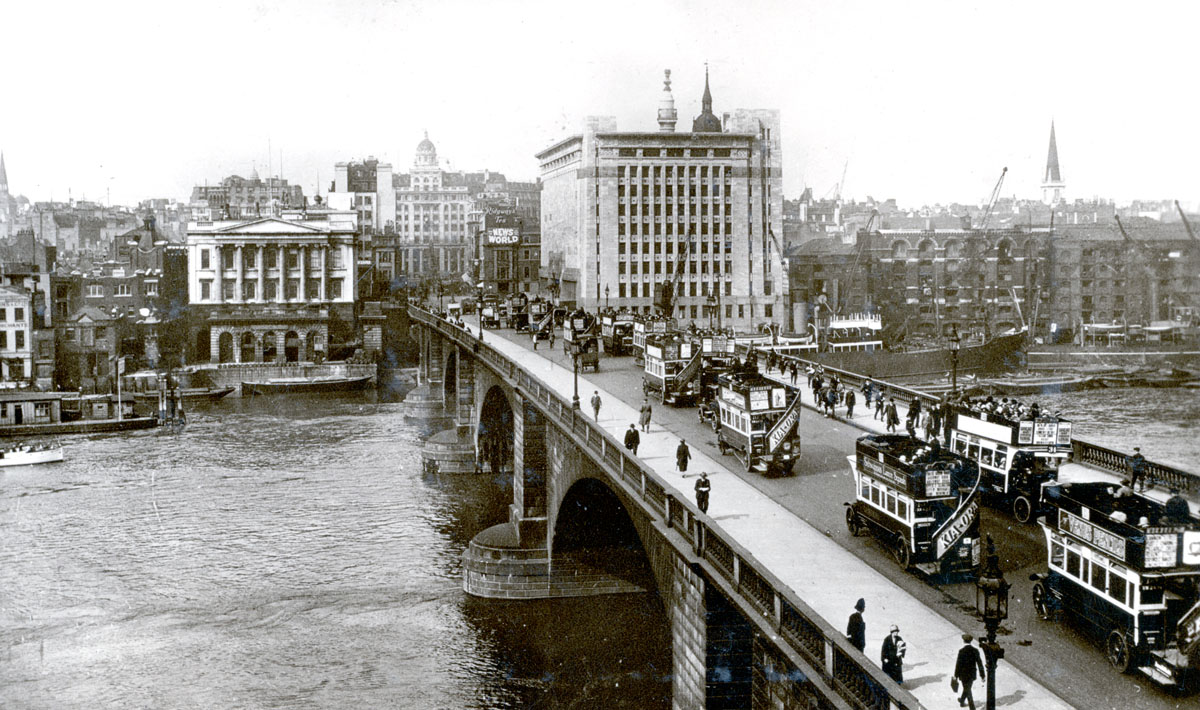
The widened 'New London Bridge' (1927)

Retaining the role of consulting engineer to Tower Bridge (a position he held until he died in 1933), Cruttwell went into independent practice at 14 Delahay Street, Westminster, in 1897. He became consulting engineer for railways and bridges for the Orange Free State.

In 1900, Cruttwell and architect Andrew Murray were engaged by Bridge House Estates to widen the 'New London Bridge' (built in 1831) from 53 feet 5 inches (16.28 m) to 65 feet 0 inches (19.81 m) to cope with increased traffic. The work, which involved new footways mounted on granite corbels, was carried out between 1902 and 1904 and was completed without closing the bridge. (In 1968, the granite cladding of the bridge was sold to an American industrialist and transported to the United States for use in the construction of a new bridge in Lake Havasu City in Arizona; the current London Bridge was opened in 1973.)

In 1901, Cruttwell won a £1,000 first prize for his design for Sydney Harbour Bridge, though for financial and political reasons, his design was not constructed. Construction of his design would have been more than twice as expensive as the competition's second-placed design by Norman Selfe, though a committee of experts reported that none of the designs were satisfactory. (A second competition in 1902 was won by Selfe but construction of his design never started due to an economic slowdown and a 1904 change of government.)

=== Sir John Wolfe Barry & Partners ===
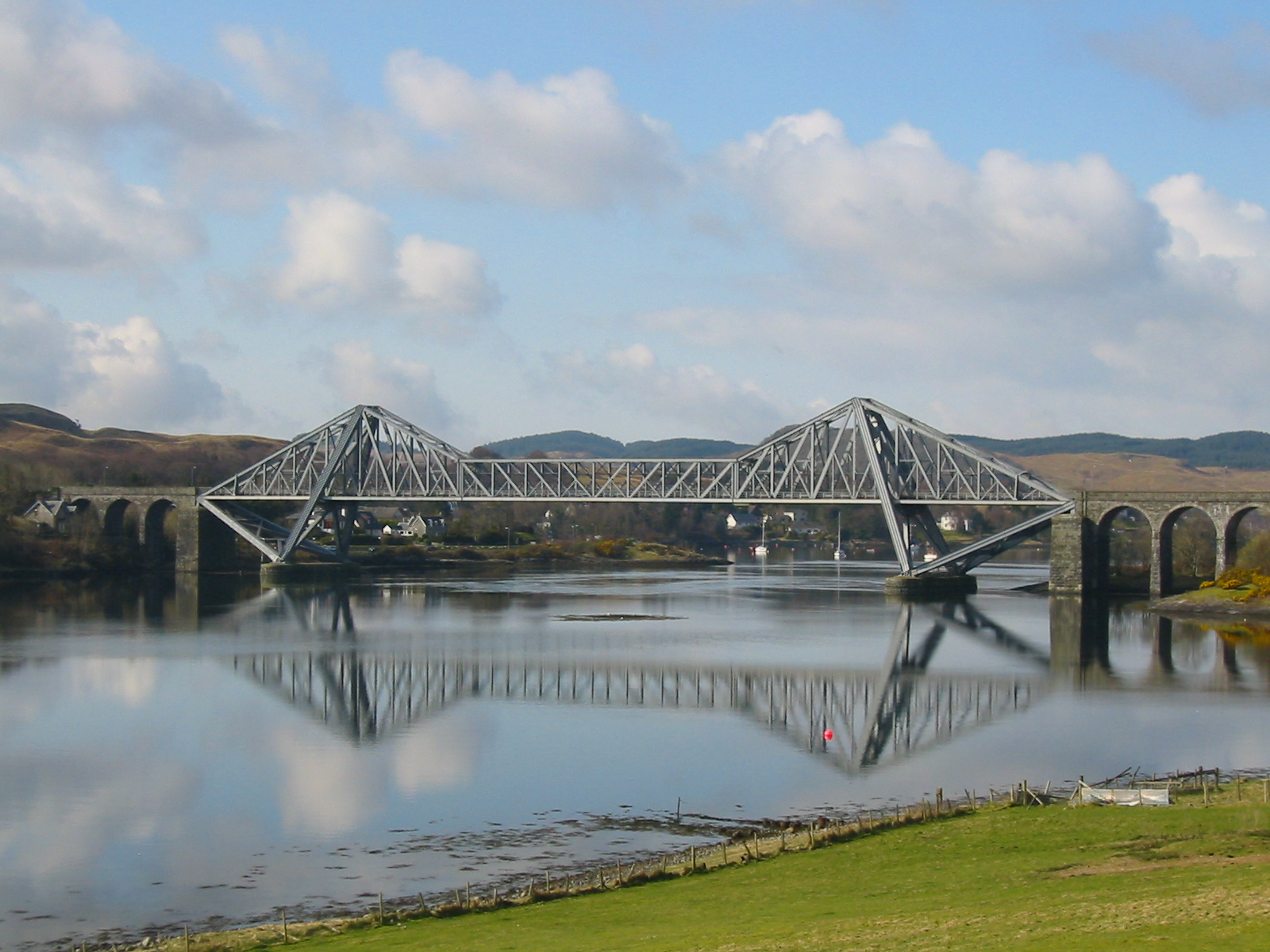
Connel Bridge

In 1901, Cruttwell was invited by Sir John Wolfe Barry to rejoin his firm as Barry's partner. Cruttwell took responsibility for various harbour and docks projects, overseeing designs for bridges, cranes and machinery at Grangemouth, Grimsby, Immingham, Middlesbrough and Newport docks. He was resident engineer on the Connel Bridge in Scotland, and spent time in India where he was responsible for various bridges on the Bengal Nagpur Railway.

With fellow partner, and Wolfe Barry's second son Kenneth Arthur Wolfe Barry, Cruttwell surveyed over six hundred miles (966 km) of canals and inland navigations for the Royal Commission on Canals and Waterways in 1908 and 1909. By 1911 Cruttwell's name as "someone who occupies a high place in the engineering profession" was known more widely around the world with his arrival in Canada warranting a headline in the Canadian press when Cruttwell arrived to design the Second Narrows Bridge in Vancouver. In 1912 he designed an ingenious hydraulic drawbridge over the River Hull.

Cruttwell's expertise on bridges, docks and rivers would be called on more widely, and nationally, for engineering projects not designed by him or his firm. For example, in May 1911 he was expert witness to the Select Committee of the House of Lords investigating complaints regarding Dundee Harbour. In November 1912 he was advising the inquiry over whether a five miles per hour speed limit should be imposed on Richmond Bridge being noted as "the bridge engineer of the eminent firm of Sir John Wolfe Barry." In May 1914, he was before the inquiry into the impacts of the extraction of water from the River Forth to supply Glasgow. Later that year, in November, he was tasked with providing an independent expert assessment to assist in an arbitration case regarding the Royal Edward Dock in Avonmouth.

In 1912, Cruttwell's firm of Sir John Wolfe Barry and Partners, which included Sir John Wolfe Barry, Cruttwell and Kenneth Arthur Wolfe Barry, was dissolved and reformed effective 1 January 1913 with the addition of Anthony George Lyster, who was elected President of the Institution of Civil Engineers in that year. In 1913, Cruttwell, with John and K A Wolfe Barry and Lyster, was commissioned to report on "'dockizing' the navigable Cut" at Neath Harbour.

During World War I, Cruttwell oversaw the contracts departments at the Department of Explosives Supply. After Sir John Wolfe Barry died in 1918, Cruttwell became senior partner in Sir John Wolfe Barry & Partners, by then long-established as a "world-famous engineering firm". He continued to travel widely for major engineering projects around the world, in 1923 arriving in Sydney to tender for Sydney Harbour Bridge with his arrival heralded as the "famous designer arrives." In 1925 he became consulting engineer to the Imperial War Graves Commission which was responsible for all war graves for troops killed during the First World War.

=== Legacy ===
In June 2024, previously unseen photographs of Tower Bridge when it first opened to the public, discovered by family descendants of Cruttwell, were displayed on monoliths in an open-air exhibition across the Bridge. These photographs and the exhibition formed the centrepiece of "Launching A Landmark", a celebration of the 130th anniversary of Tower Bridge's opening, which also saw the release of a new website highlighting the role of Edward Cruttwell in the building of the Tower Bridge as well as more information about Cruttwell's life unearthed by his family.

== Institutions ==
Proposed by Henry Brunel for membership of the Institution of Mechanical Engineers in 1898, Cruttwell's growing reputation was indicated by those seconding his application which included the noted engineers Beauchamp Tower and Charles Hawksley as well as John Wolfe Barry.

Prior to Cruttwell's membership of the IME, he was an associate member of the Institution of Civil Engineers from 1883, and became a full member in March 1888. He won two Telford Premiums and a George Stephenson Medal for 1890s papers about the design of Tower Bridge. In 1912, he became a member of the Engineering Institute of Canada.

== Personal life ==
Cruttwell was married to Gwenydd Erskine on 21 December 1893 at Bapchild in Kent. Cruttwell had met Erskine through Erskine's brother George Erskine who had been apprenticed to William Bell when Cruttwell was assistant resident engineer at Neath Harbour. The Cruttwells had three sons: Clement Henry, born on 16 July 1896; Patrick Erskine, born on 28 June 1899; and Colin Edward, born on 19 March 1901.

He was a supporter of women's suffrage. It was noted in 1909 that he had "written to the three members of parliament in whose constituencies he is entitled to vote...[and] promised to place his votes at the next election in favour of the W.S.P.U."

A keen sailor, he obtained his Yacht Master's Certificate in 1889 for his own yacht Mona, a double masted yawl of 19 tons.

During his career, Cruttwell accumulated considerable wealth. In 1911, his main residence was Bayfield House, Little Bookham, near Leatherhead in Surrey, a substantial property with 45 acres and 15 bedrooms. From there he moved to Fox Mead, also in Little Bookham, and he would die in a nearby cottage called Rosemary in Clinton Road, Leatherhead.

By 1927 he had the 2024 equivalent of around £5 million and owned several properties, but he lost most of his fortune (held in railway shares) during the Great Depression. Cruttwell died on 10 November 1933 of cerebral thrombosis and arteriosclerosis. His wife Gwenydd survived him and died on 11 January 1949.
