= Tower Bridge =

Bridge over the Thames in London, England

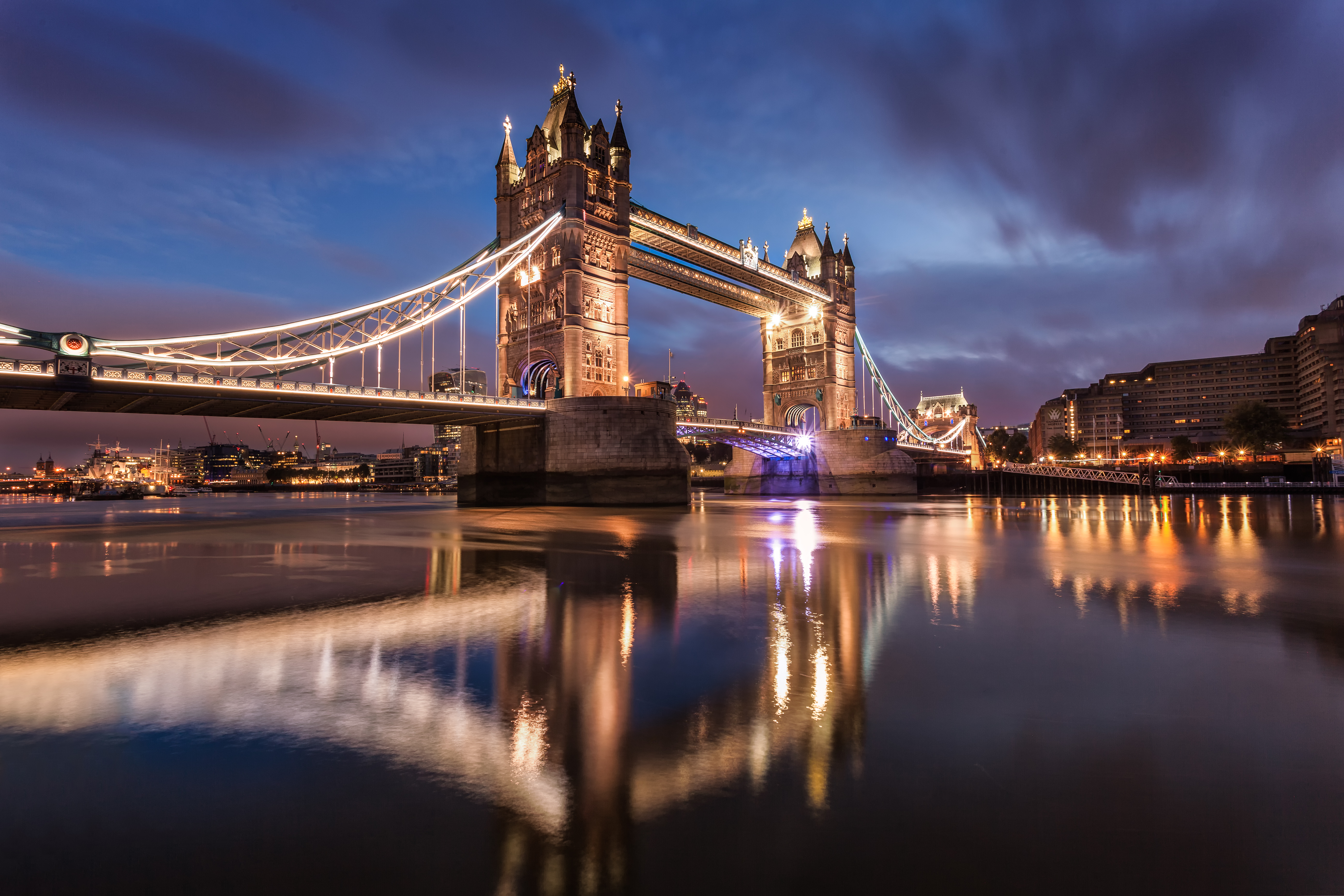
- View from Shad Thames
- Coordinates: 51°30′20″N 0°04′31″W
- Carries: London Inner Ring Road
- Crosses: River Thames
- Locale: London boroughs: – north side: Tower Hamlets – south side: Southwark
- Named for: Tower of London
- Maintained by: City Bridge Foundation, City of London Corporation
- Heritage status: Grade I listed building
- Website: towerbridge.org.uk
- Preceded by: London Bridge
- Followed by: Elizabeth II Bridge

Characteristics
- Design: Bascule bridge; Suspension bridge
- Total length: 940 ft (290 m)
- Height: 213 ft (65 m)

History
- Architect: Horace Jones
- Construction start: 22 April 1886
- Construction end: 30 June 1894
- Opened: 30 June 1894; 132 years ago

Location
- Interactive map of Tower Bridge

Tower Bridge is a Grade I listed combined bascule, suspension, and, until 1960, cantilever bridge in London, built between 1886 and 1894, designed by Horace Jones and engineered by John Wolfe Barry with the help of Henry Marc Brunel. It crosses the River Thames close to the Tower of London and is one of five London bridges owned and maintained by the City Bridge Foundation, a charitable trust founded in 1282.

The bridge was constructed to connect the 39% of London's population that lived east of London Bridge, equivalent to the populations of "Manchester on the one side, and Liverpool on the other", while allowing shipping to access the Pool of London between the Tower of London and London Bridge. The bridge was opened by Edward, Prince of Wales, and Alexandra, Princess of Wales, on 30 June 1894.

The bridge is 940 feet (290 m) in length including the abutments and consists of two 213-foot (65 m) bridge towers connected at the upper level by two horizontal walkways, and a central pair of bascules that can open to allow shipping. Originally hydraulically powered, the operating mechanism was converted to an electro-hydraulic system in 1972. The bridge is part of the London Inner Ring Road and thus the boundary of the London congestion charge zone, and remains an important traffic route with 40,000 crossings every day. The bridge deck is freely accessible to both vehicles and pedestrians, whereas the bridge's twin towers, high-level walkways, and Victorian engine rooms form part of the Tower Bridge Exhibition.

Tower Bridge has become a recognisable London landmark. It is sometimes confused with London Bridge, about 0.5 miles (800 m) upstream, which has led to a persistent urban legend about an American purchasing the wrong bridge.

== History ==
=== Inception ===
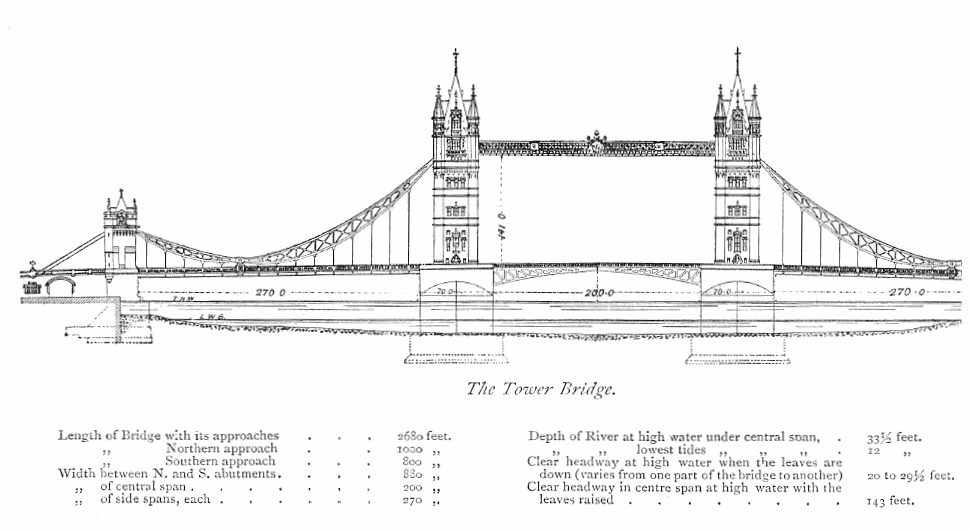
Elevation, with dimensions

By the late 19th century, the population and commercial development in the East End of London was increasing, leading to demand for a new river crossing downstream of London Bridge. A traditional fixed bridge at street level could not be built because it would cut off access by sailing ships to the port facilities in the Pool of London between London Bridge and the Tower of London.

A Special Bridge or Subway Committee chaired by Sir Albert Joseph Altman was formed in December 1875 to find a solution. On 7 December 1876, the Committee presented a report recommending a bridge or subway to the east of London Bridge should be constructed, funds permitting.

More than fifty designs were submitted, including one from civil engineer Sir Joseph Bazalgette, which was rejected because of a lack of sufficient headroom. None of the designs gained support and it was not until 24 July 1884 that the Bridge House Estates Committee brought forward a report that proposed "a low level bridge, with mechanical opening or openings" be built. Following a deputation from the Committee visiting Belgium, Holland, and Newcastle Bridge, a proposal was presented on 28 October 1884 to the Court of Common Council for a mechanical bridge built according to one of three models: Design A, a swing bridge; Design B, a variation of that swing bridge; and Design C a bascule bridge. Design C was recommended and a bill was prepared to present to Parliament.

=== Legislation ===
The act of Parliament authorising construction received royal assent on 14 August 1885 and is called the Corporation of London (Tower Bridge) Act 1885 (48 & 49 Vict. c. cxcv). The act was specific about the design of what it (and contemporary media) named "The Tower Bridge", rather than just "Tower Bridge". Key stipulations were:

1. The central opening span to be 200 feet clear width with a height of 135 feet above Trinity high water when open, and a height of 29 feet when closed.
2. The size of the piers to be 185 feet long and 70 feet wide.
3. The length of each of the two side spans to be 270 feet.
4. During construction a clear waterway of 160 feet wide had to be maintained for river traffic.
5. The design of the bridge should be made to accord with the architecture of the Tower of London.
6. The bridge was to be completed within 4 years from the passing of the act.
7. The bridge was to be opened at any time for the passage of any vessels, regardless of any delays to land traffic.

Barry later noted that "at one time it was intended that the new works should be made suitable for the mounting of guns and for military occupation." But that "The latter idea was afterwards to a great extent discarded." However, the act provided for "the senior officer commanding in the Tower [of London]...shall at all times have...the right to occupy the Tower Bridge."

The extent of the maritime trade conducted at this time between the site of Tower Bridge and London Bridge (a distance of approximately 0.5 miles) is demonstrated in Schedule B of the act which lists 11 active docks, quays and wharfs operating on the north side of the Thames, and 20 wharfs operating on the south side.

Corporation of London (Tower Bridge) Act 1889
- Act of Parliament
- Parliament of the United Kingdom
- Long title: An Act to alter amend and extend the Corporation of London (Tower Bridge) Act 1885 to extend the time limited for the construction of the works by that Act authorised to authorise the alteration of certain streets and for other purposes.
- Citation: 52 & 53 Vict. c. cxlix

Dates
- Royal assent: 12 August 1889
Other legislation
| Amends | Corporation of London (Tower Bridge) Act 1885 |

Text of statute as originally enacted

Corporation of London (Tower Bridge) Extension of Time Act 1893
- Act of Parliament
- Parliament of the United Kingdom
- Long title: An Act to extend the time for the completion of works authorised by the Corporation of London (Tower Bridge) Acts 1885 and 1889.
- Citation: 56 & 57 Vict. c. xciii

Dates
- Royal assent: 29 June 1893
Other legislation
| Amends | Corporation of London (Tower Bridge) Act 1885; Corporation of London (Tower Bridge) Act 1889 |

Text of statute as originally enacted

Two further acts of Parliament were required to extend the time allowed to complete the works. On 12 August 1889 the Corporation of London (Tower Bridge) Act 1889 (52 & 53 Vict. c. cxlix) received royal assent to extend the time allowed for construction by a further four years to 1893 and make various adjustments to neighbouring streets that had proved necessary. The work was not yet complete after those four years, and on 29 June 1893 the Corporation of London (Tower Bridge) Extension of Time Act 1893 (56 & 57 Vict. c. xciii) received royal assent extending the time by a further year.

=== Construction ===
Construction was funded by the City Bridge Foundation, a charity established in 1282 for maintenance of London Bridge that subsequently expanded to cover Tower Bridge, Blackfriars Bridge, Southwark Bridge and the Millennium Bridge.

Sir John Wolfe Barry was appointed engineer and Sir Horace Jones the architect (who, as the City Architect, was also one of the judges). Jones and Barry designed a bridge with two bridge towers built on piers. The central span was split into two equal bascules or leaves, which could be raised to allow river traffic to pass. The two side spans were suspension bridges, with rods anchored both at the abutments and through rods contained in the bridge's upper walkways.

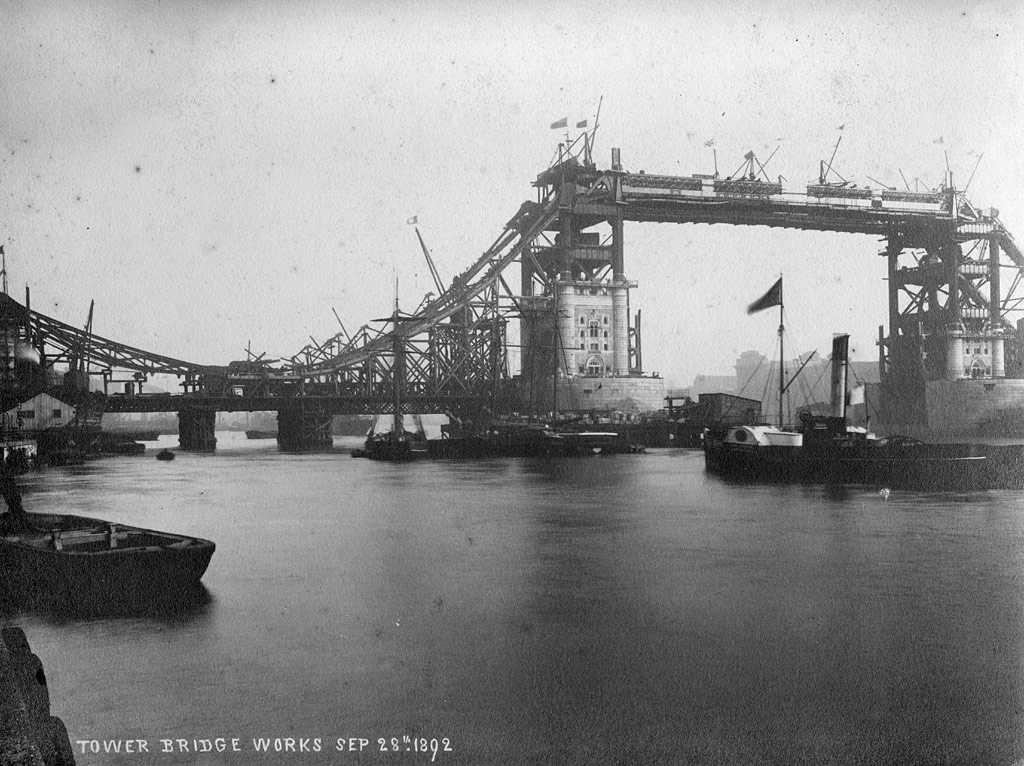
Tower Bridge under construction, 1892

Construction – overseen by Edward Cruttwell – started on 22 April 1886, with the foundation stone laid by the Prince of Wales on 21 June, and took eight years. The work was divided into eight contracts. Mr (later Sir) John Jackson won three of those contracts and was responsible for the northern approach to the bridge (which started in February 1887), the foundations of the piers and the abutments of the bridge (started February 1887), and the cast iron parapet for the northern approach (December 1887) at a total accepted tender cost of £189,732; Sir W. G. Armstrong, Mitchell, and Co. Ltd, was awarded the hydraulics contract for which they tendered £85,232 (December 1887); Mr William Webster was responsible for the southern approach at £38,383 (July 1888); Sir William Arrol & Co. had the contract for the metalwork of the superstructure at £337,113 (May 1889), which amounted to about 12,100 tons; Messrs Perry & Co won two contracts covering the masonry superstructure (May 1889), and paving and lighting (May 1892) for a total accepted tender of £179,455. The total accepted tender for the eight contracts was £830,005.

On average 432 people worked on the site, although at least 1,200 worked on its construction overall and received invitations to the entertainment provided for the workmen at its opening. Cruttwell was the resident engineer throughout the period of construction (and remained associated with the bridge until his death in 1933). He noted that there were "only" ten fatal accidents during the construction: four in sinking the foundations, one on the approaches, and the remaining five on the superstructure.

Two piers, containing over 70,000 long tons (78,400 short tons; 71,123 t) of concrete, were sunk into the riverbed to support the construction. The first caisson was started in September 1886 and it was not until January 1890 that both piers were complete. The reason for the long duration of the foundation works was the need to defer excavation of the second pier until the staging for the first pier had been removed to allow 160 feet of clear water-way for shipping.

More than 11,000 long tons (12,320 short tons; 11,177 t) of steel were used in the framework for the towers and walkways, which were then clad in Cornish granite and Portland stone to protect the underlying steelwork, and achieve the stipulation that the bridge should fit architecturally with the Tower of London.

Jones died in 1887, and Barry took over as architect. Barry later summarised the contributions to the construction of Tower Bridge: "Mr Fyson, who undertook much of the preparation of the detailed drawings; Mr Stevenson, who had been his assistant with the architectural work; and...most of all...Mr Cruttwell, the Resident Engineer, and Mr Homfray, who superintended the machinery." Stevenson replaced Jones's original brick façade with the more ornate Victorian Gothic style, which made the bridge a distinctive landmark and was intended to harmonise the bridge with the nearby Tower of London. The total cost of construction was £1,184,000 (equivalent to £133 million in 2025).

=== Opening ===
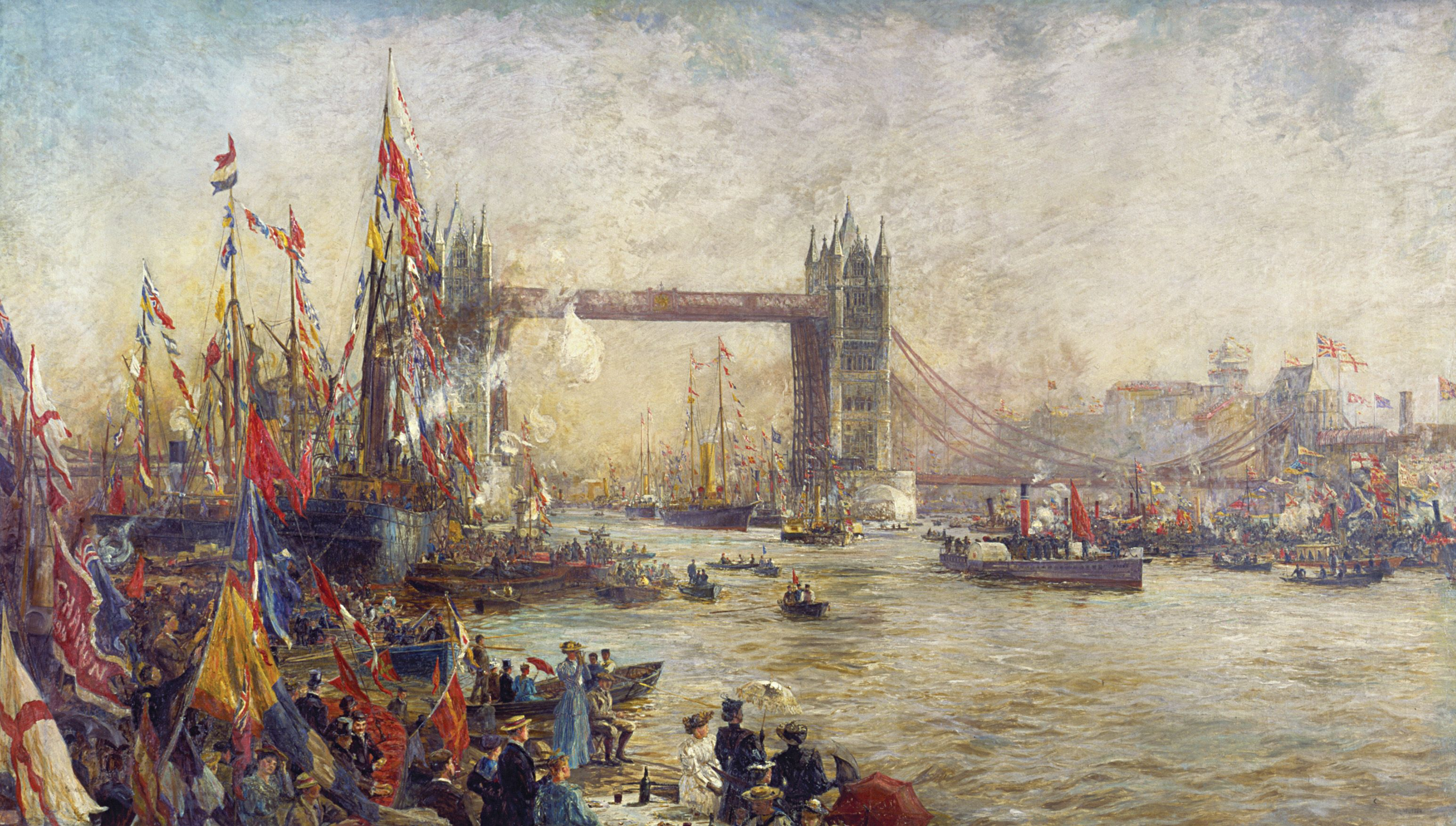
The Opening of Tower Bridge, 1895, William Lionel Wyllie

Tower Bridge was officially opened on 30 June 1894 by the Prince and Princess of Wales. The opening ceremony was attended by the Lord Chamberlain, the Lord Carrington and the Home Secretary, H. H. Asquith. It was reported that "few [pageants] have been more brilliant or will have a more abiding and historic interest" than the opening of Tower Bridge in the history of the City of London, and it was a "semi-State" occasion.

In addition to the official opening, the City of London Corporation gave an "entertainment", at a cost of £300, to 1,200 workmen and their wives. Edward Cruttwell, who had been in charge of the building of the bridge from the beginning, presided. After dinner, each workman was presented with a commemorative pipe and packet of tobacco, and each workman's wife with a box of sweetmeats.

An Act of Parliament stipulated that a tug boat should be on station to assist vessels in danger when crossing the bridge, a requirement that remained in place until the 1960s.

The bridge connected Iron Gate, on the north bank of the river, with Horselydown Lane, on the south – now known as Tower Bridge Approach and Tower Bridge Road, respectively. Until the bridge was opened, the Tower Subway – 0.25 mi (400 m) to the west – was the shortest way to cross the river from Tower Hill to Tooley Street in Southwark. Opened in 1870, Tower Subway was among the world's earliest underground ("tube") railways, but it closed after just three months and was reopened as a tolled pedestrian foot tunnel. Once Tower Bridge was open, the majority of foot traffic transferred to using the bridge, as there was no toll to cross. Having lost most of its income, the tunnel was closed in 1898.

The high-level open-air walkways between the towers gained a reputation for prostitutes and pickpockets. Since they were only accessible by stairs, the walkways were seldom used by regular pedestrians and were closed in 1910. The walkway reopened in 1982 as part of the Tower Bridge Exhibition.

=== 20th century ===
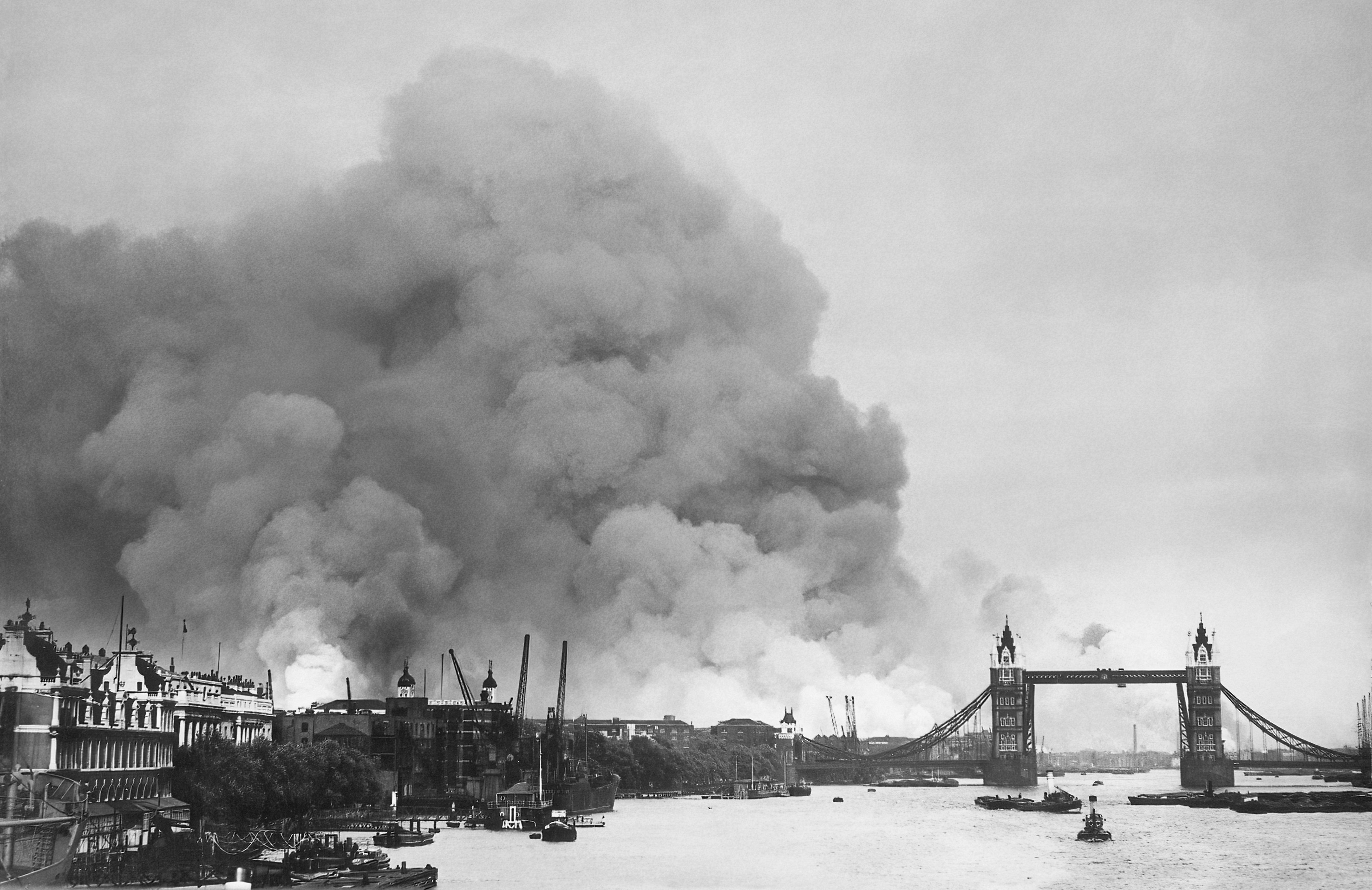
Tower Bridge during the first mass air raid on London, 7 September 1940

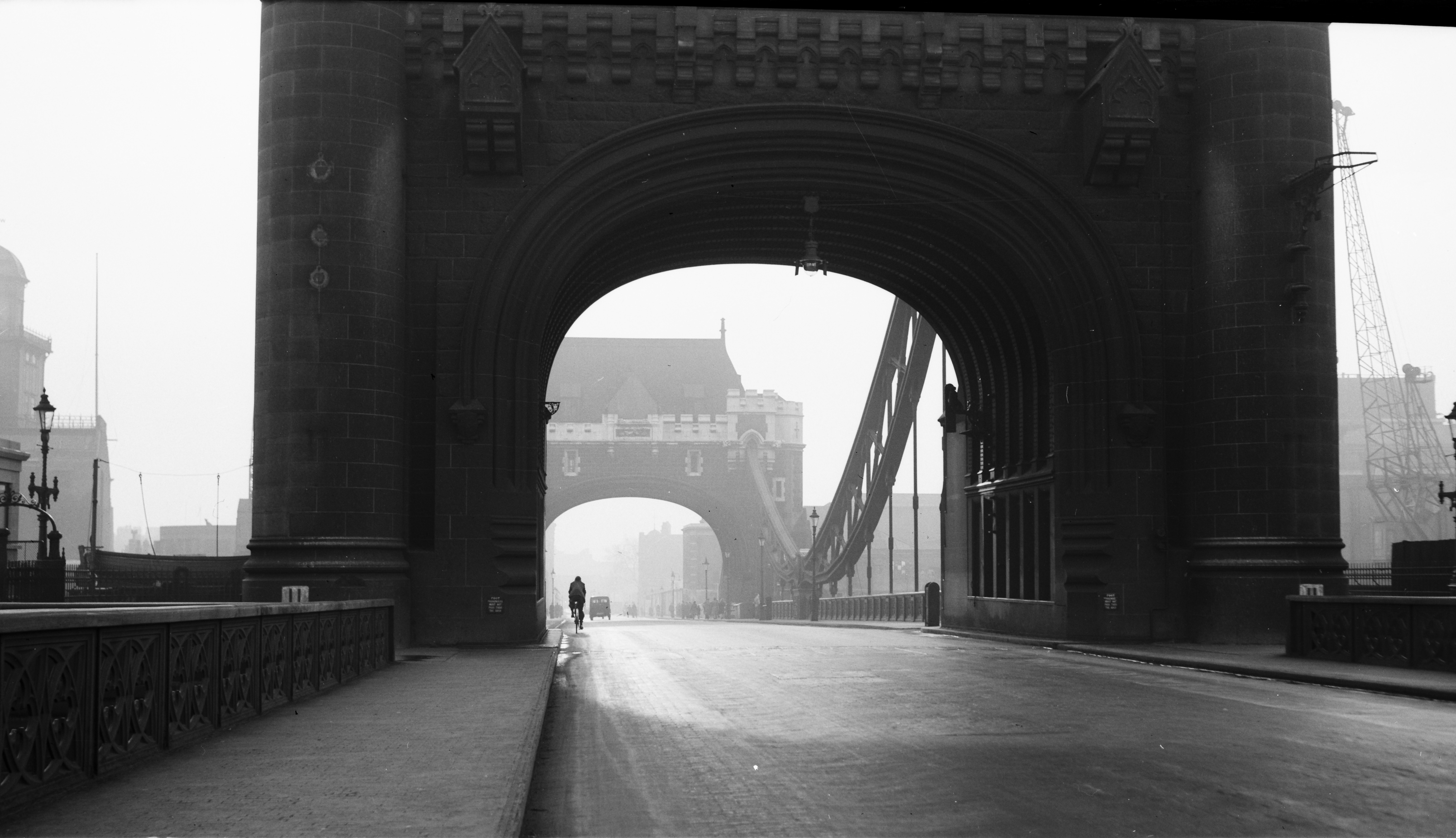
Tower Bridge in 1950

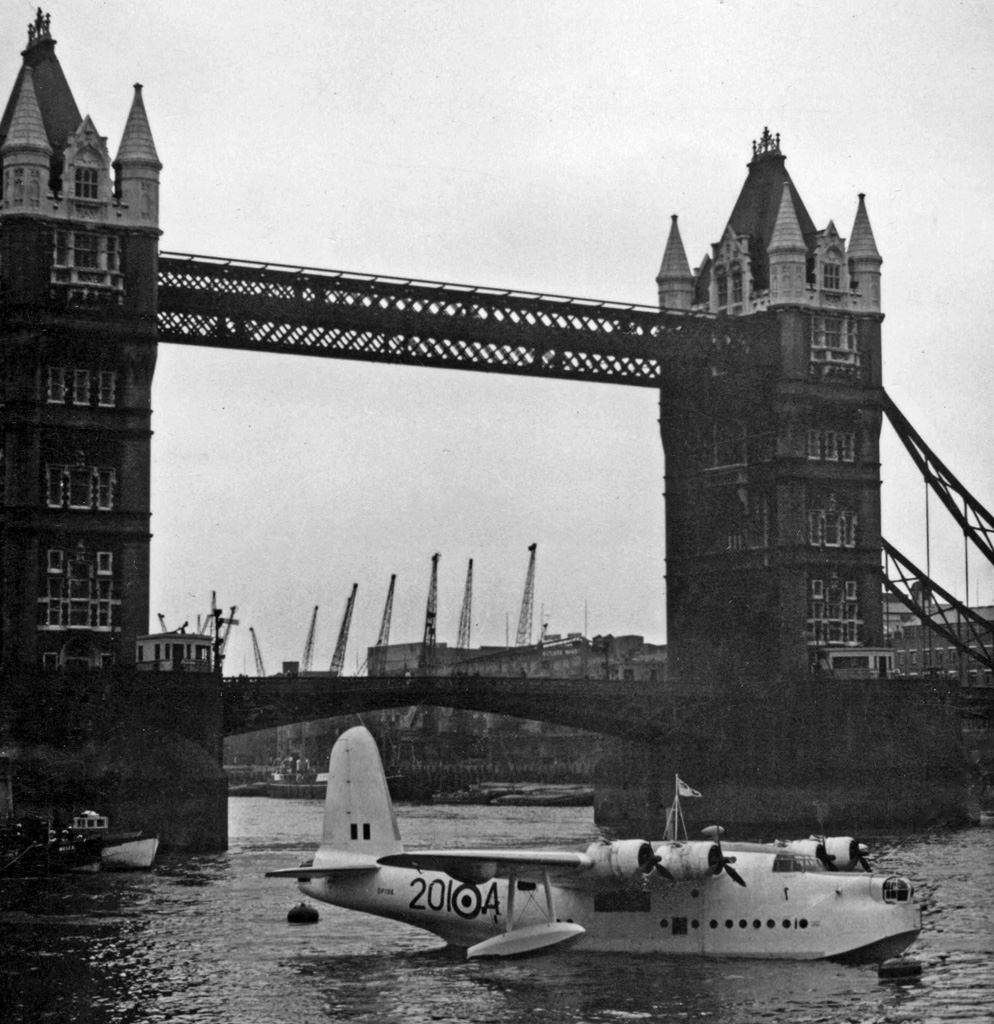
A Short Sunderland of No. 201 Squadron RAF moored at Tower Bridge during the 1956 commemoration of the Battle of Britain

After its opening, the City of London provided some funding to the police to pay for the policing of Tower Bridge, under an informal "compact". The Corporation of London (Blackfriars and other Bridges) Act 1906 (6 EdwVII c.clxxx) formally placed the bridge under the City of London's policing jurisdiction.

During the Second World War, Tower Bridge was seen as a major transport link to the Port of London, and consequently was a target for enemy action. In 1940, the high-level span took a direct hit, severing the hydraulic mechanism and taking the bridge out of action. In April 1941, a parachute mine exploded close to the bridge, causing serious damage to the bascule, towers, and engine room. In 1942, a third engine was installed in case the existing ones were damaged by enemy action. It was a 150 hp horizontal cross-compound engine, built by Vickers Armstrong Ltd. at their Elswick works in Newcastle upon Tyne. It was fitted with a flywheel having a 9-foot (2.7 m) diameter and weighing 9 tons, and was governed to a speed of 30 rpm. The engine became redundant when the rest of the system was modernised in 1974 and was donated to the Forncett Industrial Steam Museum by the City of London Corporation.

The southern section of the bridge, in the London Borough of Southwark, was Grade I listed on 6 December 1949. The remainder of the bridge, in the London Borough of Tower Hamlets, was listed on 27 September 1973.

In 1960, the upper bridges of the two pedestrian walkways that connected the two main towers were converted from being cantilever bridges, projecting horizontally out into space, to suspension bridges when suspension cables were added. This was to reinforce the strength of the walkways.

In 1974, the original operating mechanism was largely replaced by a new electro-hydraulic drive system, designed by Geoffrey Beresford Hartwell, of BHA Cromwell House, with the original final pinions driven by modern hydraulic motors.

In 1982, the Tower Bridge Exhibition opened, housed in the bridge's twin towers, the long-closed high-level walkways, and the Victorian engine rooms. The latter still houses the original steam engines and some of the original hydraulic machinery.

==== 1952 Tower Bridge bus jump incident ====
On 30 December 1952, a number 78 double-decker AEC bus approached Tower Bridge from the south bank, driven by Albert Gunter (1906–1968). At that time, the gateman would normally ring a warning bell and traffic lights would show red, before the bridge was raised. On this occasion the traffic lights were green, and there was no warning hand-bell and so Gunter proceeded onto the bridge, even though it was about to lift. The bus was near the end of the south bascule when it started to rise. Gunter, a former wartime British Army tank driver, made a split-second decision to accelerate the bus, clearing a 3-foot (1 m) gap to drop 6 feet (2 m) drop onto the north bascule, which had not started to rise. In the resulting landing, there were no serious injuries; the conductor broke his leg and twelve of the twenty passengers aboard received minor injuries. Gunter was later rewarded with a £10 bonus (about £246.81 in 2025) by the City Corporation to honour his act of bravery and quick thinking.

=== 21st century ===
The bridge closed for a month in 2000 to repair the bascules and perform other maintenance. A computer system was installed to control the raising and lowering of the bascules remotely. However, the system proved unreliable, resulting in the bridge being stuck in the open or closed positions on several occasions during 2005 until its sensors were replaced.

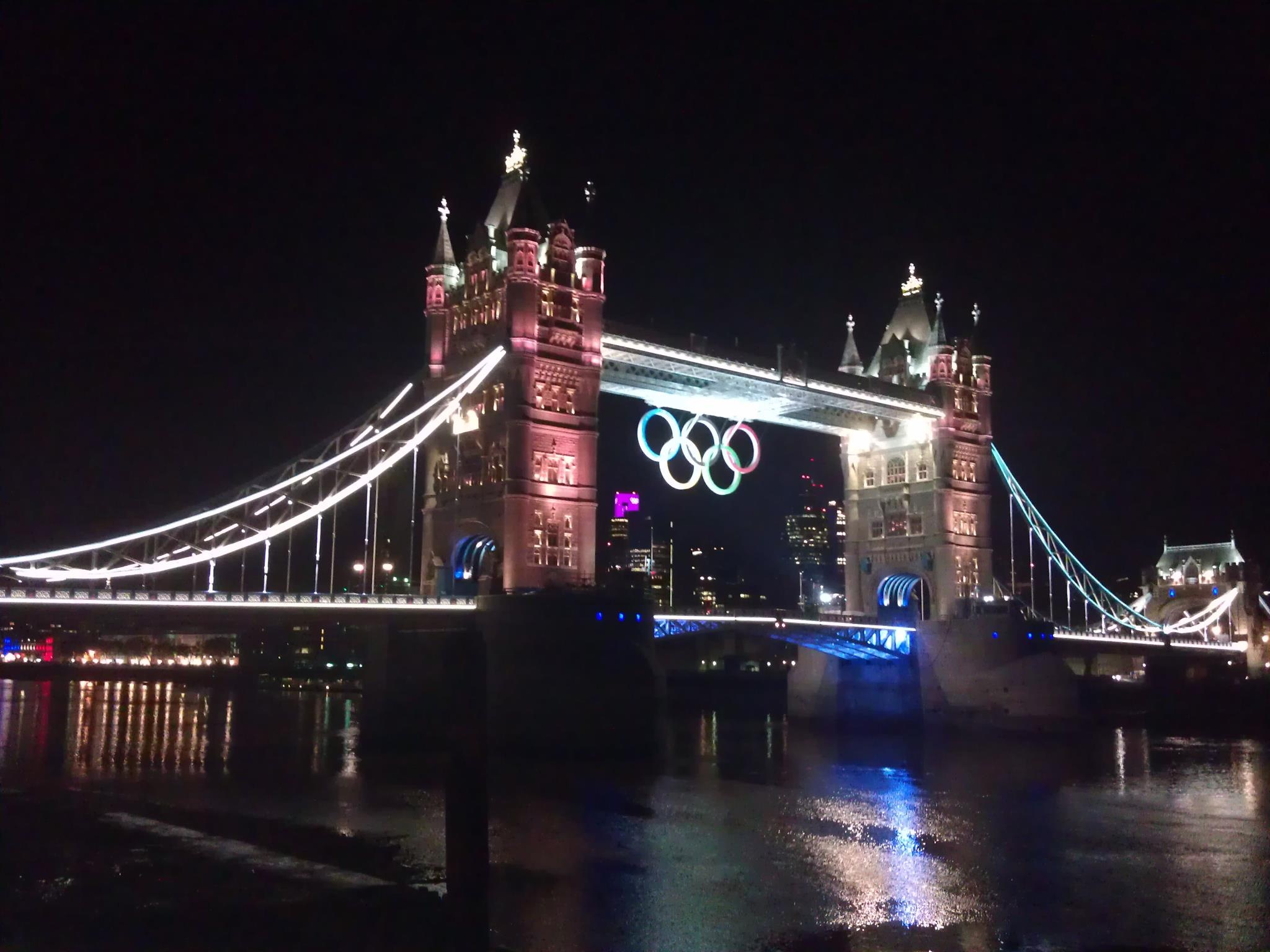
Tower Bridge with Olympic Rings during the 2012 London Olympics

In April 2008, authorities announced that the bridge would undergo a £4 million refurbishment that would take four years to complete. The work entailed stripping existing paint down to bare metal and repainting in blue and white. Before this, the bridge's colour scheme dated from 1977, when it was painted red, white, and blue for Queen Elizabeth II's Silver Jubilee. Its colours were subsequently restored to blue and white. Each section was enshrouded in scaffolding and plastic sheeting to prevent the old paint falling into the Thames and causing pollution. Starting in mid-2008, contractors worked on a quarter of the bridge at a time to minimise disruption, but some road closures were inevitable. The completed work should stand for 25 years. The renovation of the walkway interior was completed in mid-2009. The renovation of the four suspension chains was completed in March 2010 using a state-of-the-art coating system requiring up to six different layers of paint. A lighting system based on RGB LED luminaires was installed, concealed within the bridge superstructure, and attached without drilling holes, owing to the bridge's Grade I listing.

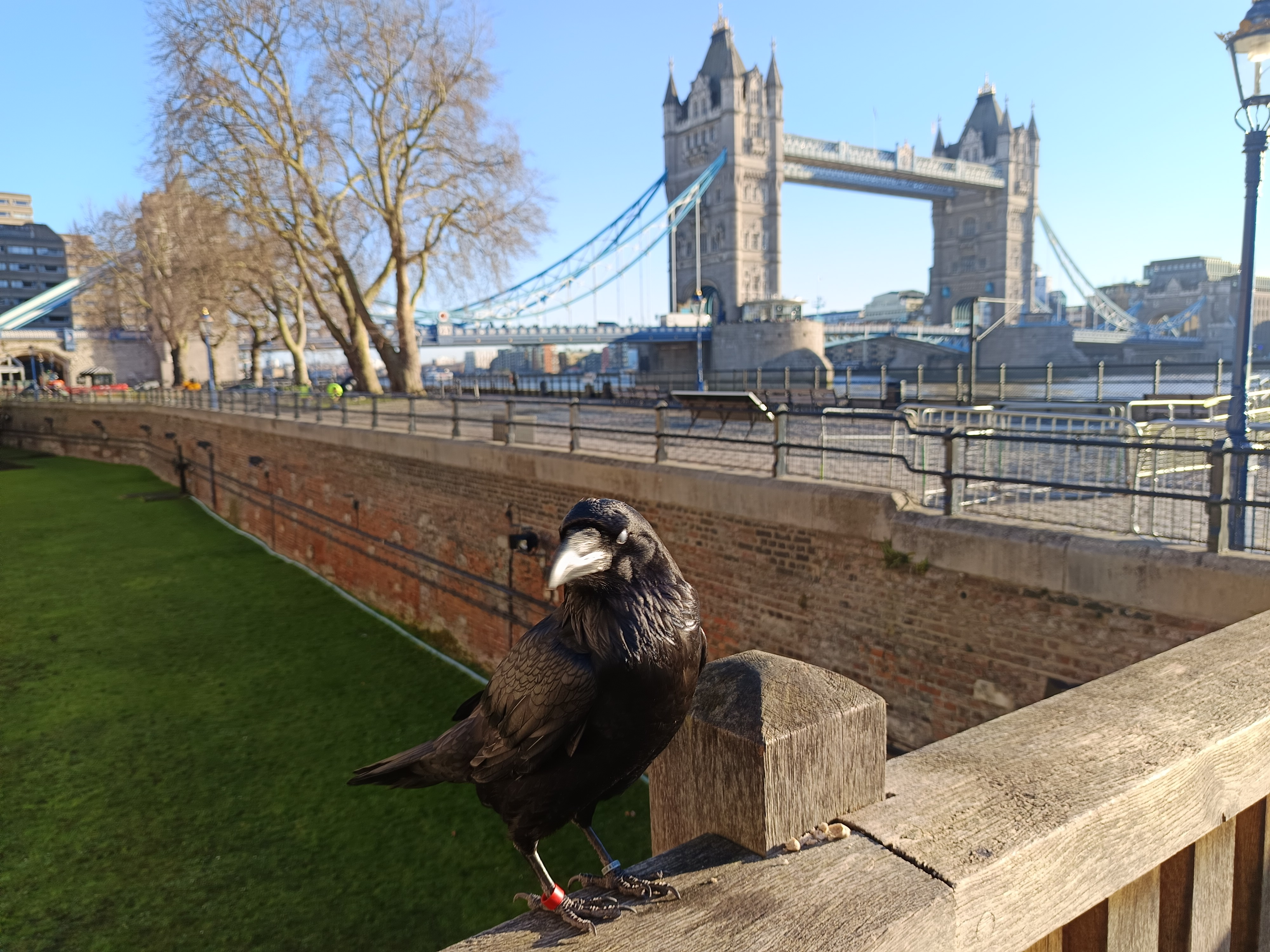
Tower Bridge viewed from the Tower of London in 2025, with one of the ravens of the Tower of London perched near the outer walls

On 8 July 2012, as part of the London Olympics, the west walkway was transformed into a 200-foot-long (61 m) Live Music Sculpture by the British composer Samuel Bordoli. Thirty classical musicians were arranged along the length of the bridge 138 feet (42 m) above the Thames behind the Olympic rings. The sound travelled backward and forwards along the walkway, echoing the structure of the bridge.

Following the Olympics, the rings were removed from Tower Bridge and replaced by the emblem of the Paralympic Games for the 2012 Summer Paralympics.

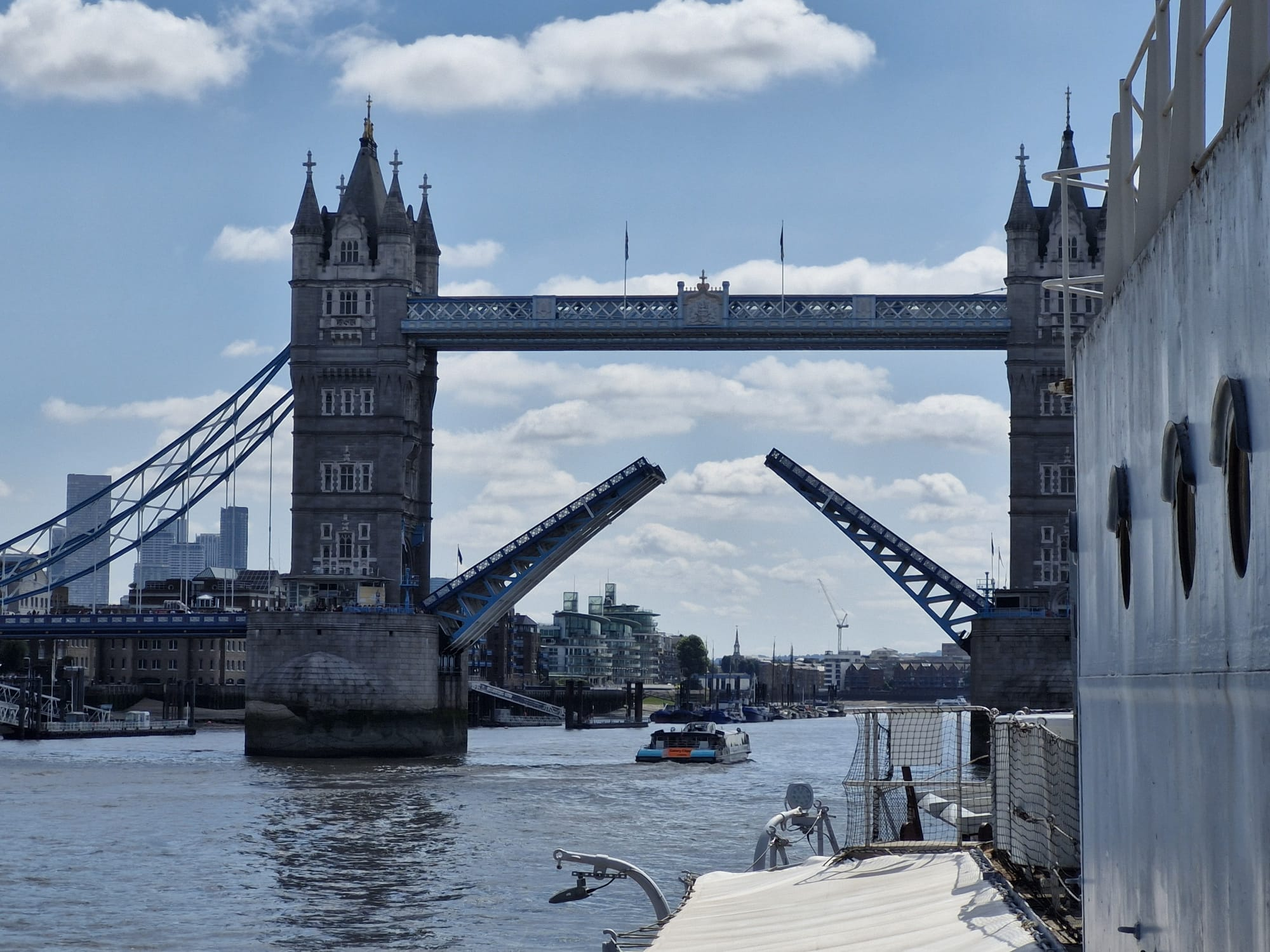
Tower Bridge being raised from the view point of HMS Belfast, in Summer 2025

In 2016, Tower Bridge was closed to all road traffic from 1 October to 30 December. This was to allow structural maintenance work to take place on the timber decking, lifting mechanism and waterproofing the brick arches on the bridge's approaches. During this, the bridge was still open to waterborne traffic. It was open to pedestrians for all but three weekends when a free ferry service was in operation.

== Design ==
=== Structure ===
The structure was originally designed by Horace Jones but his design had an arch instead of the current high-level footways. Concerns about ships' masts and rigging hitting the arch meant that his design faced objections and Jones "began to think that the arched form must be given up". It was at this point in 1885 that John Wolfe Barry partnered with Jones and developed the concept of the "level soffit for the upper bridge" which allowed the design to proceed as it stands today. Unusually, Tower Bridge was designed to include three types of bridge: the two spans from the shore to the piers are a suspension bridge; the central, opening span is a bascule bridge; and the high level walkways were cantilever bridges until converted to suspension bridges in 1960.

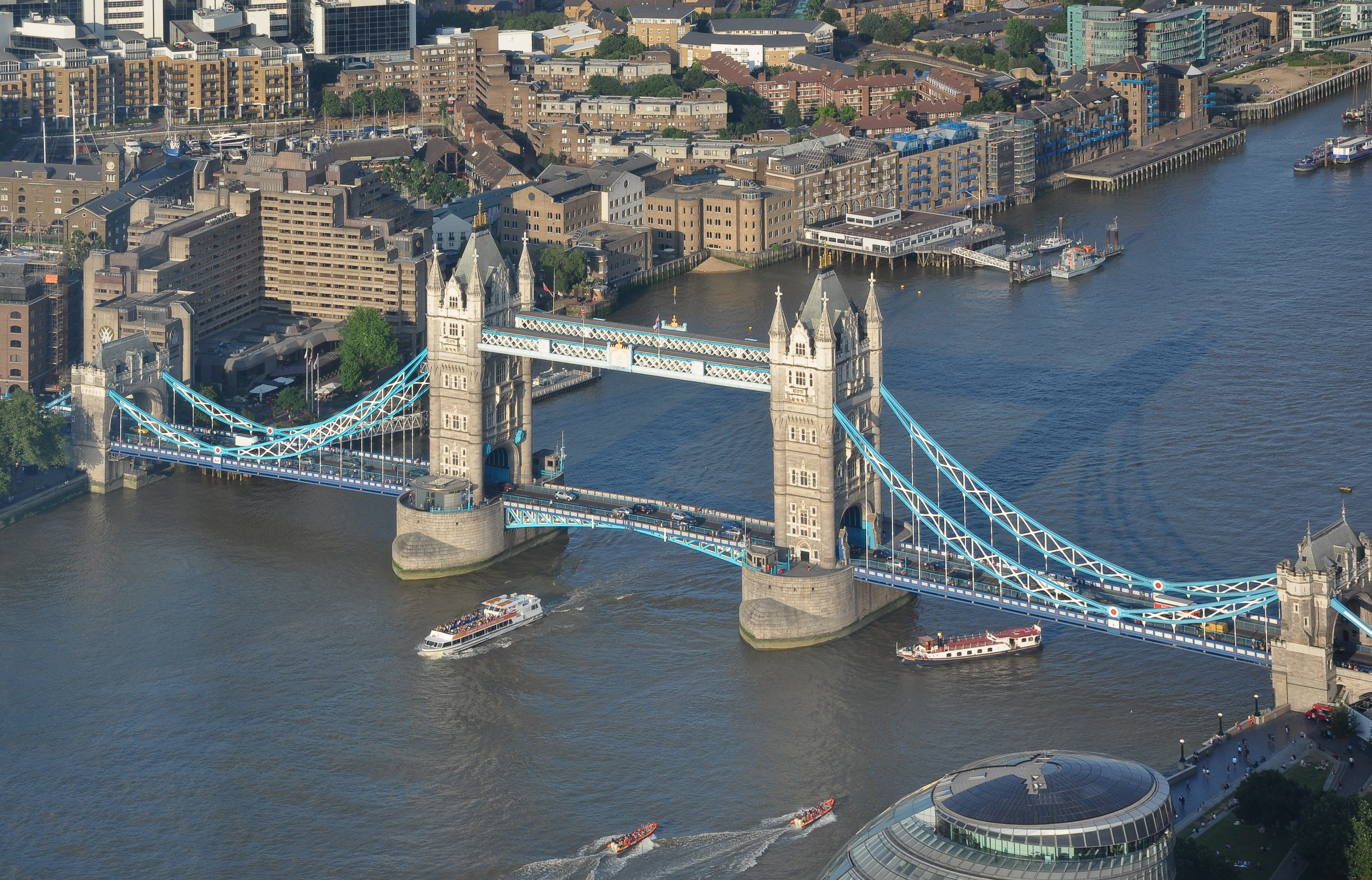
Aerial view of Tower Bridge

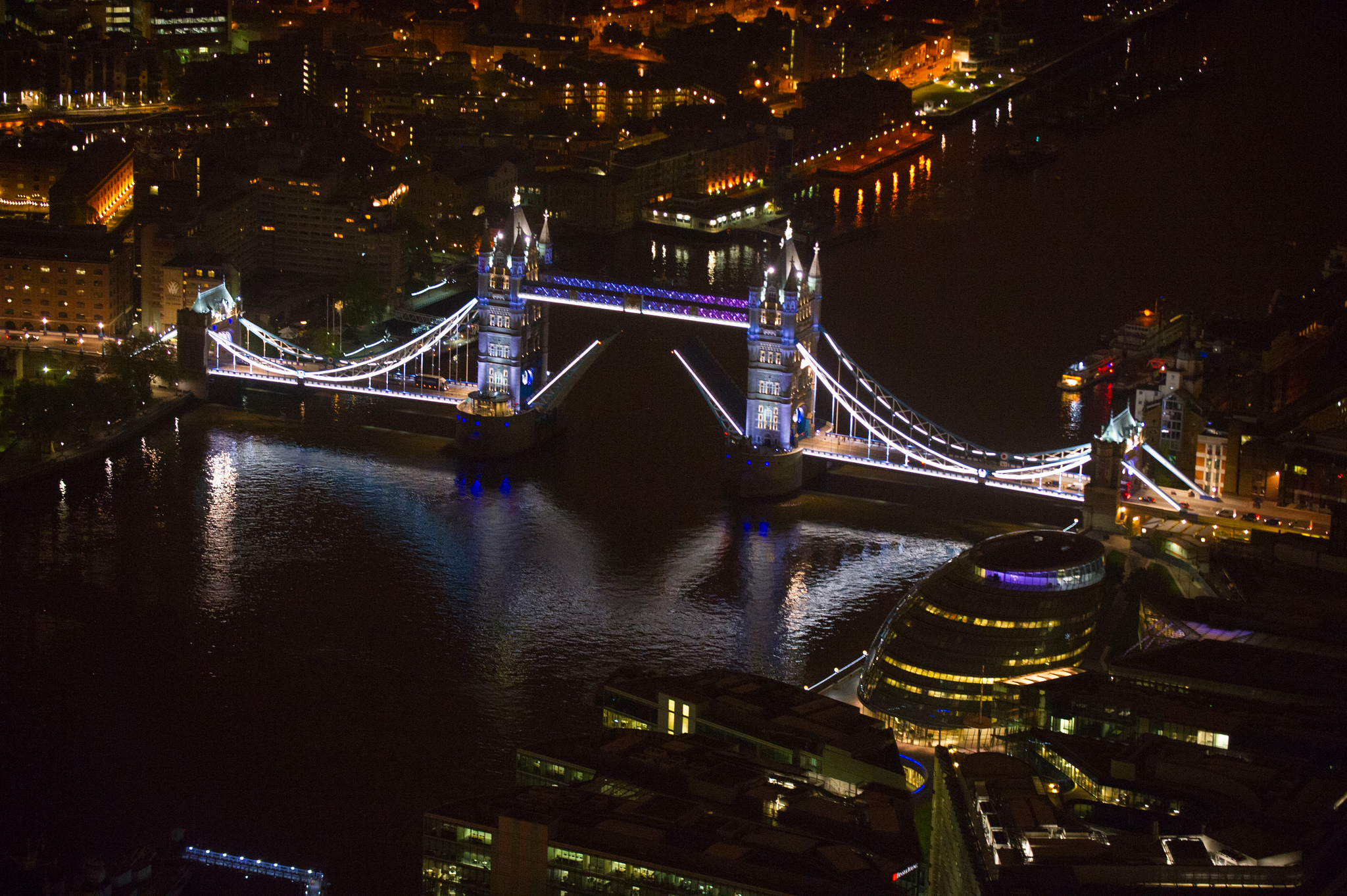
Aerial view with bridge open

The main towers "consist of a skeleton of steelwork, covered with a facing of granite and Portland stone, backed with brickwork on the inside faces." An octagonal steel column stands at each corner of each tower (119 feet 6 inches long). The smaller abutment towers were "generally similar...though on a smaller scale." "The total length of the bridge, including the abutments, is 940 feet (290 m), and the length of the approaches are 1,260 feet on the north side, and 780 feet on the south side. The width of the bridge and approaches between the parapets is 60 feet, except across the opening span where it is 49 feet. The steepest gradients are 1 in 60 on the north side, and 1 in 40 on the south side."

The central span of 200 feet (61 m) between the towers is split into two equal bascules, or leaves, which project 100 feet out each and extend backwards 62 feet 6 inches within the face of each pier. The bascules, weighing about 1,070 tons each including ballast and paving, are counterbalanced to minimise the force required and allow raising in five minutes and have an arc of rotation of 82° with the centre of the arc, or pivot point, being 13 feet 3 inches inside the face of each pier and 5 feet 7 inches beneath the surface of the roadway.

The two side spans are suspension bridges, each 270 feet (82 m) long, with the suspension rods anchored both at the abutments and through rods contained within the bridge's upper walkways. The pedestrian walkways are 143 feet (44 m) above the river at high tide and accessed by lifts and staircases. These walkways were designed as cantilever bridges for a distance from each tower of 55 feet, with girders bridging the 120 feet between the ends of the cantilevers.

The structure was designed to withstand wind pressures of 56 lb per square foot (2.7 kPa), a design constraint introduced following the Tay Bridge disaster which had occurred just 15 years before the opening of Tower Bridge.

There is a chimney on the bridge that is painted to look like a lamppost. It was connected to a fireplace in a guardroom located in one of the bridge piers.

=== Hydraulic system ===
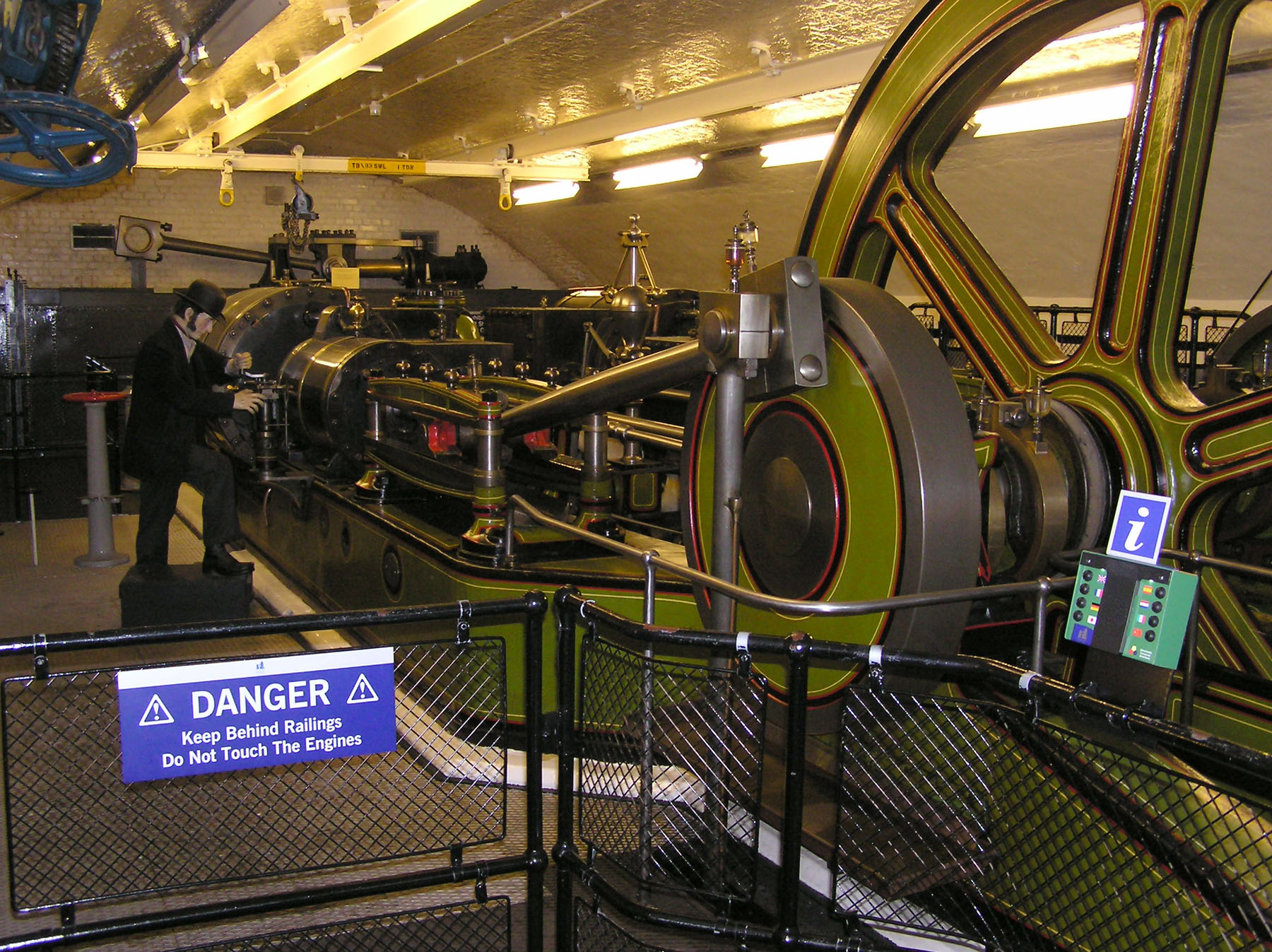
One of the original steam engines

The original raising mechanism was powered by pressurised water stored in six hydraulic accumulators. There were then two pairs of engines on each pier. Each pair consisted of a larger engine 8 ½ inches in diameter and a smaller one at 7 ½ inches. All eight engines had three cylinders. The reason for two pairs of engines on each pier was to build in redundancy. The machinery was "equal to twice the requirements of the Board of Trade", already very rigorous standards established following the Tay Bridge Disaster.

The system was designed and installed by Hamilton Owen Rendel while working for Armstrong, Mitchell and Company of Newcastle upon Tyne. and later run by the London Hydraulic Power Company. Water at a pressure of 750 psi (5.2 MPa) was pumped into the accumulators by a pair of stationary steam engines. Each drove a force pump from its piston tail rod. The accumulators each comprise a 20-inch (51 cm) ram which sits a very heavy weight to maintain the desired pressure.

The entire hydraulic system along with the gas lighting system was installed by William Sugg & Co Ltd. The gas lighting was initially by open-flame burners within the lanterns, but was soon updated to the later incandescent system.

In 1974, the original operating mechanism was largely replaced by a new electro-hydraulic drive system, designed by BHA Cromwell House. The only remaining parts of the old system are the final pinions, which fit into the racks on the bascules and were driven by hydraulic motors and gearing. Oil is now used in place of water as the new hydraulic fluid.

=== Signalling and control ===
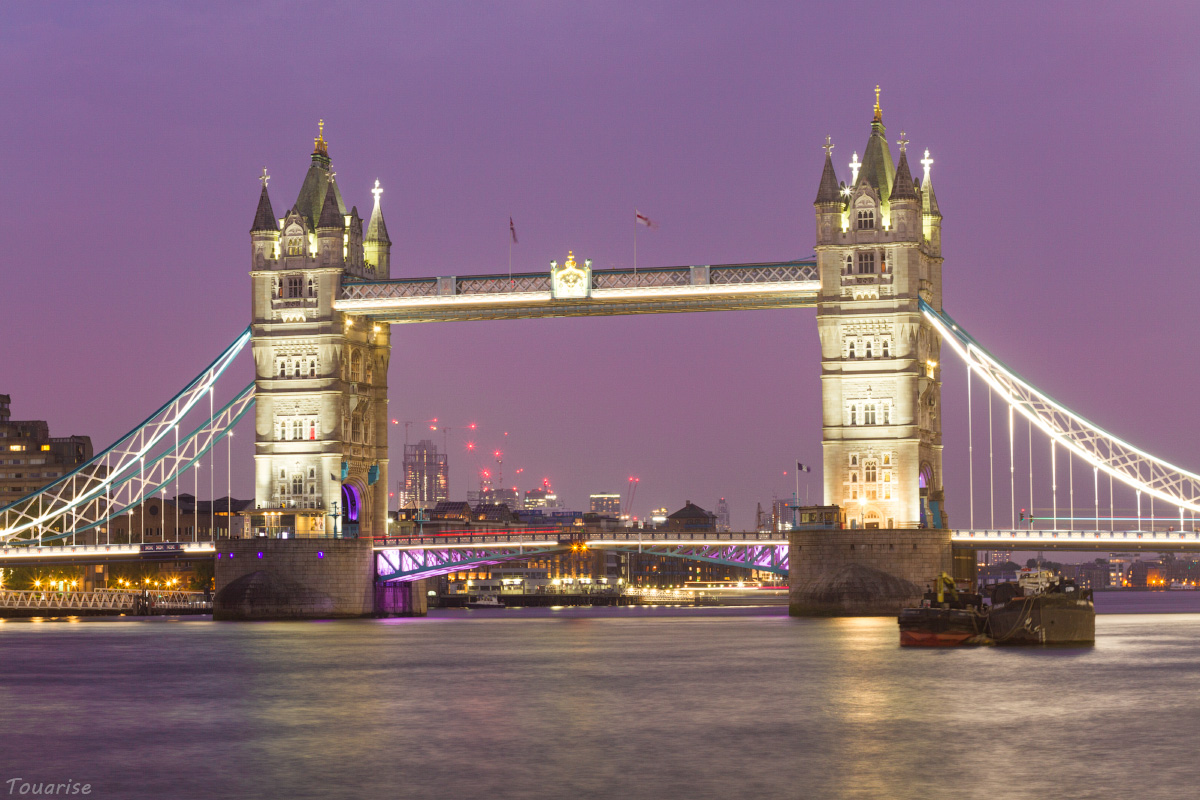
Tower Bridge in 2018

Originally, river traffic passing beneath the bridge was required to follow several rules and signals. Daytime control was provided by red semaphore signals, mounted on small control cabins on either end of both of the bridge piers. At night, coloured lights were used, in either direction, on both of the piers: two red lights to show that the bridge was closed, and two green to show that it was open. In foggy weather, a gong was sounded as well.

Vessels passing through the bridge were required to display signals. By day, a black ball at least 2 feet (0.61 m) in diameter was mounted high up where it could be seen. Night passage called for two red lights in the same position. Foggy weather required repeated blasts from the ship's steam whistle. If a black ball was suspended from the middle of each walkway (or a red light at night) this indicated that the bridge could not be opened. These signals were repeated about 1,000 yards (910 m) downstream, at Cherry Garden Pier, where boats needing to pass through the bridge had to hoist their signals/lights and sound their horn, as appropriate, to alert the bridge master.

Some of the control mechanism for the signalling equipment has been preserved and is housed in the Tower Bridge's museum.

== Traffic ==
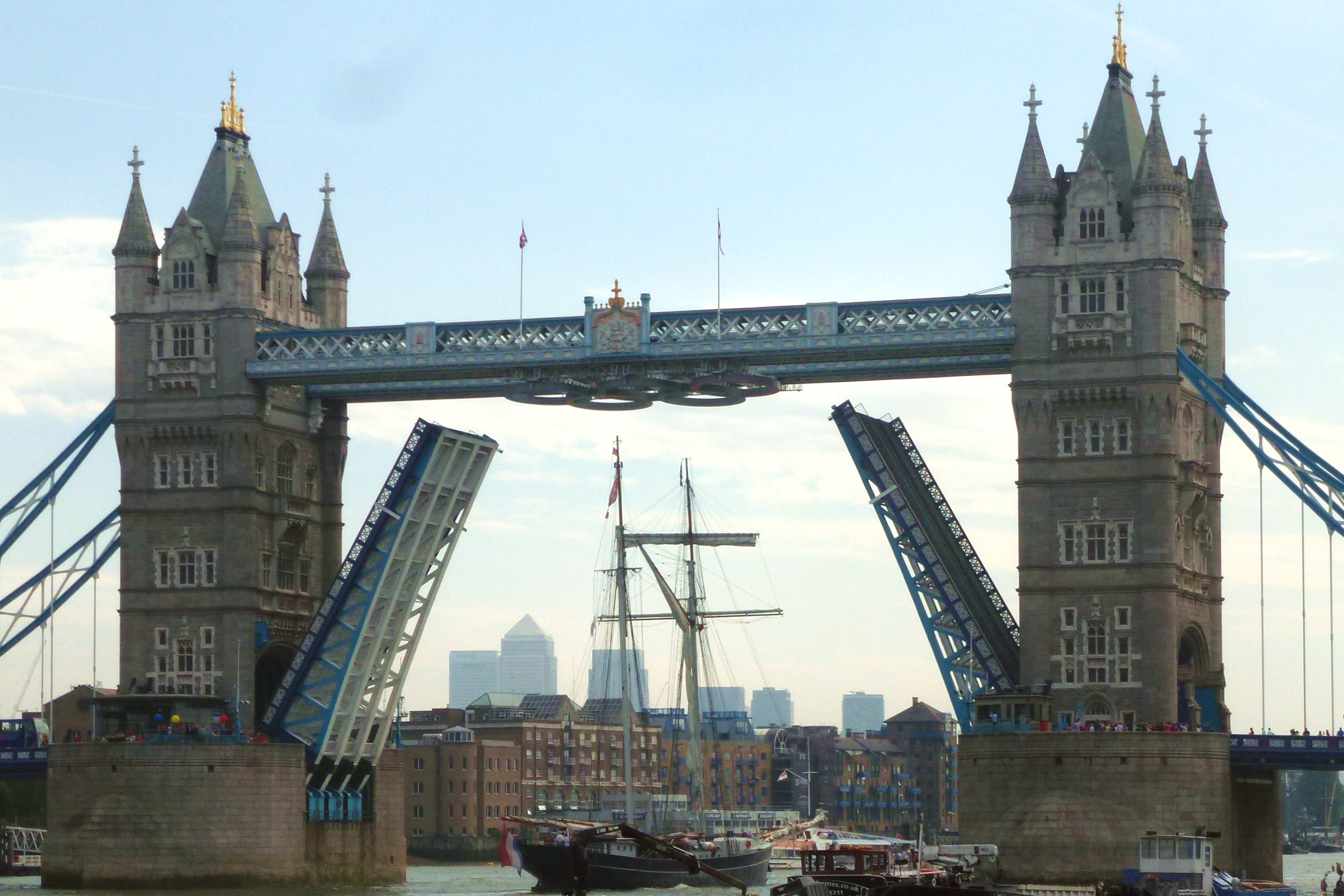
The tall ship Wylde Swan passing under Tower Bridge decorated for the London Olympics in August 2012. Note the Olympic rings are folded up to allow passage of the mast.

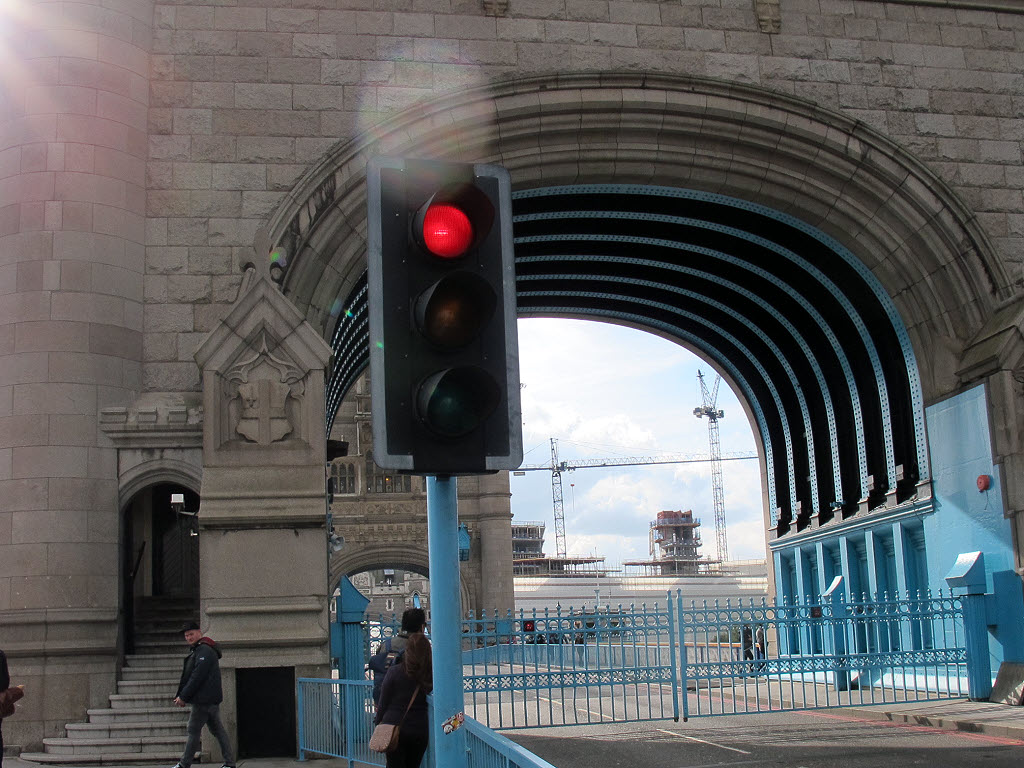
Preparing Tower Bridge for raising. When this occurs, gates across the low-level part are closed and motorists are ordered to stop by a red light on ordinary traffic signals, not by a pair of flashing red lights.

=== Road ===
During the first twelve months after the opening of the bridge, the average stoppage of road traffic at each bridge lift was six minutes. The average number of vehicles crossing the bridge daily was about 8,000.

Tower Bridge is still a busy crossing of the Thames, used by more than 40,000 people (motorists, cyclists, and pedestrians) every day. The bridge is on the London Inner Ring Road, and is on the eastern boundary of the London congestion charge zone (drivers do not incur the charge by crossing the bridge).

To maintain the integrity of the structure, the City of London Corporation has imposed a 20-mile-per-hour (32 km/h) speed restriction, and an 18-tonne (20-short-ton) weight limit on vehicles using the bridge. A camera system measures the speed of traffic crossing the bridge, using a number plate recognition system to send fixed penalty charges to speeding drivers.

A second system monitors other vehicle parameters. Induction loops and piezoelectric sensors are used to measure the weight, the height of the chassis above ground level, and the number of axles of each vehicle, with drivers of overweight vehicles also receiving fixed penalty notices.

=== Pedestrian ===
Pedestrians can walk across on the bascule bridge when it is down for auto and truck traffic. Ship traffic has priority, meaning traffic using the bascule bridge waits when the bridge opens for ships.

From the outset in 1894, the high-level connection was a pedestrian route and was intended to allow pedestrian movement to continue while the bascule bridge was open for ship traffic. During the first twelve months after opening, the average number of pedestrians using the bridge was about 60,000 daily. The pedestrian walkways in each direction were changed to have glass floors in 2014. Lifts bring pedestrians up to and down from the high level pedestrian bridge. The upper walkways are part of the Tower Bridge Exhibition, which included a tour of how the bascule bridge works. Pedestrians can view the city from the bridge and through its upper walkway. There is a fee for the Tower Bridge Exhibition, tickets are needed.

=== River ===
During the first twelve months after the opening of the bridge, the bascules were raised for the passage of vessels 6,160 times, an average of seventeen times daily. Now, the bascules are raised about a thousand times a year. River traffic is now much reduced, but it still takes priority over road traffic. Today, 24 hours' notice is required before opening the bridge, and opening times are published in advance on the bridge's website; there is no charge for vessels to open the bridge.

=== Cycling ===
Transport for London have proposed Cycle Superhighway 4 to run across Tower Bridge.

== Touring the bridge ==
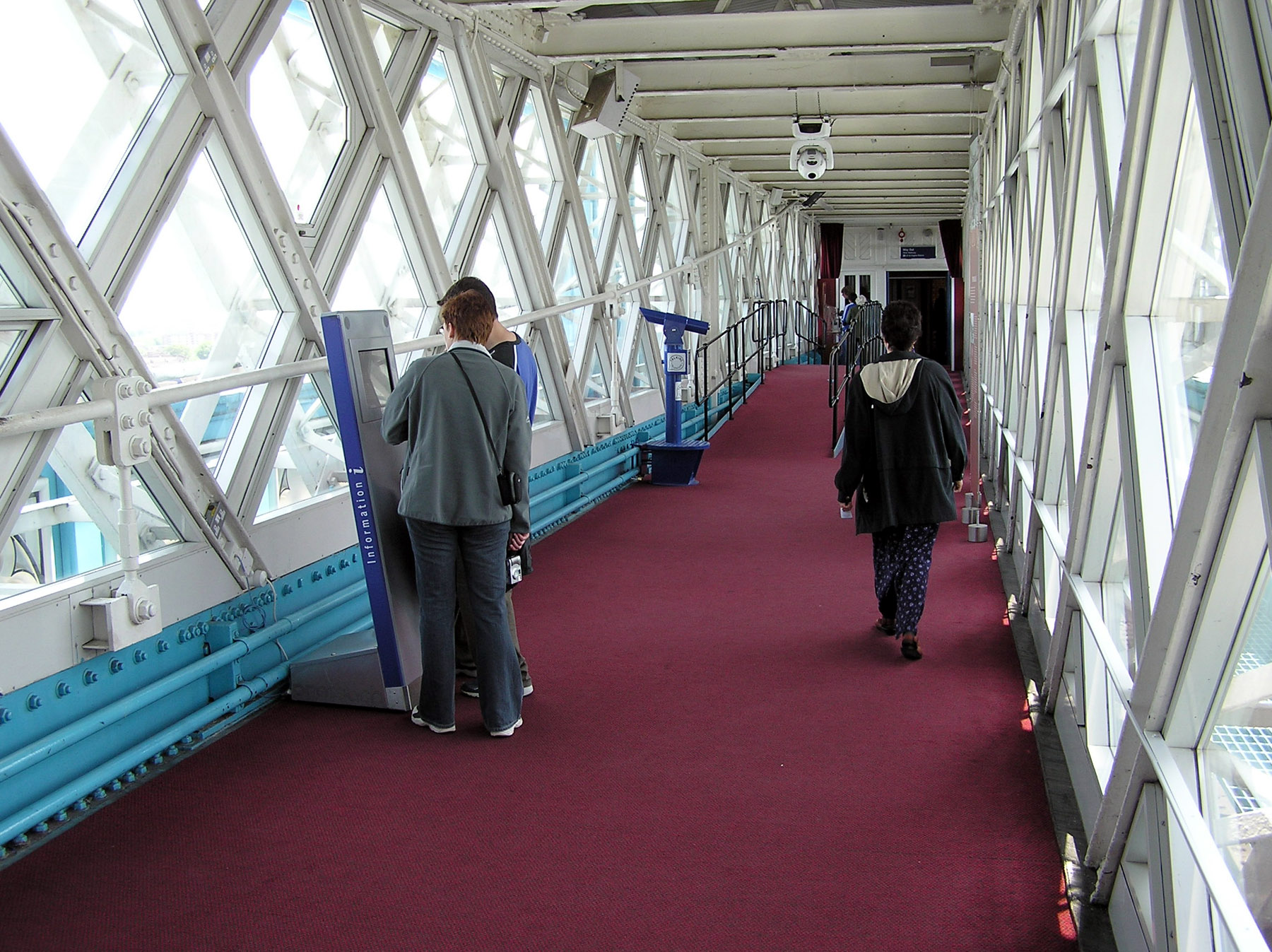
Interior of high-level walkway in 2005 (used as an exhibition space) prior to glass floors

The Tower Bridge attraction is a display housed inside the bridge's towers, the high-level walkways, and the Victorian engine rooms. It uses films, photos, and interactive displays to explain why and how Tower Bridge was built. Visitors can access the original steam engines that once powered the bridge bascules, housed in Engine Rooms, underneath the south end of the bridge.

The attraction charges an admission fee. The entrance is from the ticket office on the west side of the North Tower, from where visitors can climb the stairs (or take a lift) to the high-level Walkways to cross to the South Tower. In the Towers and Walkways is interpretation about the history of the bridge. The Walkways also provide views over the city, the Tower of London and the Pool of London, and include two Glass Floors, where you can look down to see the road and River Thames below. From the South Tower, visitors can visit exit and follow the Blue Line to the Victorian Engine Rooms, with the original steam engines, which are situated in a separate building underneath the southern approach to the bridge.

Of the 1,114 English visitor attractions tracked by Visit England, in 2019 Tower Bridge had 889,338 visitors and was the 34th most visited attraction in England, and the 17th most visited attraction that charged an admission fee. It is one of only three bridges in England tracked as a visitor attraction alongside the Clifton Suspension Bridge in Bristol and The Iron Bridge in Shropshire.

== Reaction ==
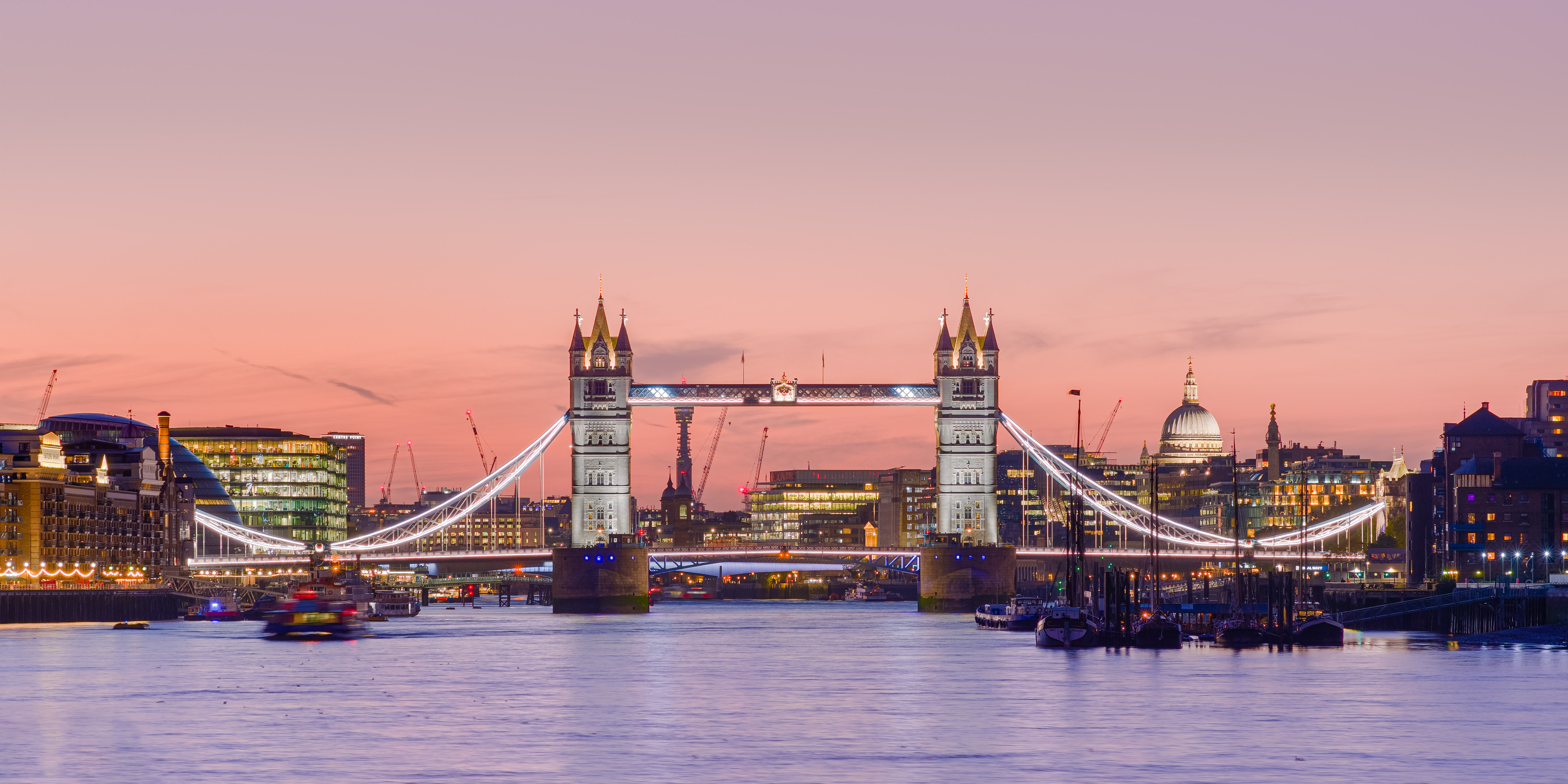
Side view of Tower Bridge, from King's Stairs Gardens

Although Tower Bridge is an undoubted landmark, with the City of London calling it "London's defining landmark", some professional commentators in the early 20th century were critical of its aesthetics. "It represents the vice of tawdriness and pretentiousness, and of falsification of the actual facts of the structure", wrote Henry Heathcote Statham, while Frank Brangwyn stated that "A more absurd structure than the Tower Bridge was never thrown across a strategic river".

Benjamin Crisler, the New York Times film critic, wrote in 1938: "Three unique and valuable institutions the British have that we in America have not: Magna Carta, the Tower Bridge and Alfred Hitchcock." Architectural historian Dan Cruickshank selected Tower Bridge as one of his four choices for the 2002 BBC television documentary series Britain's Best Buildings. The bridge and its surrounding landscape was depicted in an official BBC trailer for the 2021 Rugby League World Cup (in reference to London being one of the host cities).

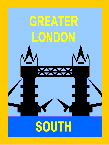
Tower Bridge shown on the badge of Greater London South Scouts

Tower Bridge has been mistaken for the next bridge upstream, London Bridge. A popular urban legend is that in 1968, Robert P. McCulloch, the purchaser of the old London Bridge that was later shipped to Lake Havasu City in Arizona, believed that he was buying Tower Bridge. This was denied by McCulloch himself and has been debunked by Ivan Luckin, the vendor of the bridge.

A partial replica of Tower Bridge has been built in the city of Suzhou in China. The replica differs from the original in having no lifting mechanism and four separate towers. The Suzhou replica was renovated in 2019, giving it a new look that differs from the original London design.

Tower Bridge is the emblem of the Greater London Scout Region of The Scout Association and features on the badges of the six London Scout counties.

== Incidents ==
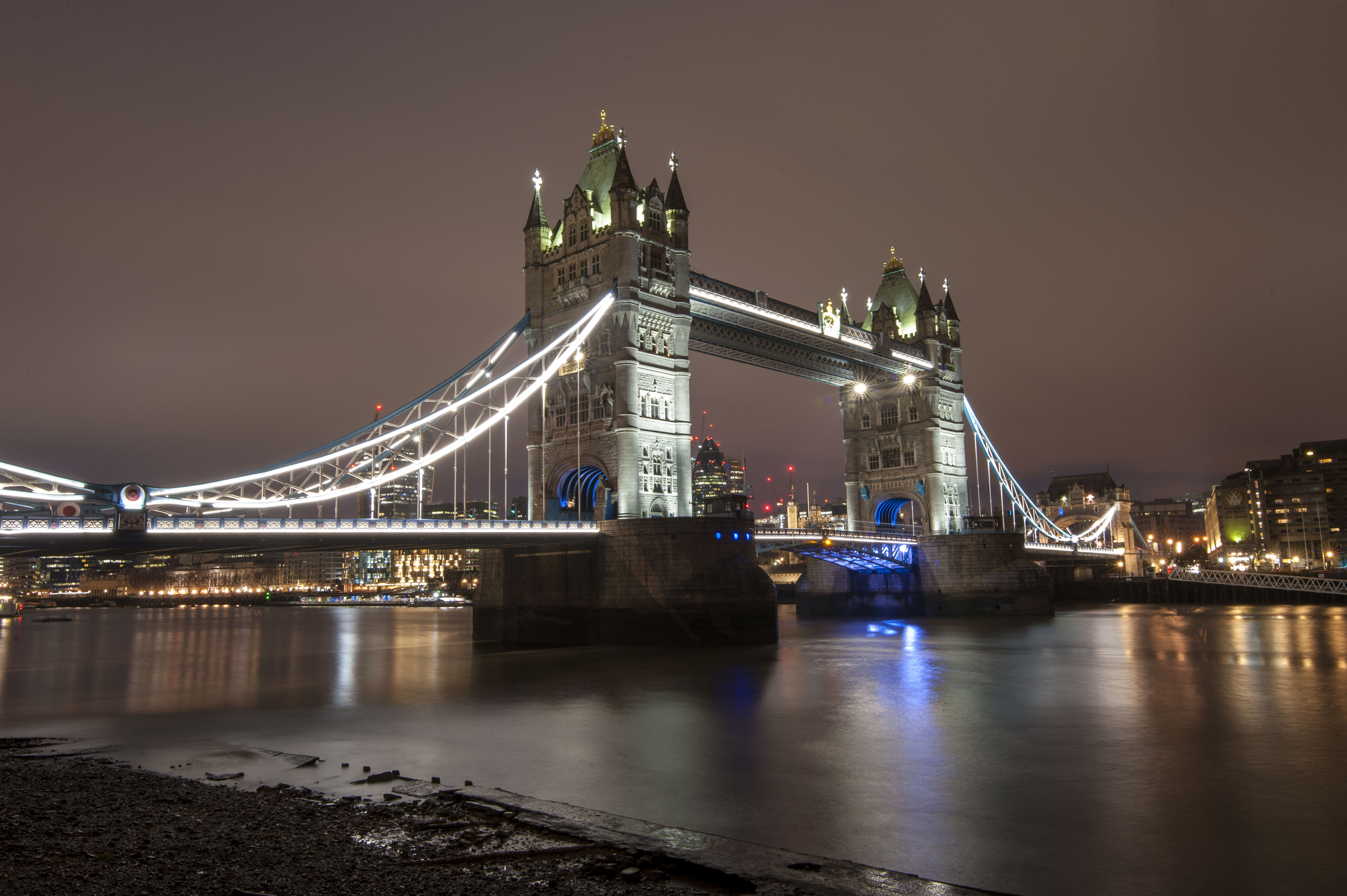
Tower Bridge in 2018

On 10 August 1912, the pioneering stunt pilot Francis McClean flew between the bascules and the high-level walkways in his Short Brothers S.33 floatplane. McClean became a celebrity overnight because of the stunt, and went on to fly underneath London Bridge, Blackfriars Bridge and Waterloo Bridge.

On 3 August 1922, a 13-year-old boy fell off a slipway next to the south side of Tower Bridge. A man jumped into the Thames to save him, but both were pulled under a barge by Butler's Wharf and drowned.

In December 1952, the bridge opened while a number 78 double-decker bus, driven by Albert Gunter, was crossing from the south bank. The bus was near the end of the south bascule when it started to rise; Gunter made a split-second decision to accelerate, clearing a 3-foot (1 m) gap to drop 6 feet (2 m) onto the north bascule. There were no serious injuries and Gunter was given £10, by the City Corporation, to honour his act of bravery.

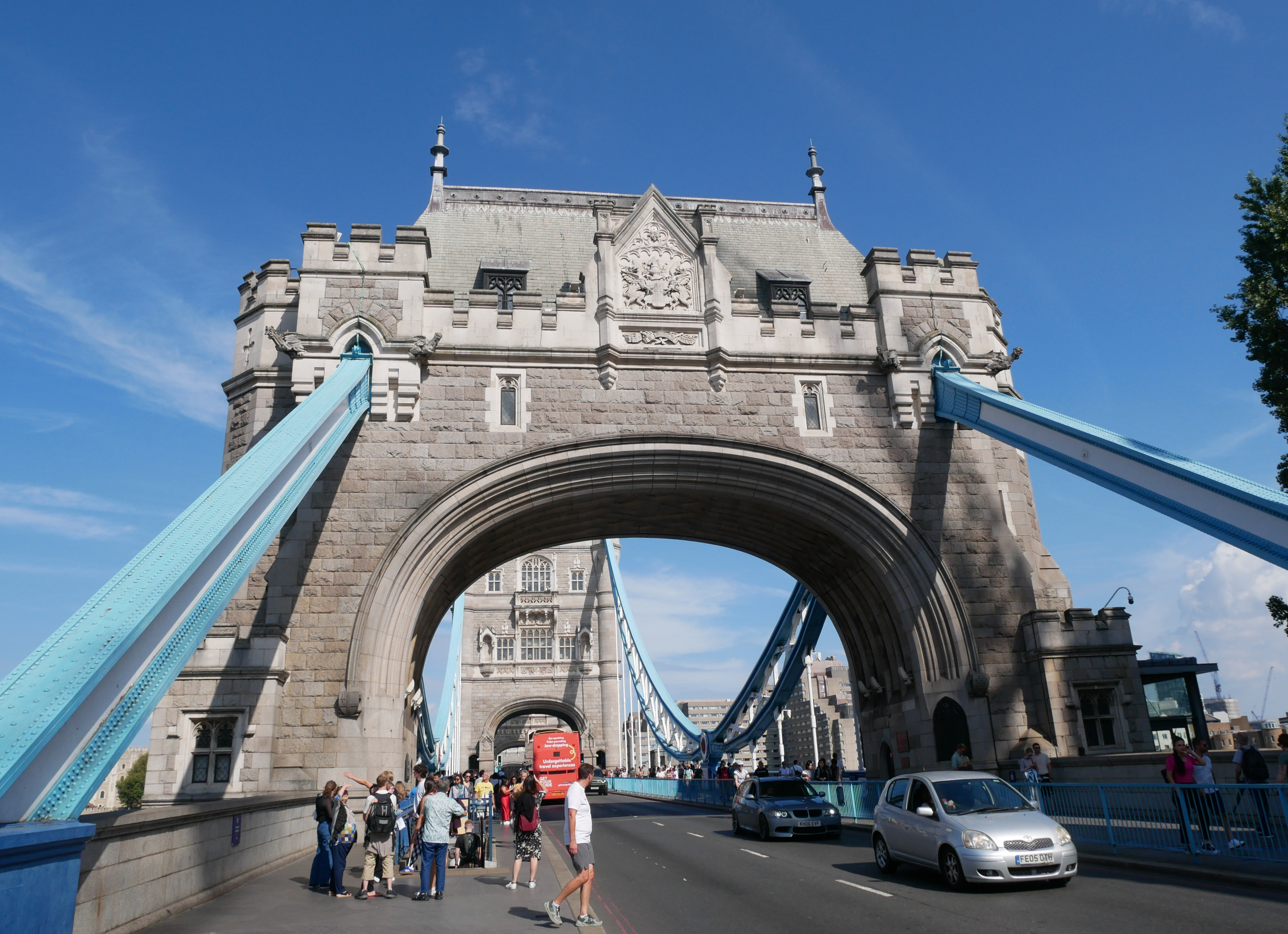
The south arch of Tower Bridge

On 5 April 1968, a Royal Air Force Hawker Hunter FGA.9 jet fighter from No. 1 Squadron made an unauthorised flight through Tower Bridge. Unimpressed that senior staff was not going to celebrate the RAF's 50th birthday with a flypast, the pilot flew at low altitude down the Thames without authorisation, past the Houses of Parliament, and continued towards the bridge. He flew beneath the walkway, at an estimated 300 miles per hour (500 km/h). He was placed under arrest upon landing, and discharged from the RAF on medical grounds without the chance to defend himself at a court martial.

On 31 July 1973, a single-engined Beagle Pup was twice flown under the pedestrian walkway of Tower Bridge by 29-year-old stockbroker's clerk Peter Martin. Martin, who was on bail following accusations of stock market fraud, then "buzzed" buildings in the city before flying north towards the Lake District, where he died when his aircraft crashed some two hours later.

In May 1997, the motorcade of United States President Bill Clinton was divided by the opening of the bridge. The Thames sailing barge Gladys, on her way to a gathering at St Katharine Docks, arrived on schedule and the bridge was opened for her. Returning from a Thames-side lunch at Le Pont de la Tour restaurant with UK Prime Minister Tony Blair, President Clinton was less punctual and arrived just as the bridge was rising. The bridge opening split the motorcade in two, much to the consternation of security staff. A spokesman for Tower Bridge is quoted as saying: "We tried to contact the American Embassy, but they wouldn't answer the phone."

On 19 August 1999, Jef Smith, a Freeman of the City of London, drove a flock of two sheep across the bridge. He was exercising a claimed ancient permission, granted as a right to freemen, to make a point about the powers of older citizens and the way their rights were being eroded.

Before dawn on 31 October 2003, a Fathers 4 Justice campaigner climbed a 100-foot (30 m) tower crane near Tower Bridge at the start of a six-day protest dressed as Spider-Man. Fearing for his safety, and that of motorists should he fall, police cordoned off the area, closing the bridge and surrounding roads and causing widespread traffic congestion across the City and East London.

On 11 May 2009, six people were trapped and injured after a lift fell 10 feet (3 m) inside the north tower.

On 9 August 2021, the bridge remained open after a technical failure. The bridge had opened to let the Jubilee Trust Tall Ship through from 2 p.m. before getting stuck. The bridge was closed and reopened to traffic approximately 12 hours later.

== See also ==
- List of bridges in London
- Crossings of the River Thames
- Moveable bridges
- Pool of London

=== Historic places adjacent to Tower Bridge ===
- HMS Belfast
- London Bridge
- Shad Thames
- St Katharine Docks
- Tower of London
A comparison of the side elevation of the Tower Bridge to the side elevations of some of the most notable bridges around the world on the same scale (see also interactive version)
