= London Buses route 78 =

London bus route

78
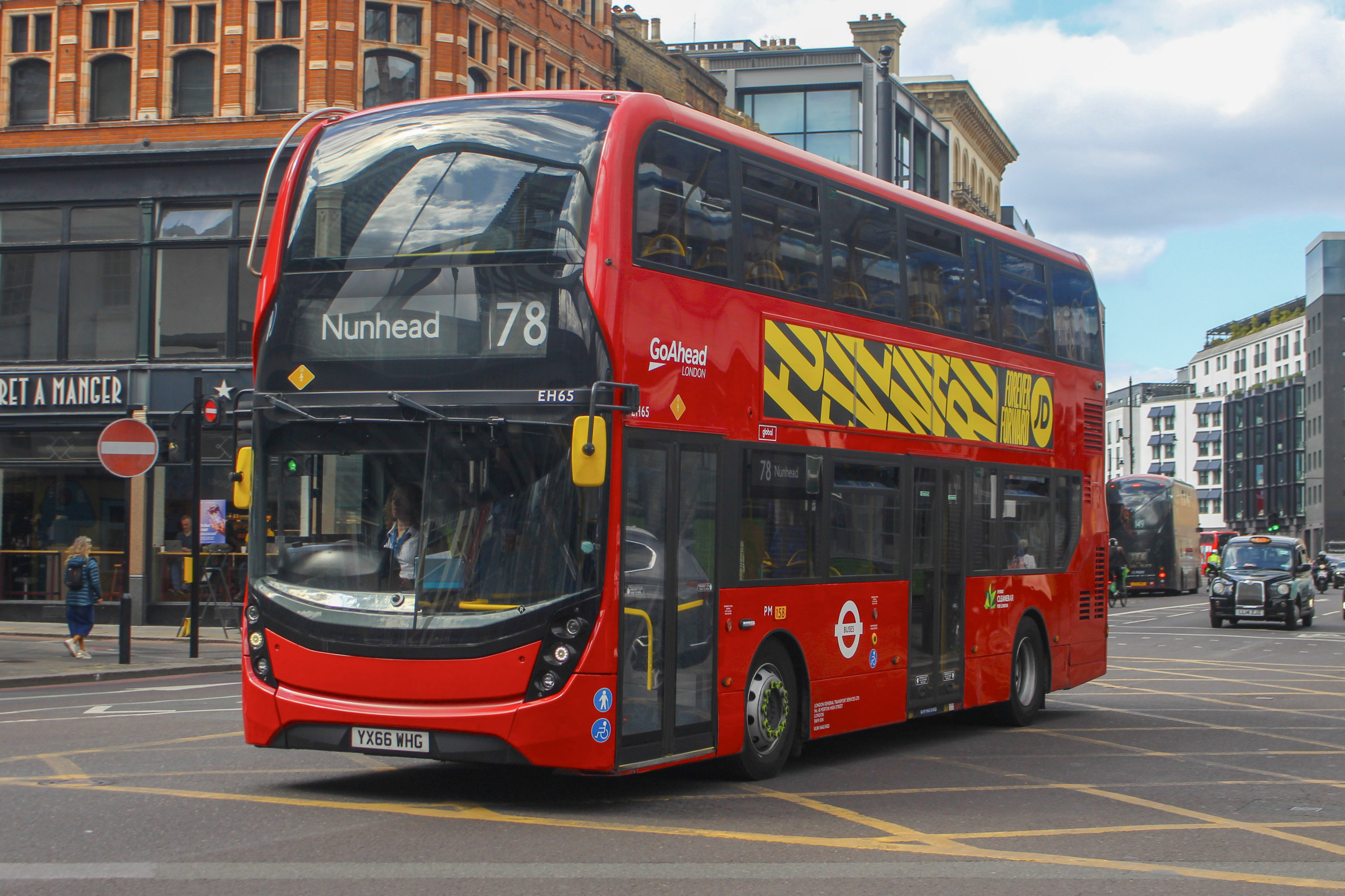
- London Central Alexander Dennis Enviro400H MMC at Shoreditch High Street station in May 2025

Overview
- Operator: London Central (Go-Ahead London)
- Garage: Peckham
- Vehicle: Alexander Dennis Enviro400H MMC

Route
- Start: Nunhead
- Via: Peckham; Bermondsey; Aldgate
- End: Shoreditch

Service
- Level: Daily
- Frequency: About every 9-12 minutes

London Buses route 78 is a Transport for London contracted bus route in London, England. Running between Nunhead and Shoreditch, it is operated by Go-Ahead London subsidiary London Central.

== History ==
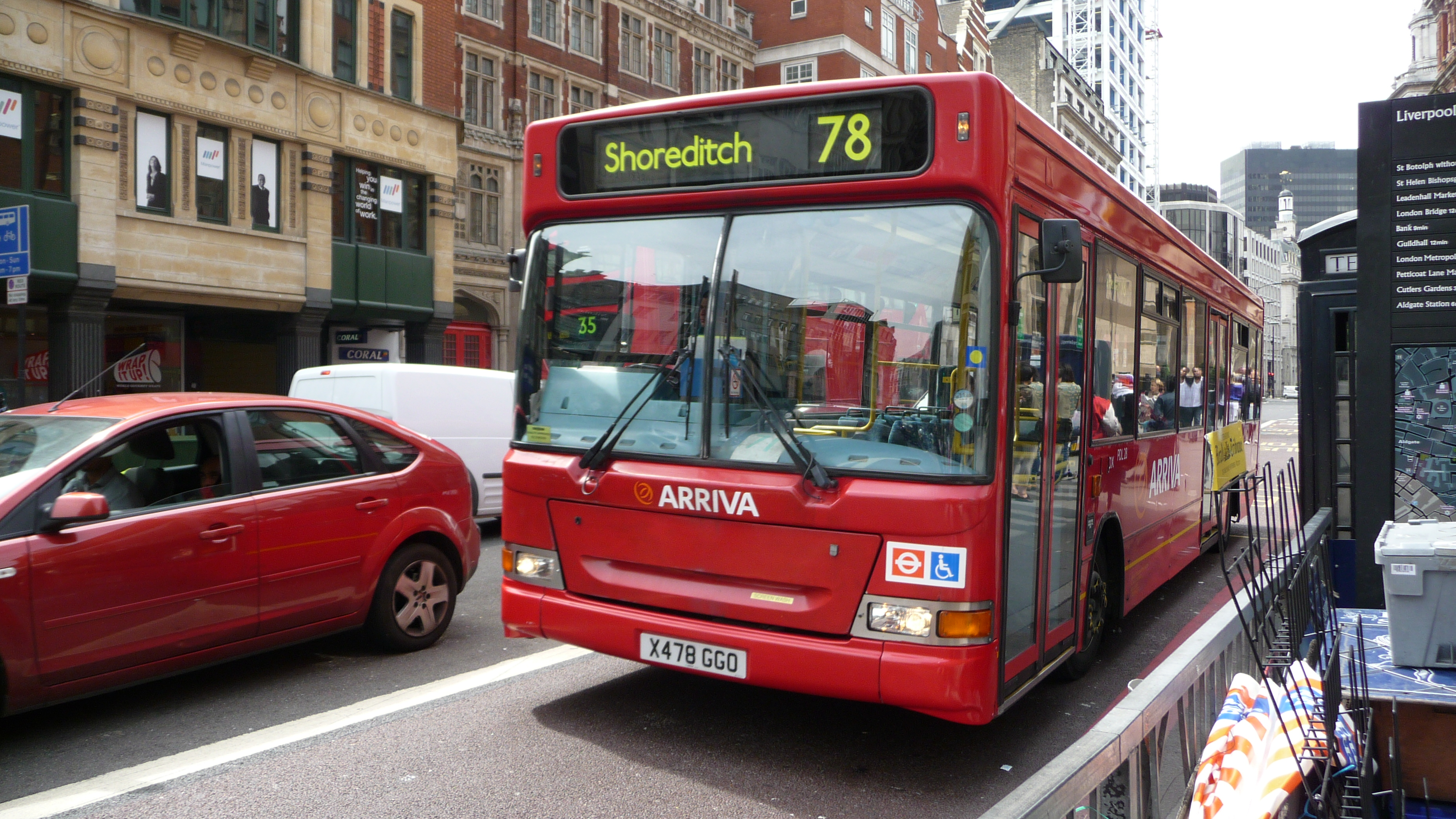
Arriva London Plaxton Pointer 2 bodied Dennis Dart SLF in Bishopsgate in June 2009

On 30 December 1952, a number 78 double-decker bus was crossing Tower Bridge. At that time, the gateman would ring a warning bell and close the gates when the bridge was clear before the watchman ordered the raising of the bridge. The process failed while a relief watchman was on duty. The bus was near the edge of the south bascule when it started to rise; driver Albert Edward Gunter (1906-1968) made a split-second decision to accelerate the bus, clearing a 1.8 m (6 ft) drop onto the north bascule, which had not started to rise. The conductor broke his leg, and twelve of the twenty passengers aboard received minor injuries. The driver was later rewarded with a £10 bonus (about £246.81 today) for his bravery.

On 20 May 2000 the route was extended from Peckham Rye to Nunhead. The route was retained by Arriva London following re-tendering in 2003, November 2010 and November 2015.

New Alexander Dennis Enviro400 double deckers were introduced on 17 April 2011, replacing the existing single deckers.

Following the November 2015 tender, new Alexander Dennis Enviro400H City vehicles were ordered with the expectation that they would enter service in November 2015. The first buses of this type to operate in London, the Alexander Dennis Enviro400H City is visually styled on the New Routemaster and Alexander Dennis Enviro200 MMC, suggested to be a cost-effective alternative to the New Routemaster for use in the London suburbs. The first of these entered service on 7 December 2015.

The route passed to London Central from their Peckham garage using existing Alexander Dennis Enviro400H MMCs on 2 December 2023.

== Current route ==
Route 78 operates via these primary locations:

- Nunhead
- Peckham Rye station
- Old Kent Road
- Bermondsey
- Tower Bridge
- Tower Gateway station
- Aldgate station
- Liverpool Street station
- Shoreditch High Street station
- Shoreditch
