= 1952 Tower Bridge bus jump incident =

1952 road incident in the United Kingdom

Gunter in 1953

On 30 December 1952, the British bus driver Albert Edward Gunter (28 February 1906 – 2 February 1968) jumped the Tower Bridge in London in his double-decker bus.

== Background ==
Albert Edward Gunter was born in St Luke's, Middlesex, the son of Robert Henry Gunter and Priscilla Elizabeth. He served in the British Army as a tank driver during World War II.

== Incident ==
On 30 December 1952, Gunter was driving his double-decker bus, an AEC Regent III RT, on his normal number 78 bus route.

As Gunter approached Tower Bridge at a speed of 12 miles per hour (19 km/h), the traffic light at the beginning of the bridge was green and the warning hand bell was not ringing, falsely indicating that it was safe to cross. As a result, Gunter continued onto the bridge, approaching the end of the south bascule as it started to rise.

At this point, Gunter made a split-second decision to accelerate the 7.5-tonne (7,500 kg) double-decker bus, instead of slowing down and potentially tumbling backwards. The bus cleared a 3-foot (1 m) gap to drop 6 feet (2 m) onto the north bascule, which had not yet started to rise. Speaking to Time, for its "foreign news" section, on 12 January 1953, Gunter said: "Everything happened terribly quickly ... I realised that the part we were on was rising. It was horrifying. I felt we had to keep on or we might be flung into the river."

Following the hard landing on the north bascule, although there were no fatalities as a result of the jump, there was one major injury, with the conductor breaking his leg, and twelve minor injuries. One of the bus suspension springs was also broken.

== Aftermath ==
Gunter was later given a reward of £10 (worth £261.42 as of October 2026) and a day off work for his bravery. When asked what he would do with the bonus, he said, "five for me and five for the missus".

Gunter was later quoted saying, "I'd always wanted to jump the bus over the gap! And I got a day off and a tenner for it, to boot!"

Gunter died on 2 February 1968 in Islington, at the age of 61.
