= Charles Yale Beach =

Real estate investor from Connecticut

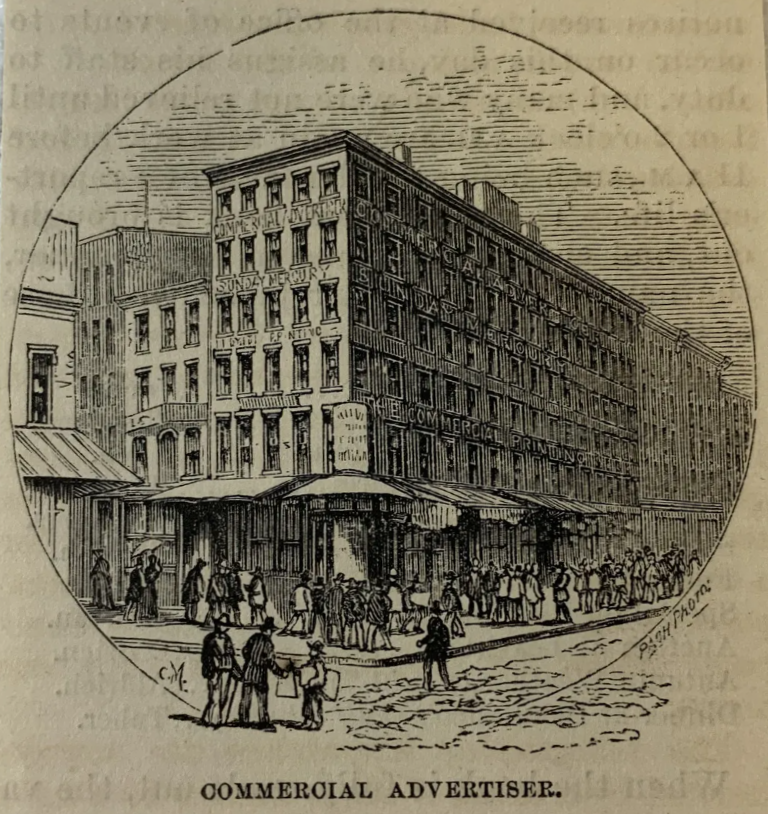
The landmarked Commercial Advertiser Building on Fulton Street, Manhattan, property of Charles Yale Beach, from Moses Yale Beach's estate

Charles Yale Beach (March 4, 1847 – October 16, 1917) was an American real estate investor, inventor and businessman from New York. He was among the largest real estate owners of Bridgeport, Connecticut, behind Senator Nathaniel Wheeler and Clinton Barnum Seeley, grandson of P. T. Barnum.

He was also a correspondent of Mark Twain, who was with the Beach family among the Quaker City excursion of 1867, covered in Twain's Innocents Abroad. Beach's New York historical landmark, the Commercial Advertiser Building, burned down in 1891.

== Biography ==
Charles Yale Beach was born in New York City on March 4, 1847, to Chloe Buckingham and politician Moses S. Beach, members of the Yale family. He was a brother of Emma Beach Thayer, wife of artist Abbott Handerson Thayer, member of the Boston Brahmin Thayer family. His uncles were Alfred Ely Beach and William Yale Beach.

Charles Yale Beach graduated from Brooklyn Polytechnic Institute. He then studied philosophy at Yale University, at the time of the presidency of Theodore Dwight Woolsey, and was recorded a student between 1860 and 1864 until his graduation.

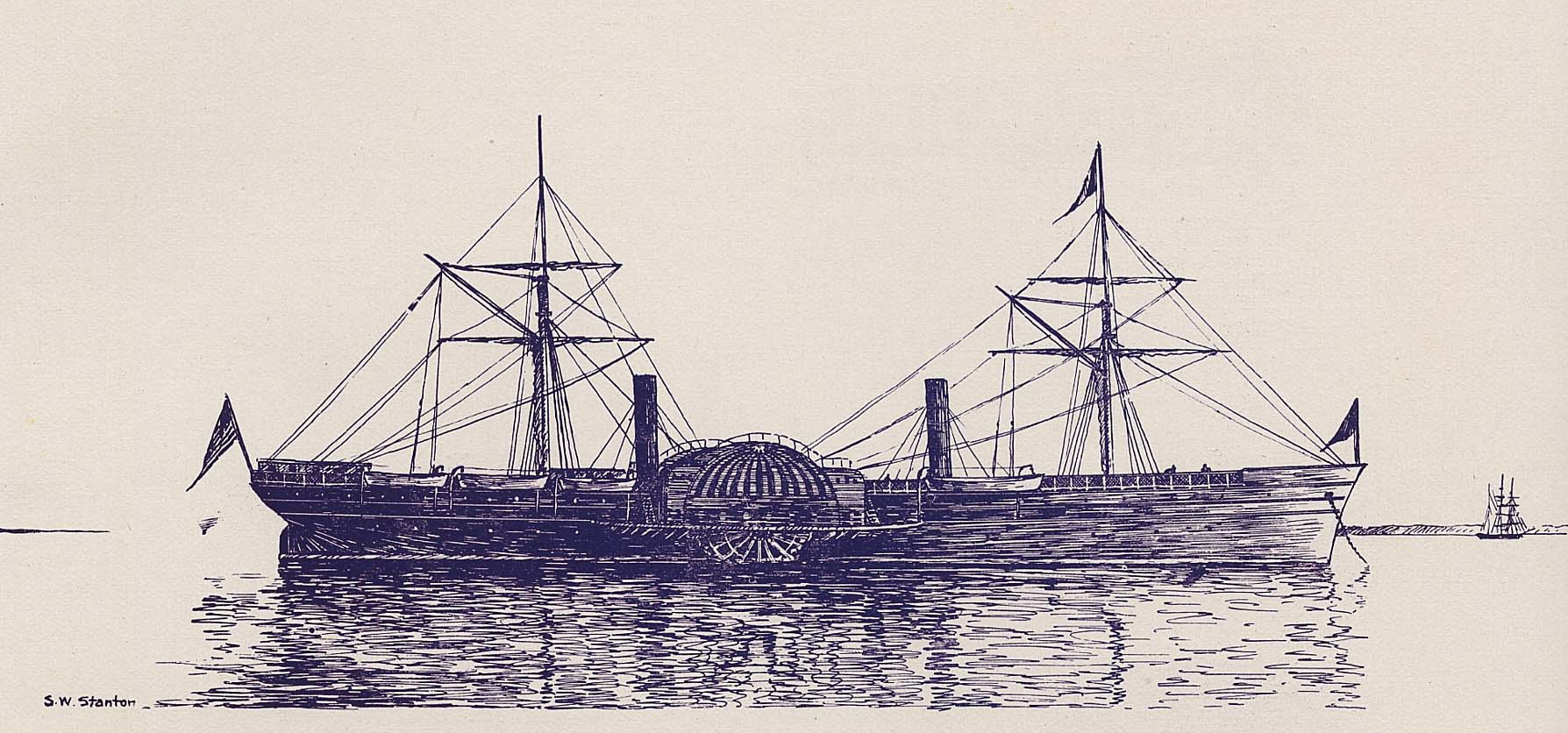
The brig SS Arago (1855) on which Charles Yale Beach embarked for the excursion to Fort Sumter, following the end of the American Civil War

In 1865, he returned from the excursion of raising the flag at Fort Sumter aboard the brig Arago, with Maj. Gen. Robert Anderson, abolitionist Henry Ward Beecher, Lt. Gov. Charles Anderson, abolitionist William Lloyd Garrison, and others. The excursion was made in the memory of Abraham Lincoln and to celebrate the end of the American Civil War. The Fort Sumter Club would be formed during the flag-raising event, by the passengers of another steamship, which included General Edwin R. Yale, its cofounder and first president.

Beach was among the passengers of the Quaker City excursion of 1867 to the Holy Land, with his father Moses S. Beach, and sister Emma Beach Thayer, joining them in Paris, and the family would become friends with passenger Mark Twain, and have him as a guest at their family home in Brooklyn Heights. Other passengers included President Ulysses Grant, General Sherman and the young Theodore Roosevelt.

In 1879, Beach invented a new system to manufacture Indian rubber and other gum compounds for surfacing cloth and other purposes, and recorded his invention at the United States Patent and Trademark Office. He received his patent in 1880. Beach also had patents to his name in 1871, having invented a new way to manufacture Bone-Black, and another patent in 1879 for a new way to manufacture rubber.

In 1880, he was involved with the Broadway Underground Railway Company of his uncle, Alfred Ely Beach, along with his cousin Frederick C. Beach. In 1884, Charles Yale Beach is recorded exchanging letters with Mark Twain, along with his father, Moses S. Beach. From 1891 to 1892, he acquired a large amount of real estate in New Haven and Bridgeport in Connecticut, acquired from the estate his received from his deceased father.

== Later life ==
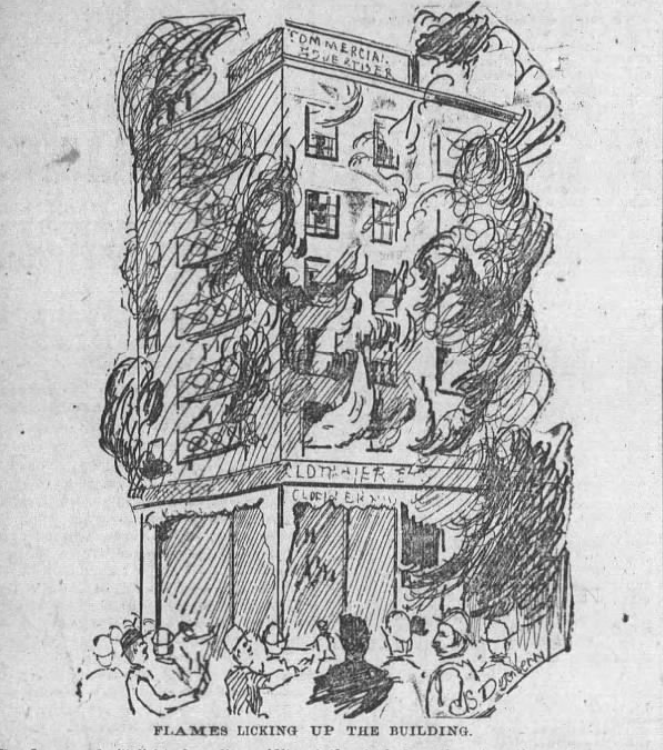
Burning of the Commercial Advertiser Building, New York, in 1891, was owned by Charles Yale Beach, losses at $400,000

In 1891, a property inherited from his father, the Old Commercial Advertiser Building, was burned down, bringing losses of about $400,000. In the same year, Beach is recorded acquiring 37 building lots on Wood Avenue in Bridgeport, Connecticut. The Commercial building was situated on Fulton Street, Manhattan and was one of the landmarks of downtown New York. It was for many years one of the seats of the New York Sun, the penny press newspaper owned by his grandfather, Moses Yale Beach.

In 1896, Beach attended the Church Club of Connecticut, along with Colonel Louis N. Van Keuren, and under the presidency of Colonel Jacob Lyman Green, president of the Connecticut Mutual Insurance Company. In 1903, Beach moved to Pittsfield, Massachusetts, and became treasurer of the Morewod Lake Ice Company.

His wife, Frances W. Stenvenson, died in the city in 1904. Beach would remain active with the company until 1909. A year later, the enterprise would be involved in what would be known as the Morewood Lake Ice Company explosion, and Beach would be a witness during the investigation. He acquired about 100 acres of land on South Mountain, in Pittsfield, Massachusetts, with partner Dewitt Bruce, to connect their existing properties.

In 1916, Beach is recorded among the largest real estate owners and tax payers of Bridgeport, Connecticut, a few positions behind Senator Nathaniel Wheeler and Clinton Barnum Seeley, grandson of P. T. Barnum, who owned multiple estates. Beach was a board director of the YMCA, a member of the Park Club, seated at the Berkshire County Savings Bank Building, and was a member of the country clubs. Park Club members included mayor Hezekiah S. Russell, mayor Allen H. Bagg, mayor Kelton B. Miller, Senator William A. Burns, and others.

== Death ==
Charles Yale Beach died in Atlantic City on October 16, 1917, and was buried at Mountain Grove Cemetery in Bridgeport, Connecticut. He was married to Frances Wardale Stevenson, daughter of wealthy merchant John M. Stevenson, and was for many years vestryman of St. John's Episcopal Church. His wife was a niece of merchant John McAllister Jr., of the wealthy McAllisters of Philadelphia. Her brother and her nephew, John McAllister Stevenson, went to Yale University, and another brother, Holland Newton Stevenson, became a Commodore in the U.S. navy.
