= Tube railway =

The term tube railway may refer to:

- an atmospheric railway, a railway that uses differential air pressure to provide power for propulsion of a vehicle
- an underground railway constructed in a circular tunnel by the use of a tunnelling shield
- by extension of the previous definition, the London Underground, most (but not all) of whose lines are so constructed
