= William Yale Beach =

Banker and real estate developer from Connecticut

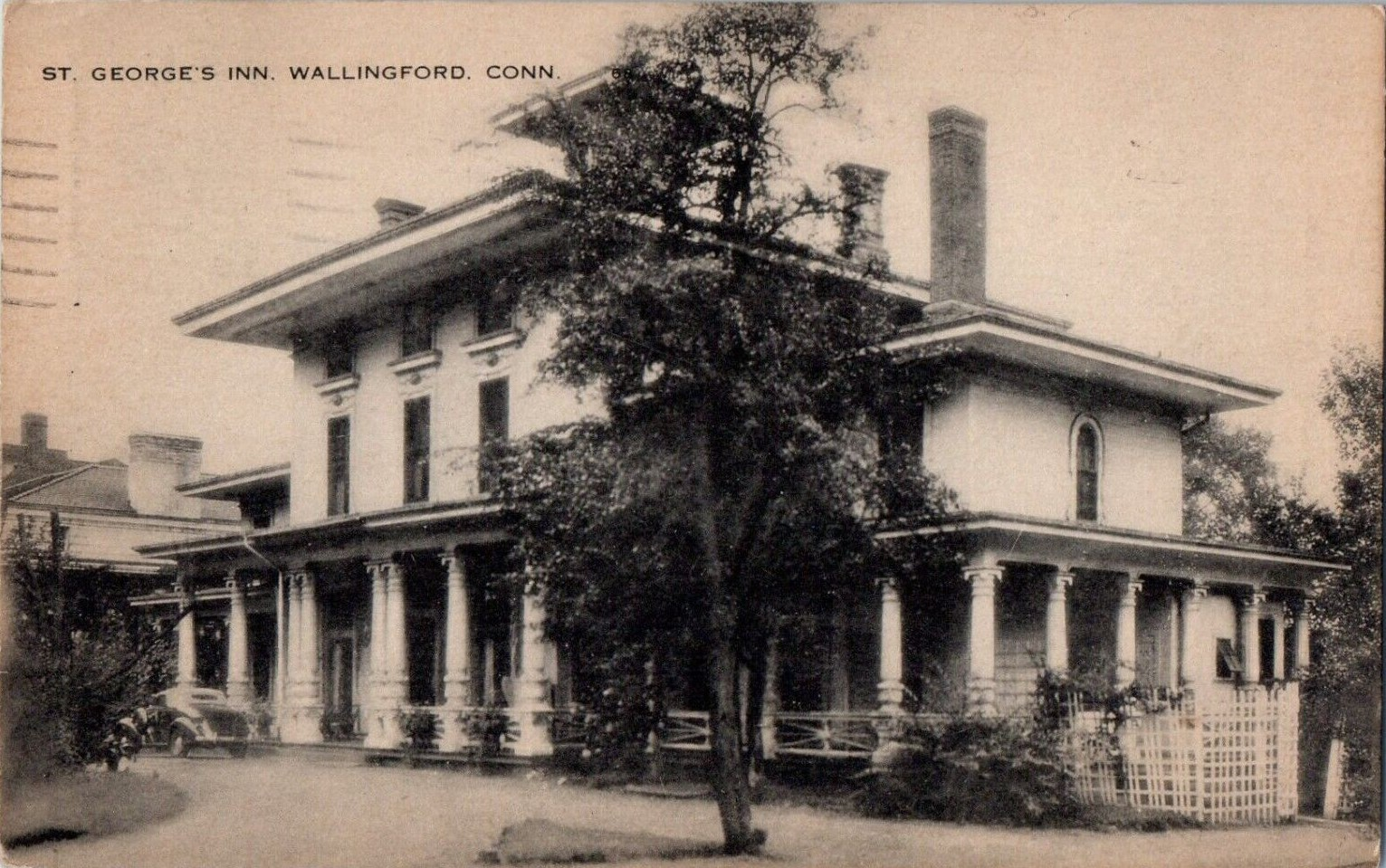
William Yale Beach's home in Wallingford, Connecticut, built by his father Moses Yale Beach in 1846

William Yale Beach (1836 – 1910) was a banker and businessman from Connecticut, son of penny press pioneer Moses Yale Beach. His private bank was the first banking institution of Wallingford, and the largest in the city. He also did business with the freemasons and developed a number of streets in Wallingford.

== Early life ==
William Yale Beach was born in Wallingford, Connecticut, on January 7, 1836, to Nancy Day and Moses Yale Beach, members of the Yale family. Among his 7 siblings were innovator Alfred Ely Beach and politician Moses S. Beach.

His uncle was Benjamin Henry Day, cofounder of the New York Sun and pioneer of the penny press in America, and his cousin, Clarence Day, was the cofounder of Yale University Press. His nephews were Scientific American co-proprietor, Frederick C. Beach, father of aviation pioneer Stanley Yale Beach, and businessman Charles Yale Beach.

== Biography ==
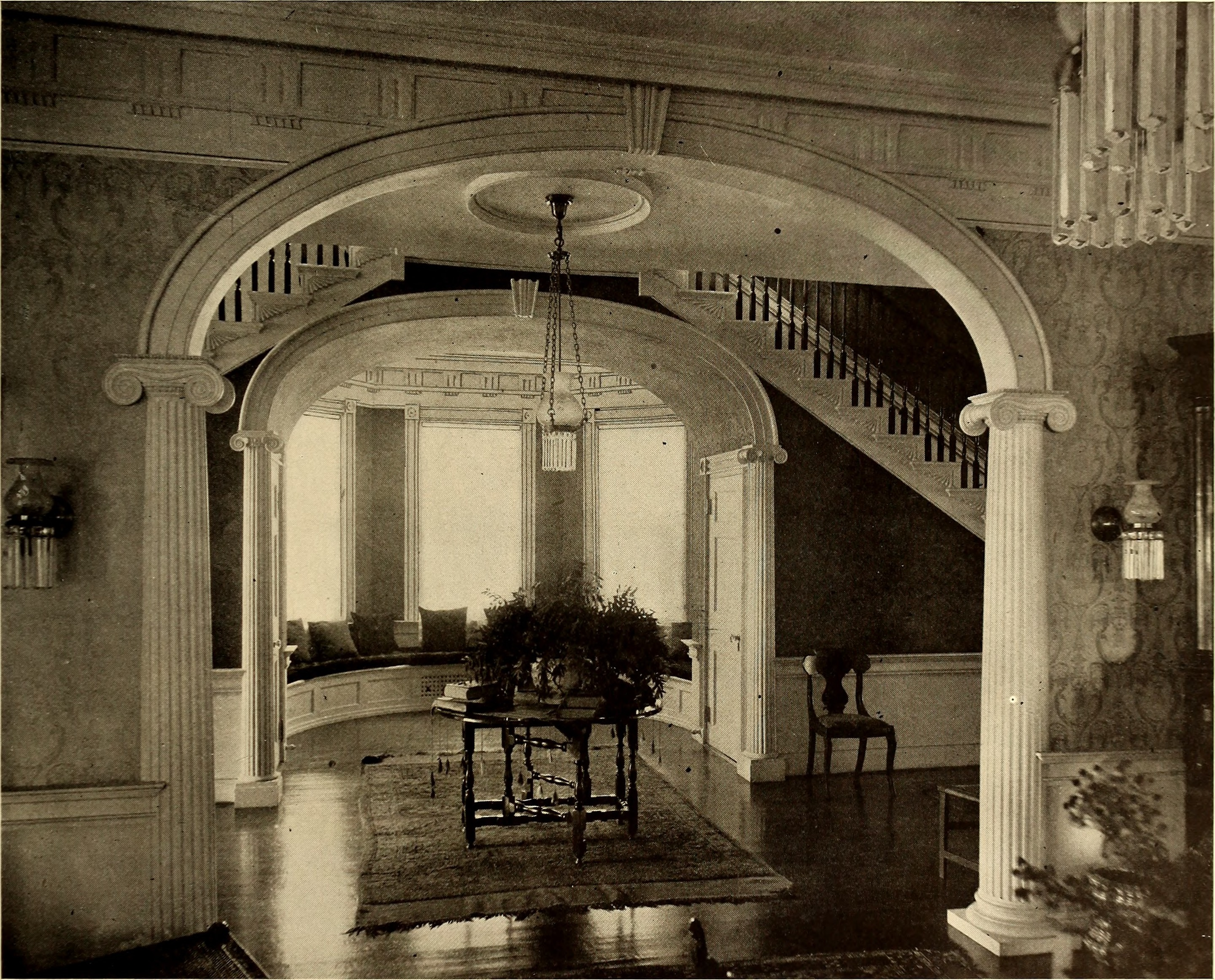
Interior staircase at the Moses Y. Beach mansion, home of William Yale Beach

In 1856, Beach started his career learning business from his father and brothers, and sold his coal business to Capt. John Hendrick, the oldest in the city. At the death of his father in 1868, he inherited the Beach estate, including his father's Italianate mansion built in 1846 at a cost of $62,000, or about 50 million dollars in 2024 money in relation to income. The house was built by architect Henry Austin with the contractor and laborers brought from Italy, and had 16 bedrooms.

Beach lived in the home and later sold the property, which became for a time, the home of Senator Frank M. Boyce, a hotel, a boarding house and a property of Choate Rosemary Hall, a school founded by Judge William Gardner Choate and a niece of Sarah S. Yale. Choate used the mansion to host the parents of their students while they were visiting the school in Wallingford. The house would later be demolished and converted into a bank.

Beach started his real estate ventures by created four streets in Wallingford, being Church, Meadow, Orchard and William streets, and built a housing development on the land he inherited. He owned a large tract of land on South Main Street near R. Wallace & Sons, and lost over $100,000 in the housing development, as he was too early before the expansion of Simpson, Hall, Miller & Co. and other silver manufacturers.

The first banking facilities of Wallingford were those of William Yale Beach, established prior to the foundation of the first bank in the city named the Dime Savings Bank under president Samuel Simpson. Beach also used his private bank in Connecticut to serve the banking needs of Wallingford prior to the foundation of the First National Bank in 1881. In 1871, he built a banking house between the corner of Main and Academy streets. From 1875 to 1876, William Yale Beach's private bank is recorded as the most important bank in Wallingford, and is among the 52 largest in Connecticut by territories.

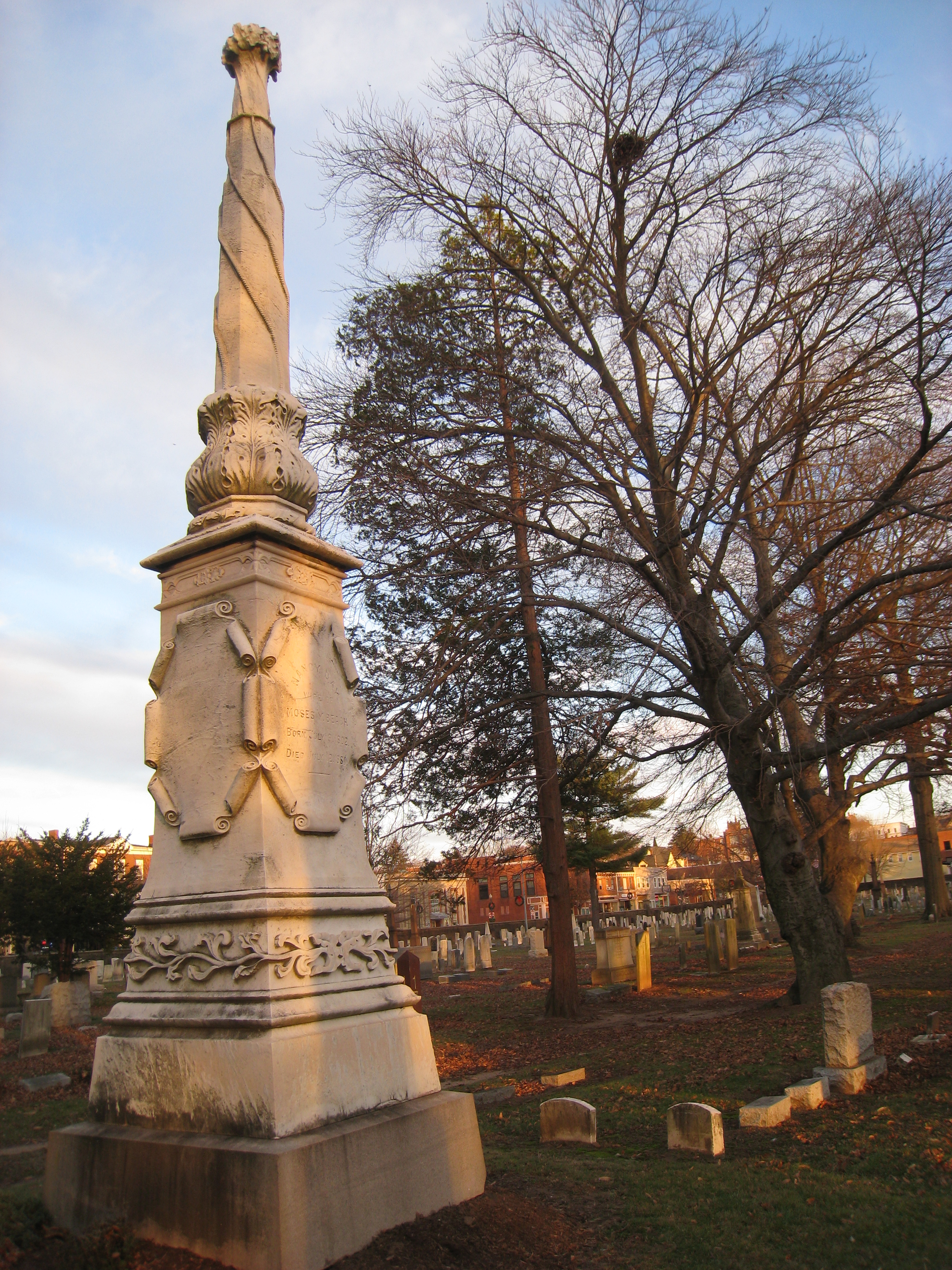
Moses Yale Beach monument, in Wallingford

== Later life ==
Beach would start doing his main real estate transactions in New Haven rather than Wallingford. He then passed most of his business career in New York and became a large real estate investor in the city. He was among the memorialists who addressed the New York State Senate regarding real estate improvements in the city of New York, with Maturin Livingston and many others. He is recorded doing business with the Freemasons of the Masonic Temples of New York and Boston.

Toward the later years of his career, he was connected with his brother Alfred Ely Beach and his nephew Frederick C. Beach at Scientific American Magazine in New York City. In 1883, he is recorded superintendent of a mine in Wallingford, owned by his brothers Moses S. Beach and Alfred Ely, which was attacked by Indians. In 1886, he went to Minneapolis, Minnesota, and was engaged in the lumber business.

He was also involved with the land donation of his father to Wallingford to establish a school named the Moses Y. Beach Elementary School. He was a member of the school committee with Samuel Simpson of Simpson, Hall, Miller & Co., stepson of Mary Yale.

William Yale Beach died at 75 years of age on December 10, 1910, at his home in Stratford, Connecticut. He was married to Emma A. Munson on October 2, 1861. He was the great-granduncle of Rev. Brewster Yale Beach.
