= Alfred Ely Beach =

American inventor, publisher, and patent lawyer (1826–1896)

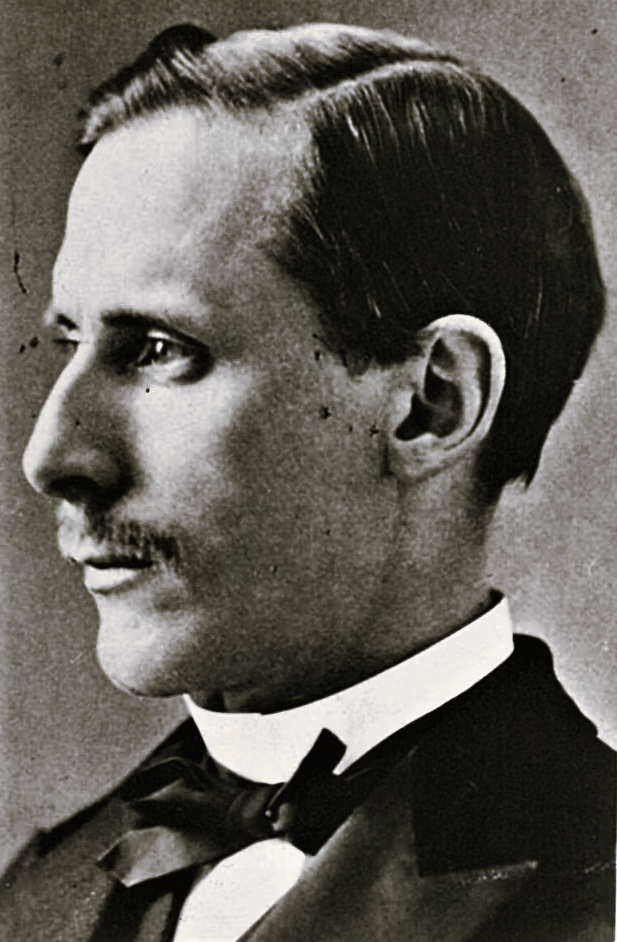
- Beach c. 1870
- Born: September 1, 1826; Springfield, Massachusetts, US
- Died: January 1, 1896 (aged 69); New York City, US
- Education: Monson Academy (now Wilbraham & Monson Academy)
- Occupations: Inventor; publisher; patent lawyer
- Known for: Designing the Beach Pneumatic Transit
- Spouse: Harriet Eliza Holbrook
- Children: Frederick Converse Beach
- Father: Moses Yale Beach
- Relatives: Moses S. Beach, brother William Yale Beach, brother Charles Yale Beach, nephew Stanley Yale Beach, grandson
- Family: Yale

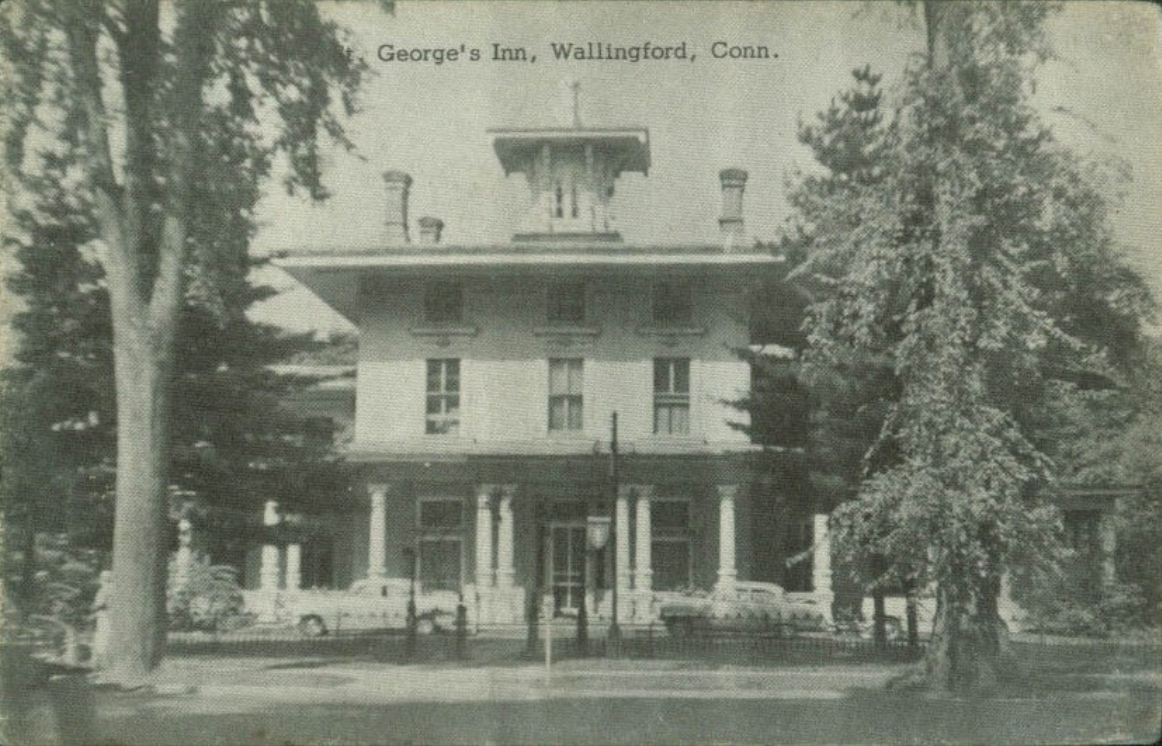
Childhood home of Alfred Ely Beach, built by his father in 1846

Alfred Ely Beach (September 1, 1826 – January 1, 1896) was an American inventor, entrepreneur, publisher, and patent lawyer, born in Springfield, Massachusetts. He is known for his design of the earliest predecessor to the New York City Subway, the Beach Pneumatic Transit, which became the first subway in America. He was an early owner and cofounder of Scientific American and Munn & Co., the country's leading patent agency, and helped secure patents for Thomas Edison, Alexander Graham Bell, Cornelius Vanderbilt, and other innovators. A member of the Union League of New York, he also invented a typewriter for the blind and a system for heating water with solar power.

== Early years ==
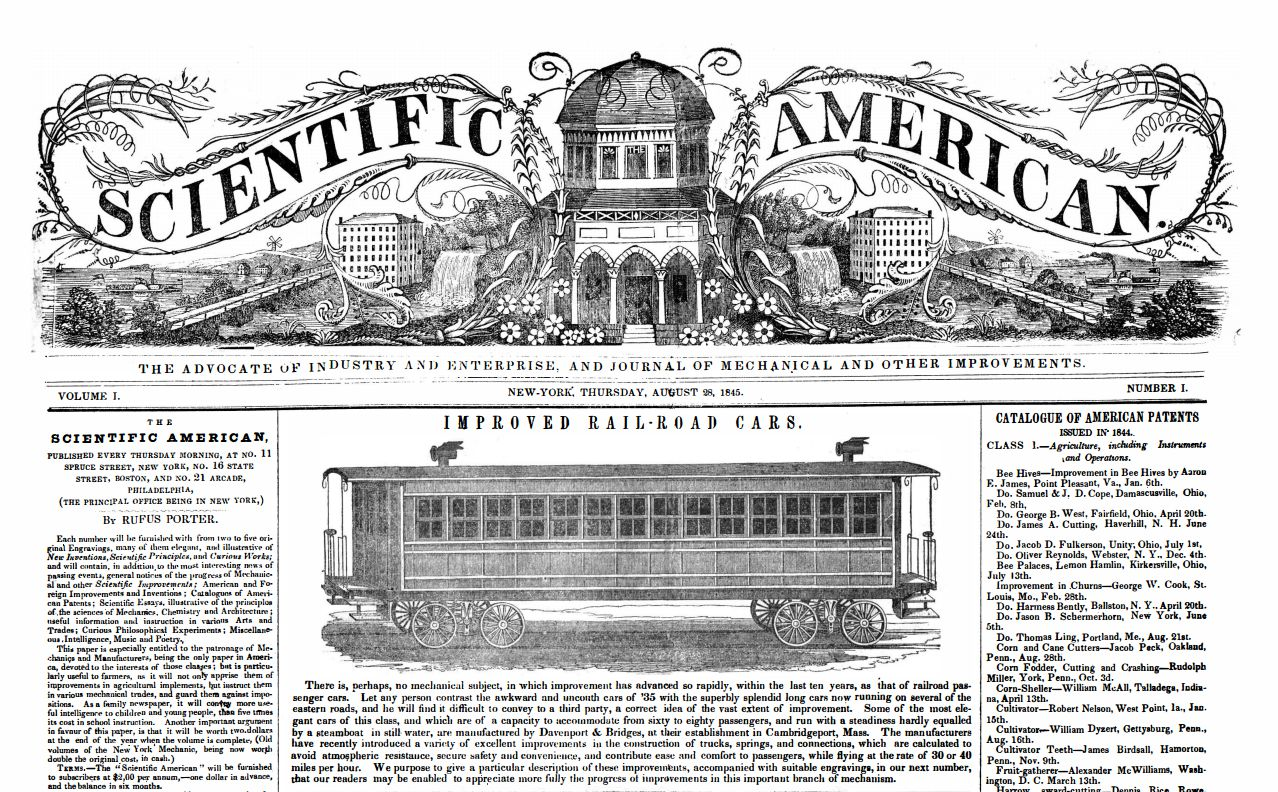
Scientific American in 1845, a magazine that was a major force for the diffusion of innovations during the 19th century

Beach was born in Springfield, Massachusetts, and was the son of a prominent publisher, Moses Yale Beach, owner of the New York Sun and member of the Yale family. His brother William Yale Beach was a banker while his other brother, Moses S. Beach, took over the family newspaper and supported the policies of Abraham Lincoln during his ownership. Alfred's brother was also later a trustee and shareholder in his Broadway Underground Railway Company, along with his son Frederick C. Beach, and his nephew Charles Yale Beach.

Charles Yale's brothers-in-law were Commodore Holland Newton Stevenson, and John McAllister Stevenson, a Yale graduate and board director of the Pittsfield Electric Street Railway Company in 1892, which operated electric trolley cars, replacing horsecars. His three nephews and his great-grandnephew, Rev. Brewster Yale Beach, all attended Yale University.

Alfred worked for his father at the "Sun" until he and a friend, Orson Desaix Munn, decided to buy Scientific American, a relatively new publication, becoming the early founders of that company. He also brought in the venture Salem Howe Wales, President of the New York City Department of Docks and co-founder of the Metropolitan Museum of Art. Beach was the editor and publisher of Scientific American for fifty years and ran the magazine until his death. It was then edited by his son and grandson.

Scientific American is now the oldest continuously published magazine in the United States, and has featured prominent scientists over time such as Albert Einstein, Nikola Tesla, Marie Curie, and Thomas Edison. They reported the invention and patent of Abraham Lincoln relating to his device that intended to help boats navigate shallows.

On June 30, 1847, at 21, Alfred married 18-year-old Harriet Eliza Holbrook.

== Munn & Co. ==
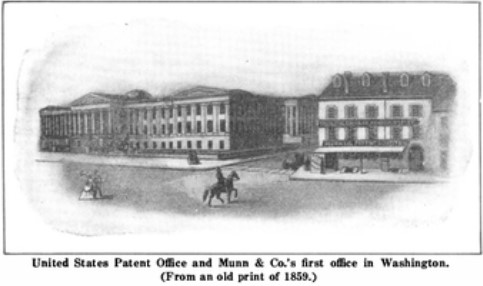
Munn & Co. in 1859, patent office headquarters in Washington, next to the United States Patent Office

In 1846, Munn and Beach established a prominent patent agency within Scientific American named Munn & Co., in synergy with the scientists featured in the magazine who wanted to patent their inventions. They provided the service for the patent applications and tracked the progress once it reached the U.S. Patent Office, having their headquarters next door in Washington.

As a boy, Thomas Edison used to walk a few miles every week to get his copy of the magazine, and later on in his career, he walked in Beach's office one day and showed him a device he called the phonograph, being the first to see his invention. Beach tested the device with Edison, liked it, and helped him file the patent. Edison would become a frequent visitor of Beach.

He also helped Alexander Graham Bell, Samuel F. B. Morse, Elias Howe, R. J. Gatling, Capt. John Ericsson, Cornelius Vanderbilt, Col. John Jacob Astor IV, and thousands of other inventors. The magazine's patent department eventually filed about three thousand patents a year, forcing Beach to split his time between New York and Washington, defending the patents of the inventors in court.

Beach patented some of his own inventions, notably an early typewriter designed for use by the blind, an engineering first for the Americas. He received the gold medal by the American Institute at the New York Crystal Palace for the Great Exhibition of 1853, and his invention served as the prototype for typewriters over the next century. He invented a cable traction railway system, and designed and built one of the world's first tunnelling shields in the same year as famed engineer James Henry Greathead.

His patent agency eventually brought him fame and fortune, and his magazine helped stimulate 19th-century technological innovations and became one of the most prestigious scientific magazines of its time. During its peak years, Munn & Co., as the patent agency of Scientific American, prosecuted about one third of all the patents issued by the US Patent Office. By 1924, they had filled more than 200,000 patents, representing about 15% of all the patents filled in the United States, and was partly responsible for the rapid growth of the US patent system. After opening an office in Washington, they opened new offices across the globe and became recognized as the most successful patent law firm in the world.

== Invention of a subway ==
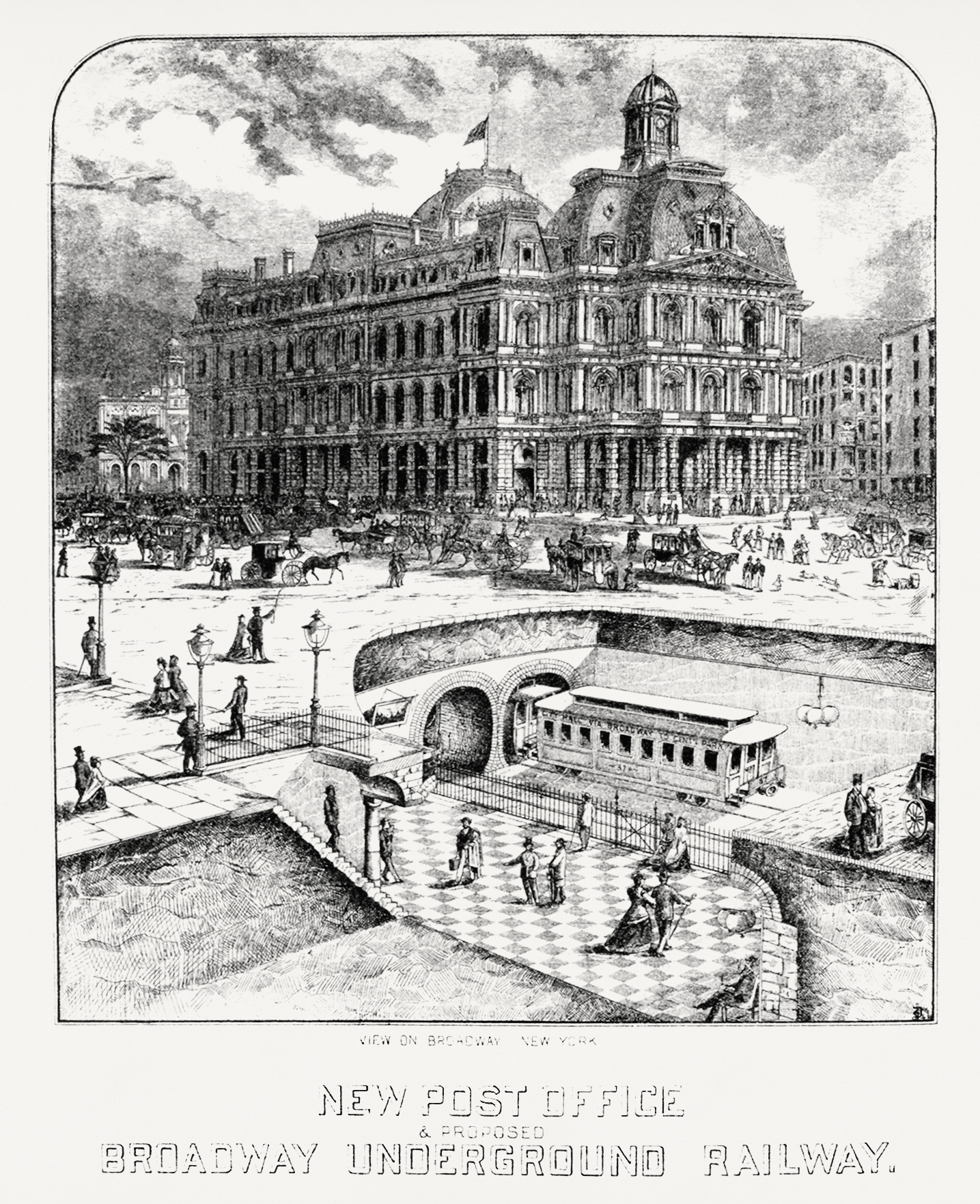
Broadway underground railway (1872), New York, next to City Hall

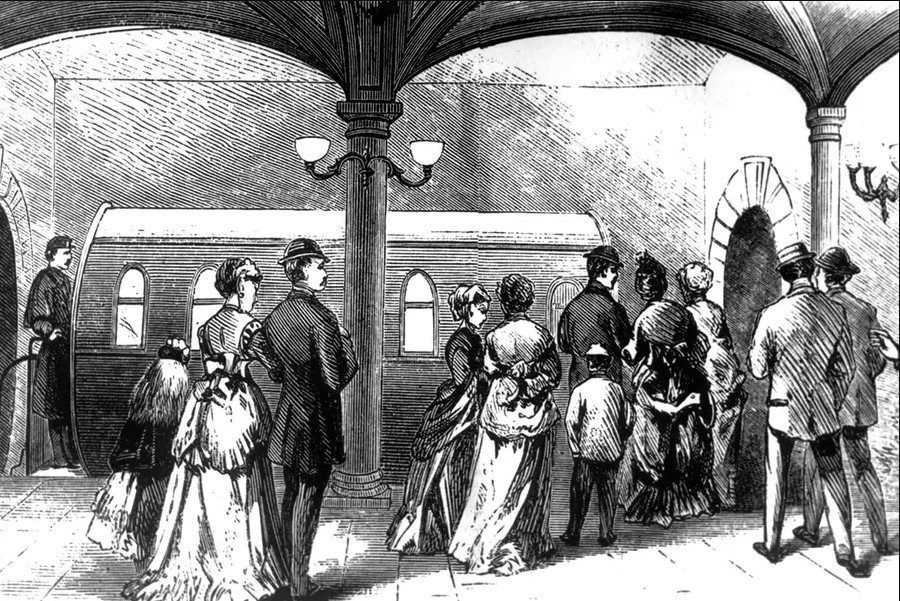
Socialites waiting in the Beach Pneumatic Transit station under Broadway

Beach's most famous invention was New York City's first subway, the Beach Pneumatic Transit. He received his first charter by the legislature in 1868, four years before Commodore Vanderbilt's attempt to build a subway in New York. Beach created his own enterprise using pneumatic tube technology, naming it the Beach Pneumatic Transit Company, and made himself its President. This idea came about during the late 1860s, when traffic in New York was very difficult, especially along its central artery of Broadway, crowded with pedestrians and horse carriages. Beach was one of a few visionaries who proposed building an underground railway under Broadway to help relieve the traffic congestion. The inspiration was the underground Metropolitan Railway in London, but in contrast to that and others' proposals for New York, Beach proposed the use of trains propelled by pneumatics instead of conventional steam engines, and construction using a tunnelling shield of his invention to minimize disturbing the street.

Beach used a circular design based upon Marc Isambard Brunel's rectangular shield, which may represent the shift in design from rectangular to cylindrical. It was unclear when or who transitioned tunneling shield design from rectangular to circular until The New York Times wrote an article describing the original Beach tunneling shield in 1870.

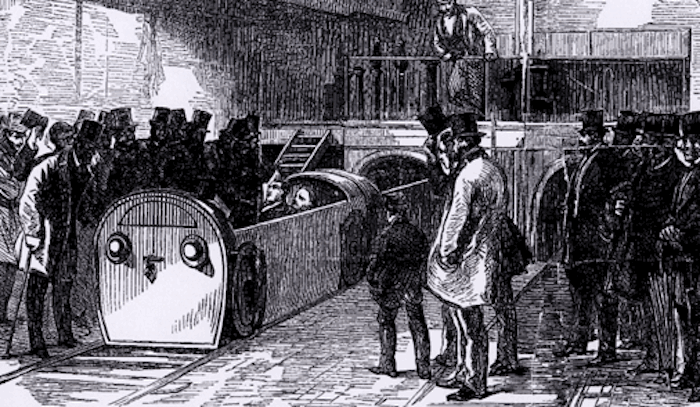
London Pneumatic Despatch Company, inspiration for Beach's mail system

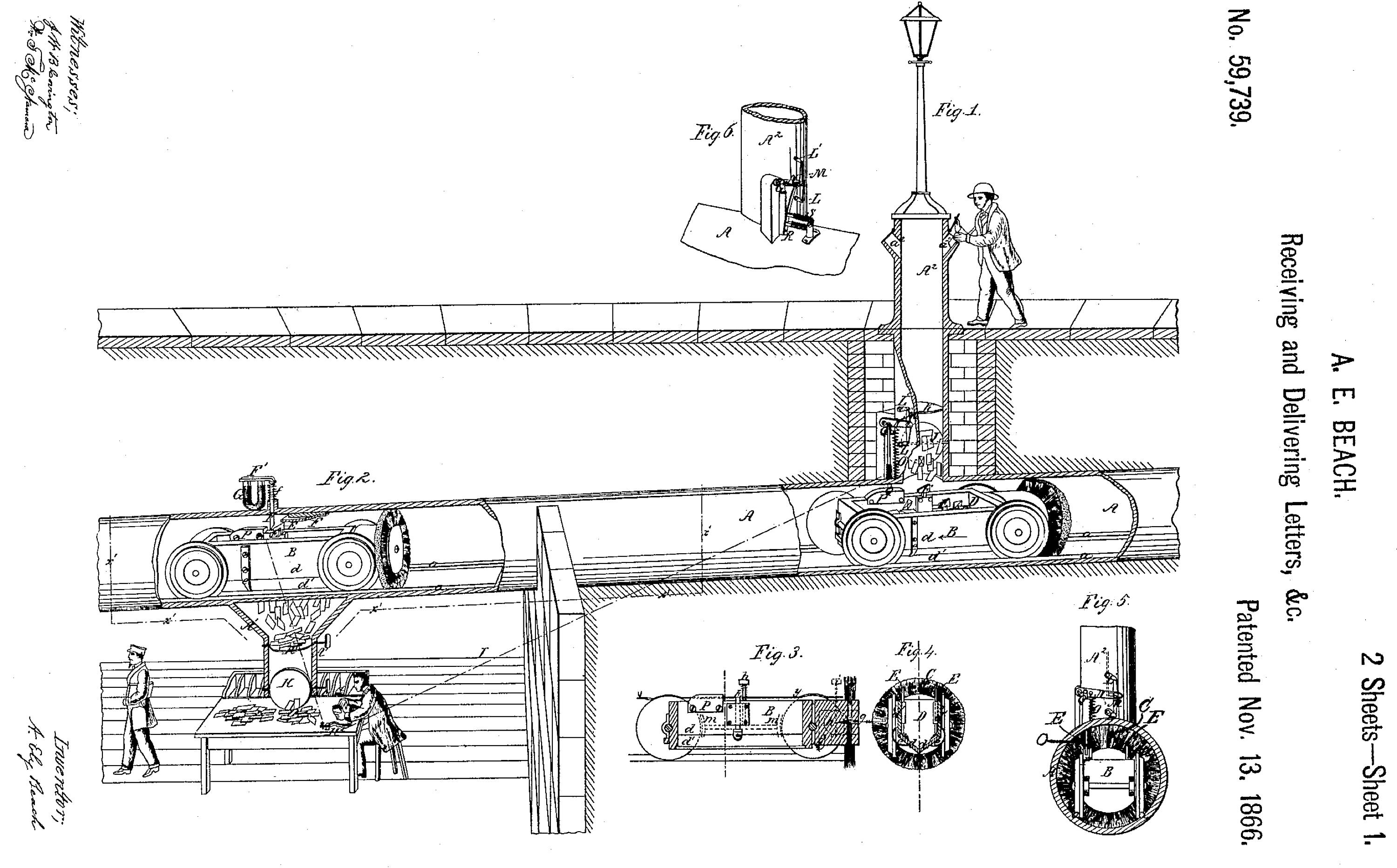
Plan of the patent of Beach Pneumatic Transit mailing system with pneumatic cars used to deliver packages through an underground railroad network

Beach was also interested in pneumatic tubes for the transport of letters and packages, another idea recently put into use in London by the London Pneumatic Despatch Company. He refused to bribe corrupt politician "Boss" Tweed to have his proposal approved. Instead, he built the tunnel in secret during the night, carting away the dirt under the cover of darkness, with the city officials at City Hall just across the street. He put up $350,000 of his own money to bankroll the project, allowing him to bypass the corruption and extortion schemes of Tammany Hall, which included the Governor, the Mayor, the City comptroller, and countless of other corrupted officials. His thinking was that once the public saw the completed subway, the politicians would not dare to stop him. With a franchise from the state, he began construction of a tunnel for small pneumatic tubes in 1869, but diverted it into a demonstration of a passenger railway that opened on February 26, 1870. It is most interesting to note that Beach's tunnel design was likely the first cylindrical tunnel design ever used in the Americas and built using a design inspired by James Henry Greathead's successful shield patents in London for construction of the Tower Subway project. Greathead invented and built his own design of a shield as the contractor for that project, under Peter W. Barlow who was the engineer. Since Beach was a patents lawyer, it is likely he discovered the 1869 Greathead patent and the patent application by Barlow from 1864, using an imitated Barlow's patent design for engineering the PTS tunnel design.

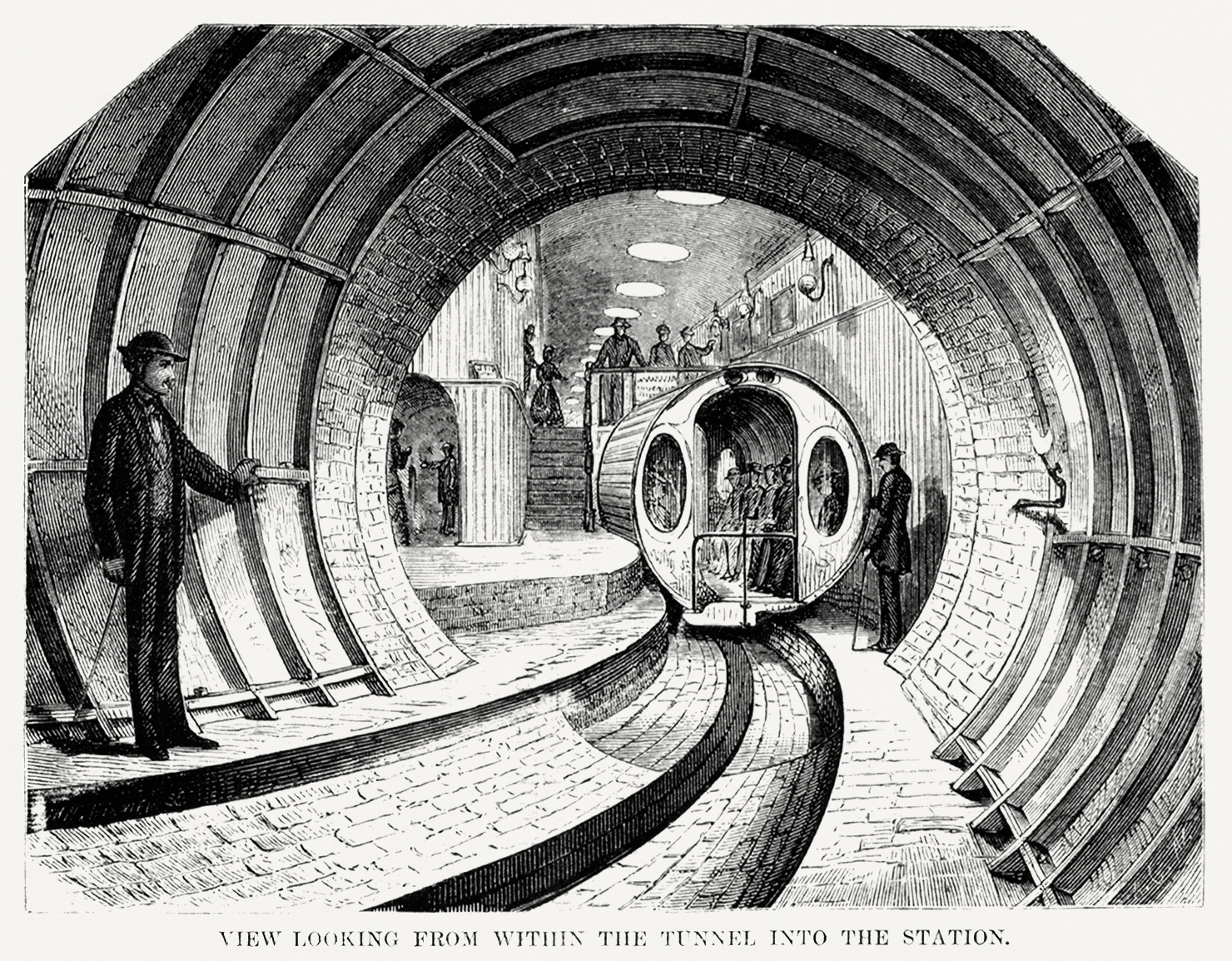
Illustration of the Broadway underground railway (1872) by New York Parcel Dispatch Company

To build a passenger railway he needed a different franchise, something he lobbied for over four legislative sessions, 1870 to 1873. Construction of the tunnel was obvious from materials being delivered to Warren Street near Broadway, and was documented in newspaper reports, but Beach kept all details secret until the New York Tribune published a possibly planted article a few weeks before opening. The Mayor of New York, Abraham Oakey Hall, grew suspicious and sent an aide over to the construction site with a written order to inspect Beach's work, but his workers blocked the inspectors.

When it was finished, after 58 successive nights, it became New York City's first underground subway. Beach hosted a gala on February 26, 1870, to which he invited city and state officials, enraging "Boss Tweed" for not having profited from the venture, and for challenging his monopoly on streetcars. In less than a year, Beach's underground system was used by 400,000 people, and he requested his line to extend to Central Park, with an injection of 5 million dollars in capital, hoping to get financiers such as John Jacob Astor III in the venture.

=== Downfall ===
In 1870 New York state Senator William M. Tweed introduced a bill to fund the full construction of Beach's subway but the bill did not pass. By the end of 1871 Tweed's Tammany Hall political machine was in disgrace and from then on Beach, in an effort to gain support from reformers, claimed that Tweed had opposed his subway. The real opposition to the subway was from politically connected property owners along Broadway, led by Alexander Turney Stewart and John Jacob Astor III, who feared that tunnelling would damage buildings and interfere with surface traffic. Bills for Beach's subway passed the legislature in 1871 and 1872 but were vetoed by Governor John T. Hoffman because he said that they gave away too much authority without compensation to the city or state. In 1873 Governor John Adams Dix signed a similar bill into law, but Beach was not able to raise funds to build over the next six months, and then the Panic of 1873 dried up the financial markets.

During this same time, other investors had built an elevated railway at Greenwich Street and Ninth Avenue, which operated successfully with a small steam engine starting in 1870. This elevated railway gave an idea to James Henry Greathead for the Docker's Umbrella in Liverpool, which was a similar idea for an overhead railway for the purpose of easing congestion on the ground in England. The wealthy property owners did not object to the New York City railway well away from Broadway, and by the mid-1870s it appeared that elevated railways were practical and underground railways were not, setting the pattern for rapid transit development in New York City for the remainder of the 19th century.

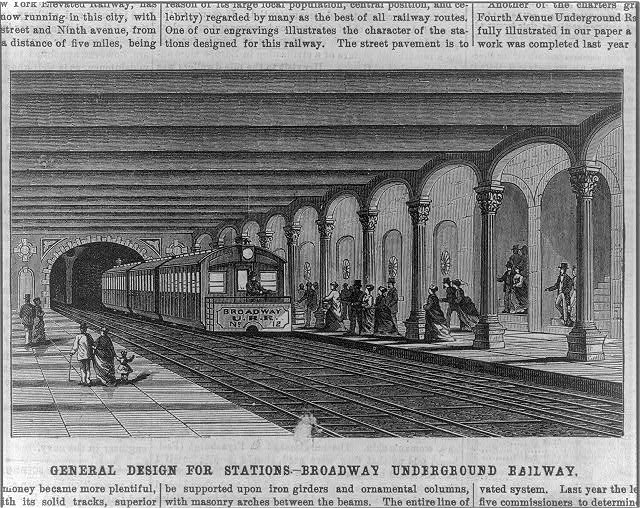
General design, station – Broadway Underground Railway, 1872

Beach operated his demonstration railway from February 1870 to April 1873. It had one station in the basement of Devlin's clothing store, a building at the southwest corner of Broadway and Warren Street. The Woolworth Building would be built next door, with an underground entrance connecting to the subway station, but it was later closed down because of fear of criminal activities.

It ran for a total of about 300 feet, first around a curve to the center of Broadway and then straight under the center of Broadway to the south side of Murray Street. Beach spent $70,000 of his own savings to make the station luxurious and comfortable, with chandeliers, mirrors, a towering grandfather clock, a fountain with fish, paintings and a piano. The former Devlin's building was destroyed by fire in 1898. When the subway tunnel closed down, Beach rented out the space as a wine cellar, and later as a shooting range and a storage vault.

The profits made by Beach from the subway were given to charities, promising to donate all the money raised to the United Home for the Orphans of Soldiers and Sailors. He later also developed a pneumatic tube systems for New York's mail, building the first mail tube in the country.

In 1912 workers for Degnon Contracting excavated the tunnel proper during the construction of a subway line running under Broadway, discovering the old tunnel and the old station that was buried underground. They also discovered Beach's old tunnelling shield and remains of Gotham's original subway car. The new tunnel was completely within the limits of the present day City Hall station under Broadway, near the old City Hall station. The British pneumatic tube also failed to attract much attention and eventually fell into disrepair and disrepute in spite of the fact that Royal Mail had contracted to use the tunnels. Ultimately the English experiment failed due to technical issues as well as lack of funds.

== Beach's designs for US Postal Mail Service ==
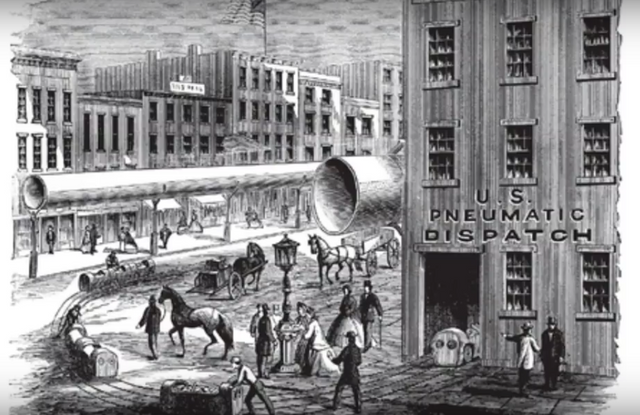
US Pneumatic Dispatch Company, proposed by Alfred Ely Beach, 1868

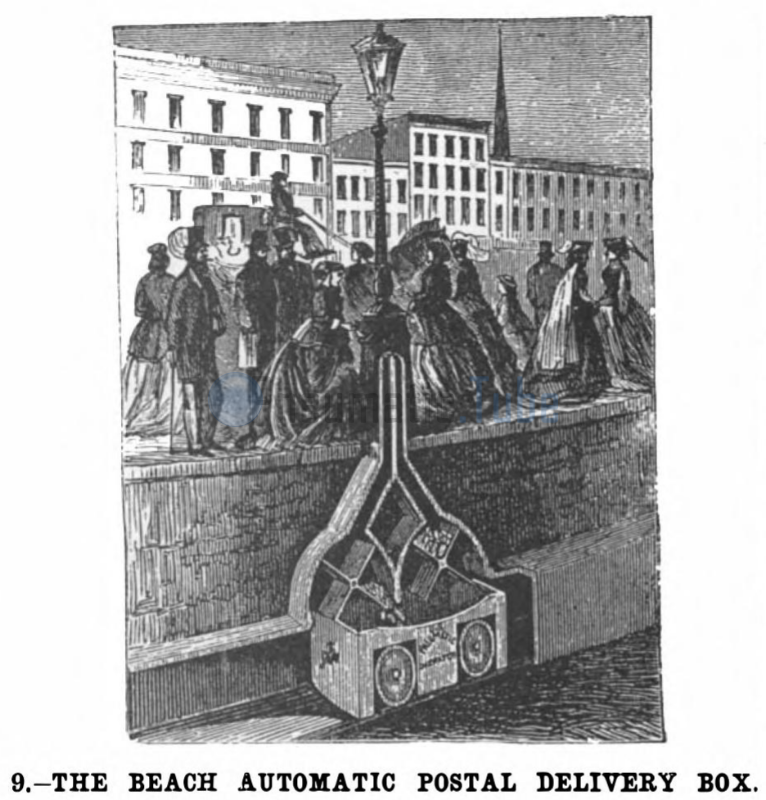
The Pneumatic Dispatch, taking letters from the lamp-post

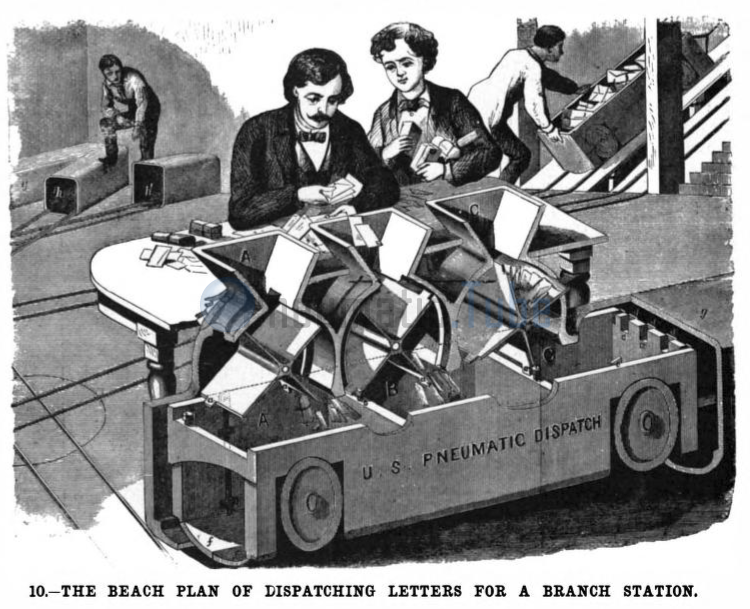
The Alfred Ely Beach Plan of Dispatching Letters for a Branch Station

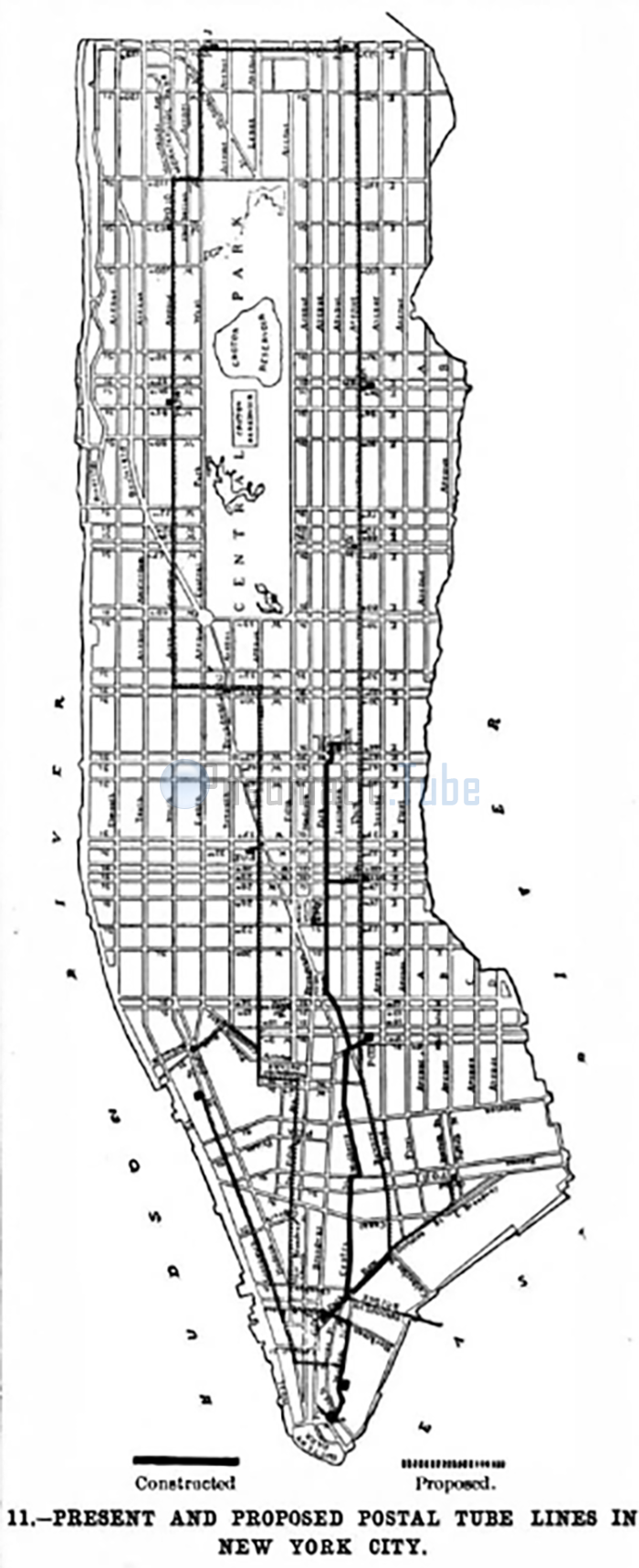
Proposed Postal Tube Lines in New York City

== Death and legacy ==
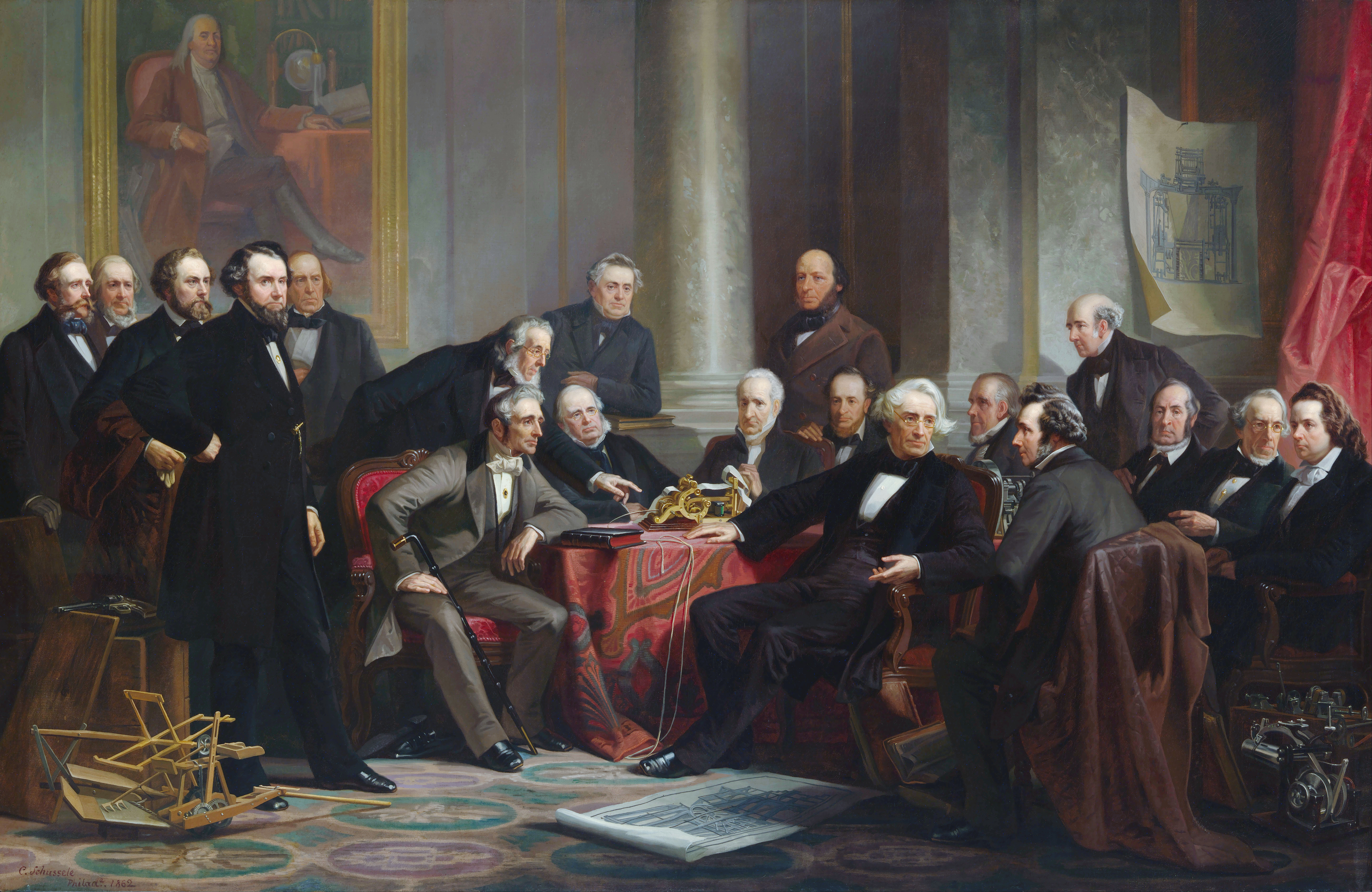
"Men of Progress", published by Scientific American and Munn & Co. in 1862, showing American inventors Samuel Morse, John Ericsson, Elias Howe, Samuel Colt, Cyrus McCormick, Charles Goodyear, Peter Cooper, etc

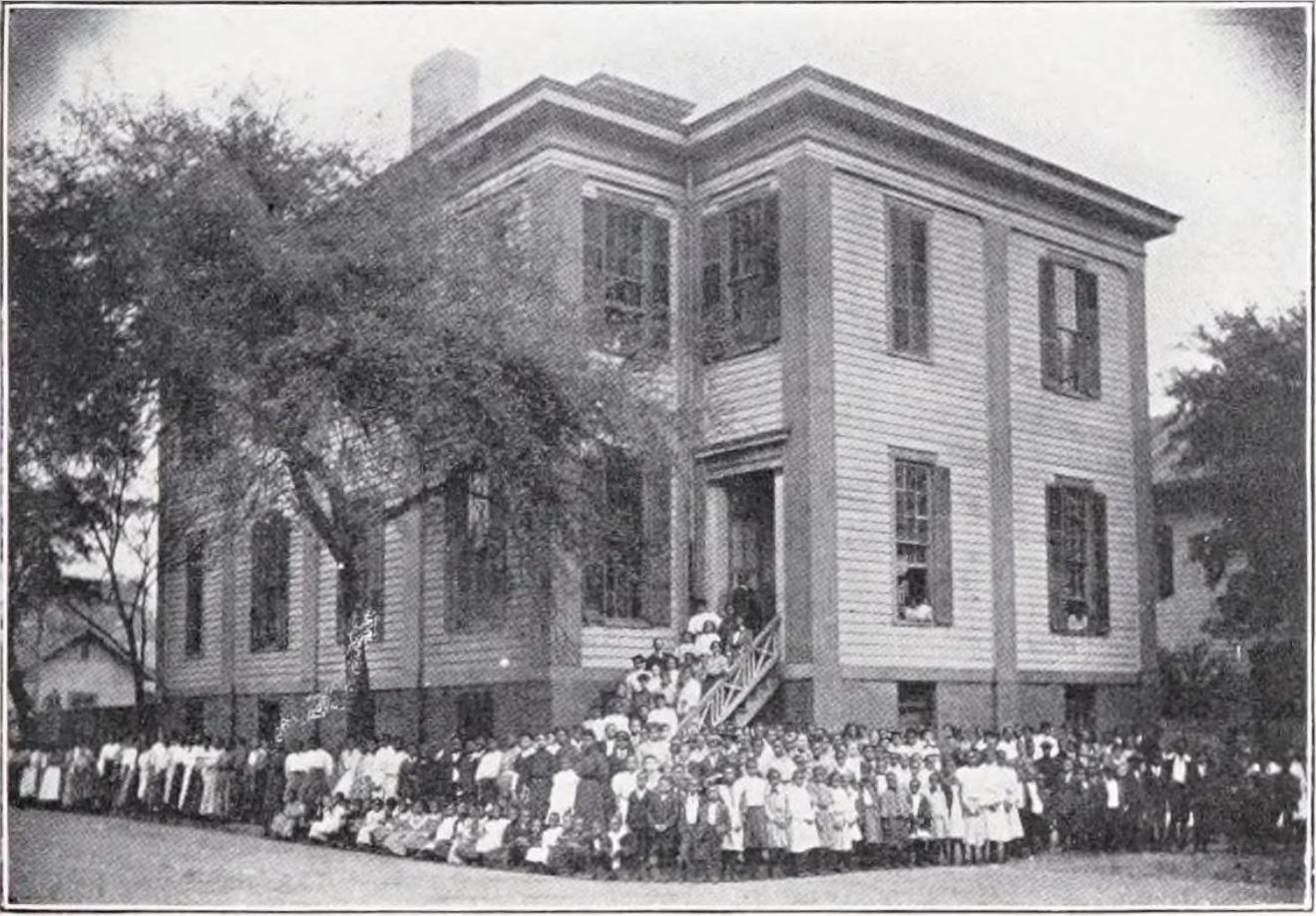
The Beach Institute, founded by Alfred Ely Beach for newly freed African Americans

Much of the Beach subway story was recalled as precedent by Lawrence Edwards in his lead article of the August 1965 issue of Scientific American, which described his invention of gravity-vacuum transit. Beach's story is also featured in Gotham: A History of New York City to 1898.

The Beach Tunnelling shield, similar to the 1864 English patent idea of Barlow's, was used in the construction of the Grand Trunk Railway, headquartered in Montreal, Canada's first St. Clair Tunnel between Port Huron, Michigan and Sarnia, Ontario. This tunnel opened in 1890. His hydraulic shield system was also used in the excavating of the underground railway tunnels in London and Glasgow, the North River Tunnels and other construction works.

Beach's pneumatic system was the first air-powered train in America, a concept that would be proposed once again about 150 years later by billionaire Elon Musk, rebranded as the Hyperloop. The team Hyperloop II of the Hyperloop pod competition sponsored by SpaceX also used Beach's pneumatic concept and made the pneumatic vehicle more efficient.

In January 1887, Beach allowed his son and six other men to start a yacht club on his property in Stratford, Connecticut. The Housatonic boat club is the oldest operating yacht club in Connecticut, and the land purchased for the club came from his estate in 1954.

After the Civil War, Beach founded a school for freed slaves in Savannah, Georgia, the Beach Institute, which is now the home of the King-Tisdell Cottage Foundation. It was the first school in Savannah erected specifically for the education of African Americans, and was built by Freedmen's Bureau, at the initiation of President Lincoln, and was managed by the American Missionary Association. Alumni include Mayor Otis Johnson and Senator Regina Thomas.

Beach was also a member of the Union League Club of New York, an abolitionist society that supported the policies of Abraham Lincoln. Pneumatic tubes are still used today by banks and the CIA for their headquarters, and less than a decade after Beach's death, New York City built its first subway system in 1904, and have him featured in the history of the New York City Subway.

Beach later was the subject of the 1976 Klaatu single "Sub-Rosa Subway."

He died of pneumonia on January 1, 1896, in New York City at the age of 69.

He had a son named Frederick Converse Beach, who invented a photolithographic process and ran Scientific American, and a grandson named Stanley Yale Beach, who worked for the magazine as well but also became an aviation pioneer, and an early financier of Gustave Whitehead, the contested first maker of a powered controlled flight before the Wright brothers.

Both were Yale graduates, having graduated from Yale's Sheffield Scientific School.
