= Stanley Yale Beach =

Aviation pioneer from New York (1877-1955)

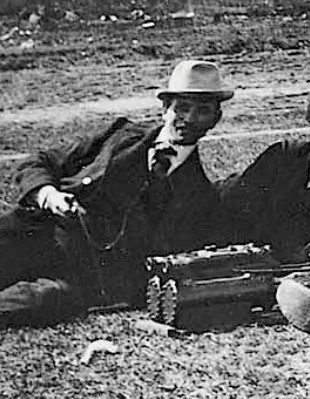
- Stanley Yale Beach
- Born: July 9, 1877; Stratford, Connecticut
- Died: July 13, 1955 (aged 78); New York City
- Education: Yale University
- Occupations: Editor, banker, aircraft builder, airships builder
- Known for: early backer of Gustave Whitehead
- Children: 3
- Parent: Frederick C. Beach
- Relatives: Alfred Ely Beach, grandfather Moses S. Beach, granduncle Moses Yale Beach, great-grandfather
- Family: Yale

Stanley Yale Beach (1877 – 1955) was a wealthy aviation pioneer, who was an early financier of Gustave Whitehead, who claimed to have made powered controlled flight before the Wright brothers. He was among the first technically trained men to be involved in dynamic flight in the United States, and was an early automobilist, following the beginnings of the development of the automobile industry as Automobile Editor of Scientific American, their family scientific magazine.

== Early life ==
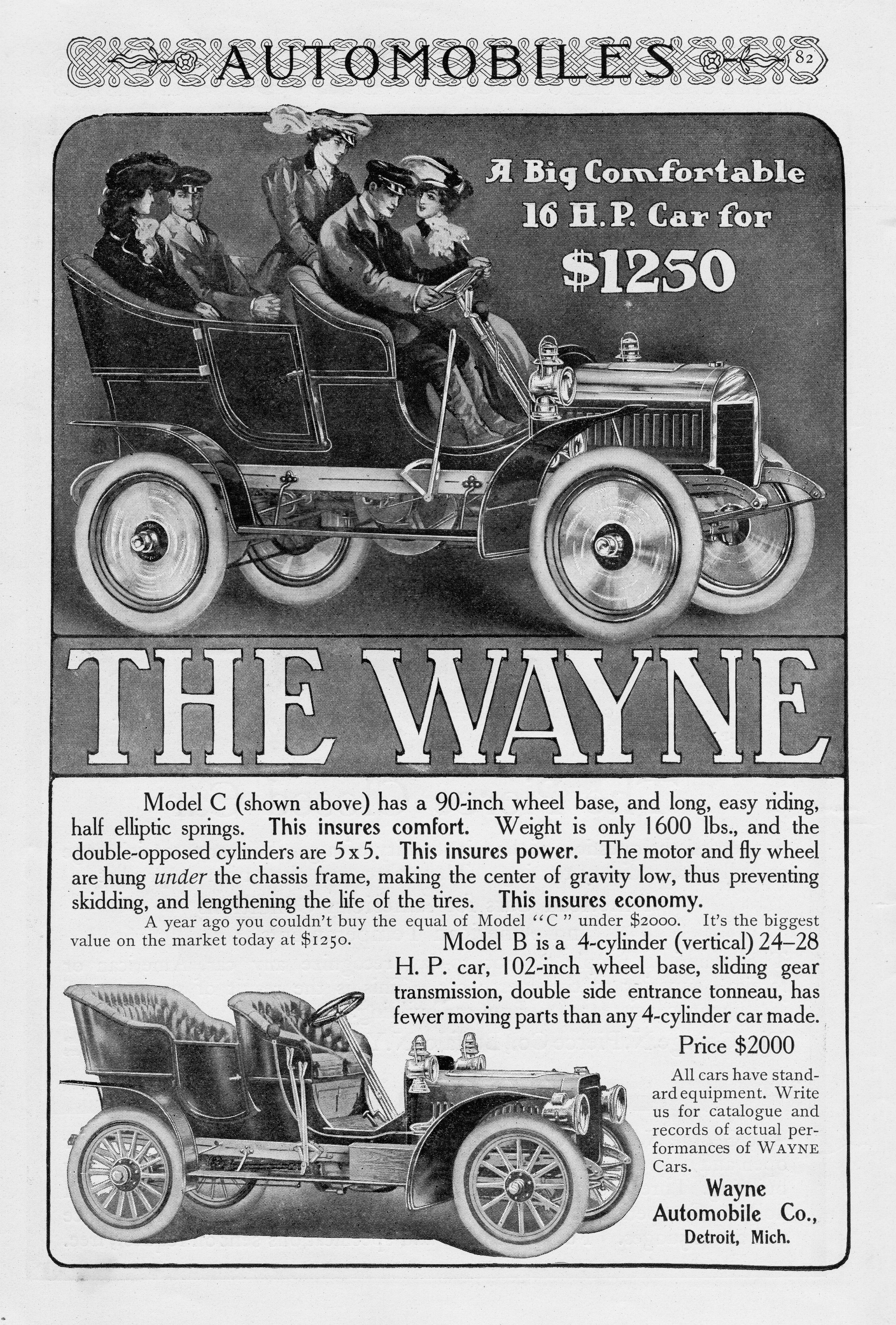
Wayne Cars, by Wayne Automobile Co., Stanley Yale Beach was a buyer of their first model in 1903

Stanley Yale Beach was born in Stratford, Connecticut, on July 9, 1877, to Frederick Converse Beach, editor and co-proprietor of Scientific American, and Margaret A. Gilbert, members of the Yale family.

Beach's paternal grandfather was patent lawyer Alfred Ely Beach, who is most known for his invention of New York's first subway, the Beach Pneumatic Transit, and for his patent agency Munn & Co., with customers including Thomas Edison, Cornelius Vanderbilt and Alexander Graham Bell.

Beach's's great-grandfather was Moses Yale Beach, the cofounder of the New York Sun, which was at the time the largest newspaper in America and the pioneer on crime reporting.

His granduncle was N.Y. abolitionist politician Moses S. Beach, who ran the paper and the Boston Daily Times, supporting the candidancy of Abraham Lincoln during the American Civil War, and his cousin Emma, married to military camouflage expert Abbott Handerson Thayer of the Thayer family.

== Career ==
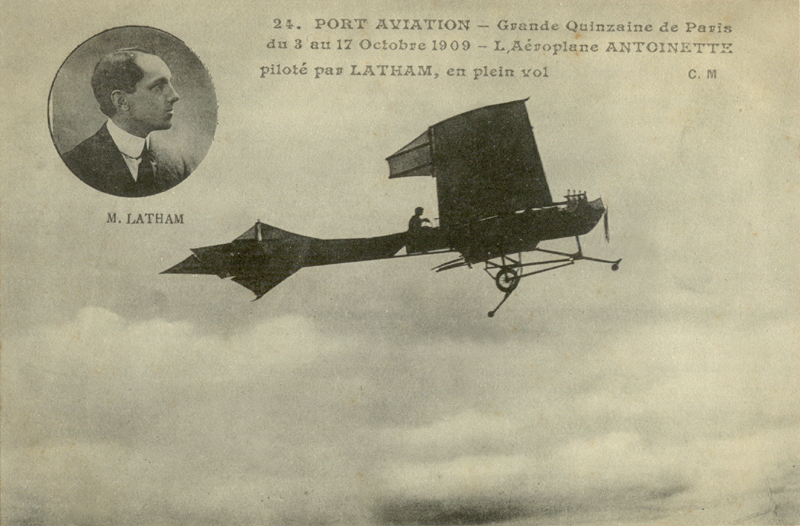
Antoinette monoplanes, built by Antoinette Company, similar to Beach's design with foldable wings.

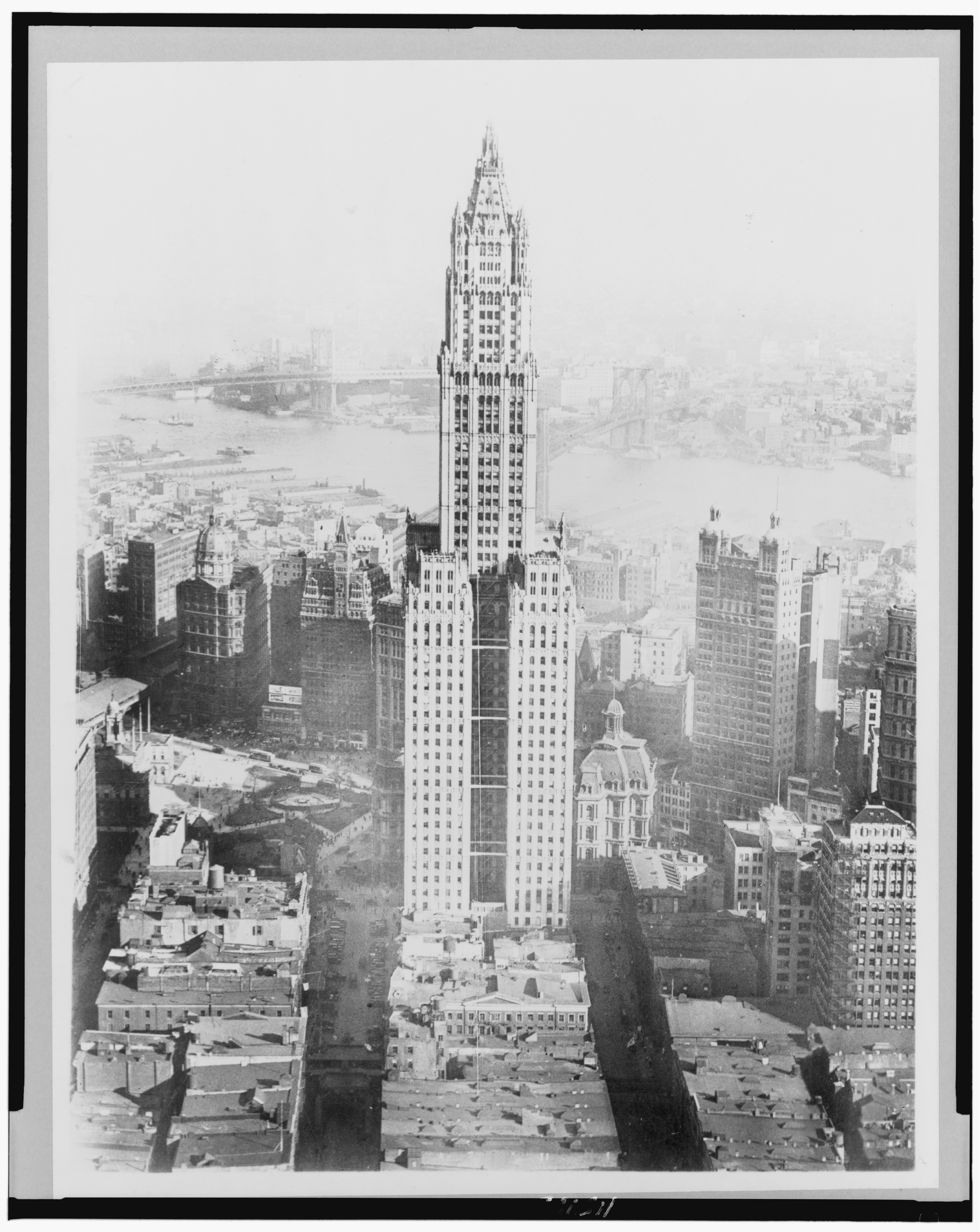
Woolworth Tower, seat of Scientific American in 1915, where Stanley worked for his family as Automobile and Aeronautic Editor

Beach attended Yale Sheffield Scientific School like his father, and afterward developed a lifetime interest in aeronautics, engineering, and inventing. He acquired and ran a single-cylinder Thomas 1903 from the Thomas Motor Company across the country, which was the same year Ford Motors was founded. He acquired in 1904 the newly built two-cylinder Wayne from the Wayne Automobile Company, and traveled most of the southwestern part of New York State with the Wayne.

This company was working with Henry Ford at his beginnings and had their factory next door to his in Detroit. They later merged with the Northern Manufacturing Company and the E-M-F Company, becoming the second largest American car manufacturer after Ford.

Beach began designing airplane engines on his own in 1903. He tried to build a high-speed boat with an airplane engine, and designed a biplane with Gustave Whitehead. He became half-assignor of Whitehead's aeroplane (a glider) patent and signed it as a witness. He also designed monoplanes similar in design to the Antoinette, built by Antoinette manufacturer, and the Blériot XI by Blériot Aéronautique with foldable wings.

Beach described the plane as a machine that was built after the model of a bird or bat, with a 10-horsepower engine, and the body of the framework was referred by Scientific American as a bat-like aeroplane and a bat machine, which Whitehead claimed flew in 1901. These claims preceded the first flight achieved by the Wright brothers in 1903, and have been widely rejected by aviation historians. Beach has been quoted as later stating that "I do not believe that any of [Whitehead's] machines ever left the ground".

Beach worked in the Beach Building on 125 East 23rd Street, Manhattan, but also worked for Scientific American Magazine, the family business, as their "Aeronautic Editor". He wrote numerous articles on automobiles, motor boats and flying machines.

The company was seated at 37 Park Row, and later at 261 Broadway, and finally at 361 Broadway. A few years before his father's death, in 1915, they moved the headquarters to the famous Woolworth Building in Manhattan at 233 Broadway, one of the first skyscrapers, and the tallest building in the world at the time. The building had been finished in 1913, two years earlier, and Nikola Tesla had moved in by 1914.

== Enterprises ==
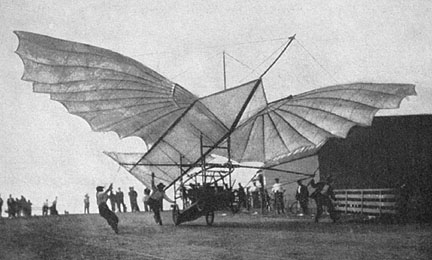
Whitehead's Albatross-type glider

Beach then founded his own enterprises. His businesses were the Beach Engineering Company, the Beach Laboratories Company, the Scientific Aeroplane Company, and the Beach-Basenach Airship Company of America. He also founded associations such as the Aero Science Club, and co founded the Aeronautic Society of New York.

He became a member of the Aero Club of America, along with Vincent Astor, and was one of the original members of the club, covering their first event in 1906. He later created the Scientific Aeroplane Company of Stratford, a Connecticut airplane manufacturer that proposed to build machines for fairs and other amusement enterprises.

In 1910, Beach also made an impact on the aeroplane world by inventing and patenting the first aeroplane with a gyroscope attachment for stability. Around that time, with his Scientific Aeroplane Company of New York, he negotiated with the British government to sell them nine huge triplanes capable of crossing the Atlantic Ocean in one flight, which was regarded with skepticism by aviation experts.

With Charles F. Willard of the Lowe, Willard & Fowler Engineering Company, they've built the Beach-Willard Monoplane, from which they received patents for having invented the connection of planes or wings to a triangular body, enforceable in France, England and America.

In 1915, Beach competed with three other companies to try to win the contract for the construction of the first United States Navy airship, the Project DN-1, for Franklin Delano Roosevelt, who was Assistant Secretary of the Navy at the time. The competitors were the American Dirigible Balloon Syndicate of New York, the Goodyear Tire and Rubber Company of Ohio, and the Connecticut Aircraft Company of Connecticut.

He worked with the Germans, trying to sell airships in America and secure a trans-Atlantic mail contract. When Andrew Carnegie created his new Endowment for International Peace in 1910, Stanley Yale Beach suggested using a portion of the capital to develop wireless power airships to end and prevent future wars.

Through his enterprise, he also contacted in 1930 the young film producer Howard Hughes, in an attempt to sell him an airship which would allow Hughes to travel to Europe in complete privacy and secrecy.

== Legacy ==
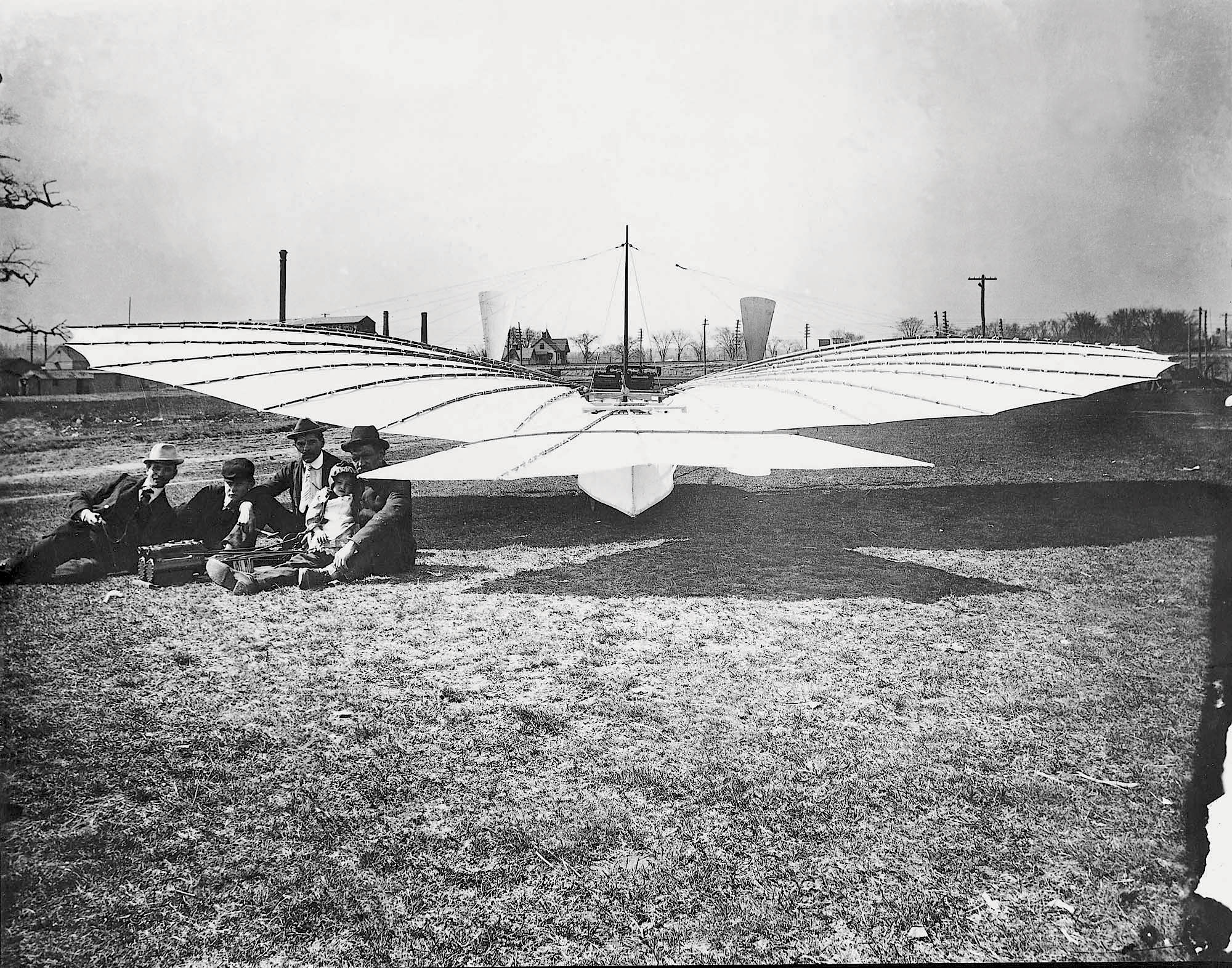
Whitehead's No.21 airplane, Stanley Yale Beach is on the left

His personal correspondences for business interests are part of the Beinecke Rare Book & Manuscript Library at Yale University. Correspondents included Charles Nungesser and François Coli, the aviators who tried the first non-stop transatlantic flight from Paris to New York.

It also included correspondences with General Billy Mitchell, the father of the United States Air Force, and Nikolaus Basenach, partner of Major general Hans Georg Friedrich Groß, the first builders of German military airships.

Stanley Yale Beach married September 15, 1897, in Mount Vernon, New York, to Helen Curtiss, daughter of Alfred Curtiss. They had 3 children together : Frederick Converse Jr., Alfred Birdseye and Margaret Stanley Beach.

Beach Jr. was Editor of the Boston University Law Review, Deputy Judge of Stratford Town Court, and Prosecuting Attorney with a law business.

He was also a Freemason of the American Legion, and served in the Ambulance Company, Field Hospital, during World War I

Beach died July 13, 1955, at the age of 78 in New York. His father Frederick C. Beach had given him a trust fund of $500,000 in 1914; about 350 million dollars in 2024 money in relation to GDP, and was the owner and secretary-treasurer of Scientific American at the time.

Beach's great-grandfather, Moses Yale Beach, had a fortune of about $300,000 in 1846, or about 3.7 billion dollars in relation to GDP, and was among the wealthiest citizens of New York.

== Gallery ==
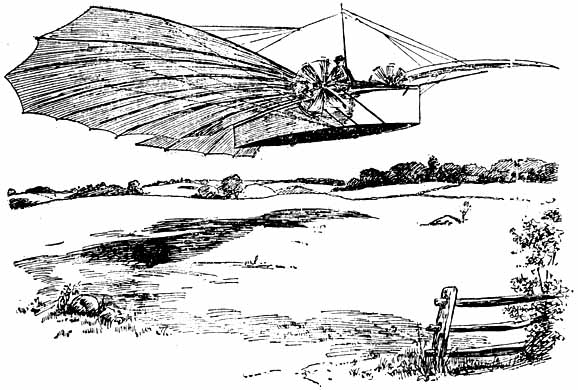
Gustave Whitehead's monoplane. Historical consensus is that it never flew.

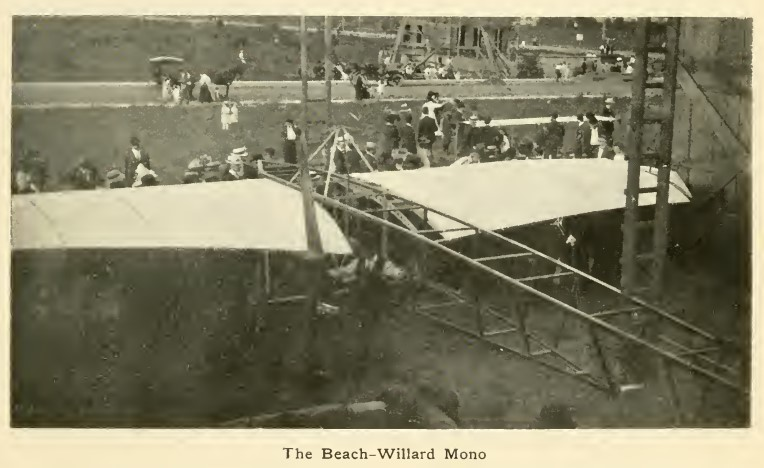
Beach-Willard Mono with Charles F. Willard

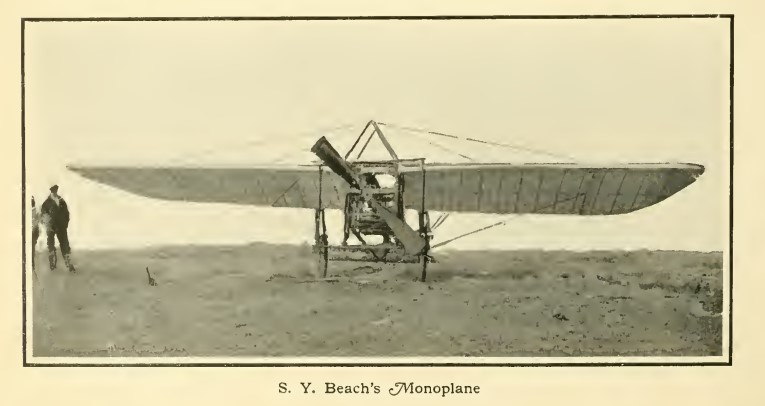
Stanley Yale Beach's monoplane

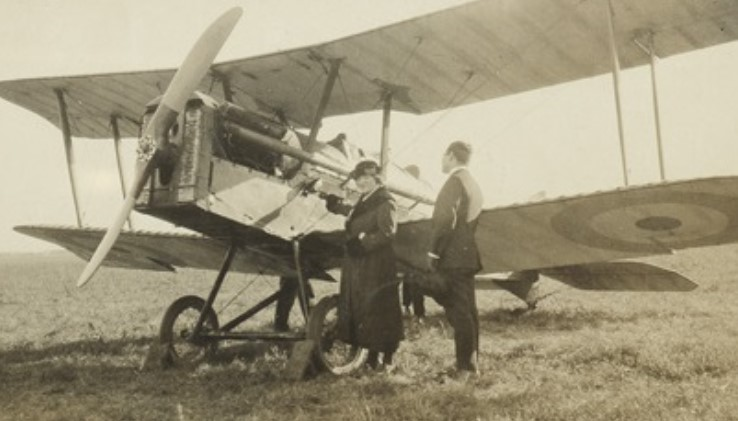
Stanley Yale on the right
