= Moses S. Beach =

American newspaper editor and politician

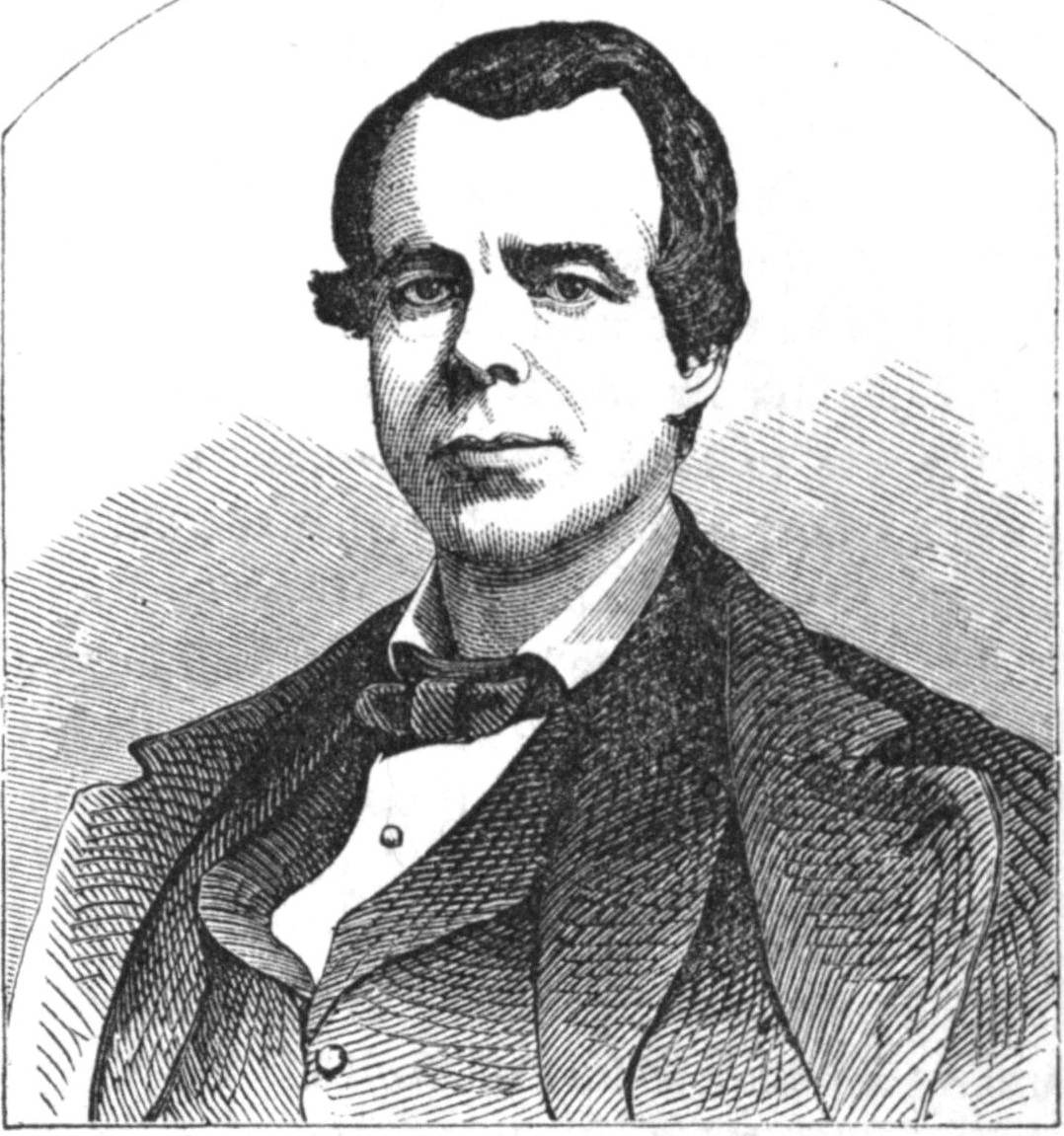
Moses Sperry Beach portrait, picture from the book The Innocents Abroad

Moses Sperry Beach (October 5, 1822 – July 25, 1892) was an American newspaper owner, editor, inventor, and politician from New York. His papers were the Boston Daily Times and the New York Sun. He ran the Sun through most of the American Civil War, and was active during the presidency of Abraham Lincoln.

He was featured in Mark Twain's book The Innocents Abroad, after embarking on the Quaker City to visit Europe and the Holy Land. He was also a great friend of abolitionist pastor Henry Ward Beecher, and was a trustee Plymouth Church, which was at the forefront of the anti-slavery movement at the time.

== Life ==
Beach was born on October 5, 1822, in Springfield, Massachusetts. He was the son of Moses Yale Beach, proprietor of The Sun, and Nancy Day. His brother was Alfred Ely Beach, the first subway-constructor in New York, and proprietor of Scientific American, while his uncle was Benjamin Day, founder of the New York Sun. Another brother was banker William Yale Beach. His paternal grandmother was descended from the Yale family that founded Yale College, and his maternal grandmother was descended from Pilgrim William Brewster.

His cousins were Frederick Converse Beach and Stanley Yale Beach, and his great-grandson was Brewster Yale Beach. Beach attended Monson Academy, where he was taught by his uncle Rev. Alfred Ely. He left the school after several years due to his failing eyesight. In 1840, he spent a year in France learning French at an institution near Paris. He worked with his father in The Sun until 1845, when he bought half of the Boston Daily Times.

In October 1845, Beach and his brother Alfred joined their father in a partnership of The Sun. In 1848, the brothers bought out their father and took control of the newspaper. Moses Yale Beach organized a dinner before retiring. The guests included other members of the news industry such as Congressman Horace Greeley, Congressman James Brooks, and Henry Jarvis Raymond, founder of the New York Times, and Chairman of the Republicans under Abraham Lincoln. Beach owned the Sun Building and other properties in New York.

== Career ==
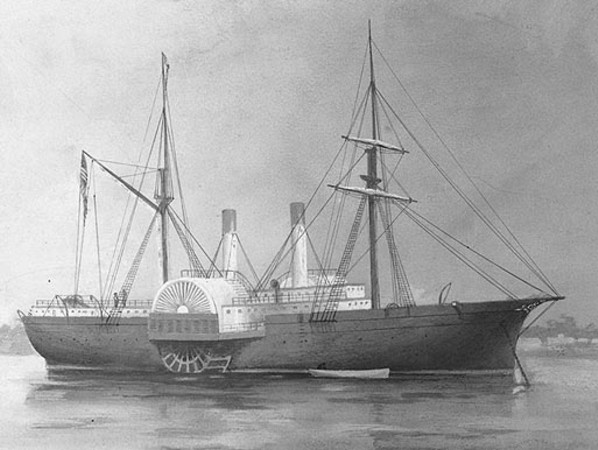
USS Quaker City, luxury cruise trip with Mark Twain to Europe and the Holy Land

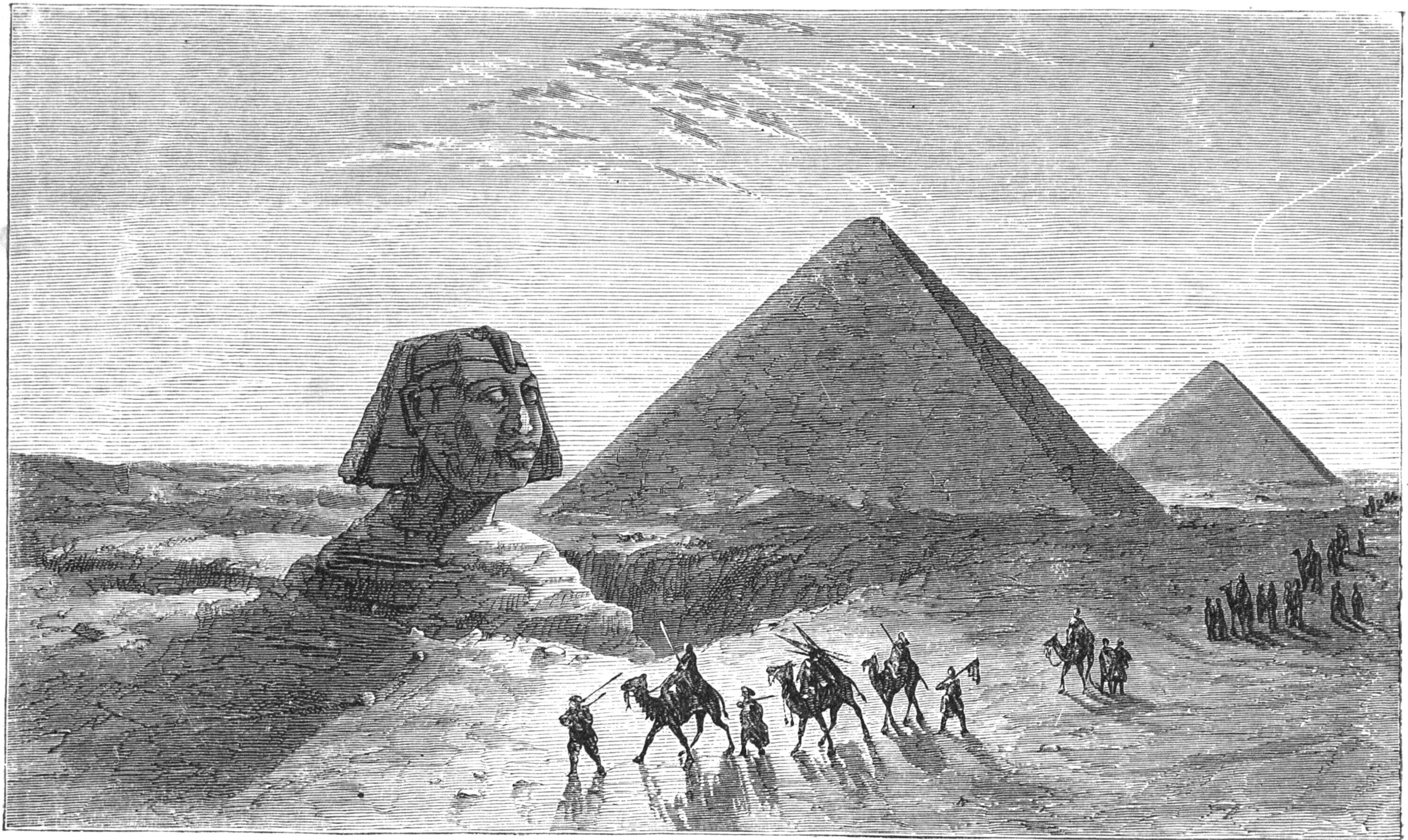
The Innocents Abroad, excursion to the Holy Land in 1867

In 1852, he became the sole proprietor, with a brief gap from 1860 to 1861 when he was ill, where William Conant Church published the paper instead. Under Moses Sperry Beach's leadership, the Sun supported Abraham Lincoln, and was described as an out-and-out loyalist. The paper covered his day of election as well as his assassination. They refused to join other newspapers in wild abuse of Lincoln and Johnson at the 1864 National Union National Convention, and gave support to Ulysses S. Grant as its candidate for the U.S. presidency, the General who led the Union Army to victory during the American Civil War in 1865.

The Sun : The reelection of Abraham Lincoln announces to the world how firmly we have resolved to be a free and united people.
--The entry in the Story of the Sun: New York, 1833-1918

By the end of the war, the Sun was read by half a million people, at a time when the city of New York had less than a million population. Beach owned the paper until 1868, when he sold it to Charles A. Dana, the past Assistant Secretary of War of Abraham Lincoln and Gen. Ulysses S. Grant. He also patented several inventions related to printing and stereotyping. These patents consisted of feeding the roil paper to the press instead of flat sheets, wetting the paper prior to printing, cutting off sheets after printing, and adapting newspaper presses to print both sides of the same sheet at the same time.

After the war, he and a group of travelers decided to visit Europe and the Holy Land. Before departure, he organized at his home a farewell Gala with Beecher, which was to be a five-month luxury tour organized by Captain Charles Duncan, the Shipping Commissioner of the Port of New York, and father in-law of Dr. Arthur Wells Yale. Mark Twain joined the group and they embarked on the USS Quaker City steamship to Europe in 1867, with Moses Sperry and other members making an appearance in Mark Twain's Innocents Abroad.

The luxurious cruise was the first organized tourism trip in American history. The itinerary included Gibraltar, Rome, Athens, Constantinople, Beirut, Jerusalem, Cairo, and other exotic places, including the 1867 Exposition Universelle in Paris, and a visit with Czar Alexander II and other members of the House of Romanov. His daughter Emma joined the voyage and became a friend of Mark Twain. She became his correspondent and Twain later stayed overnight at Moses Sperry's home in Brooklyn, New York.

== Later life ==
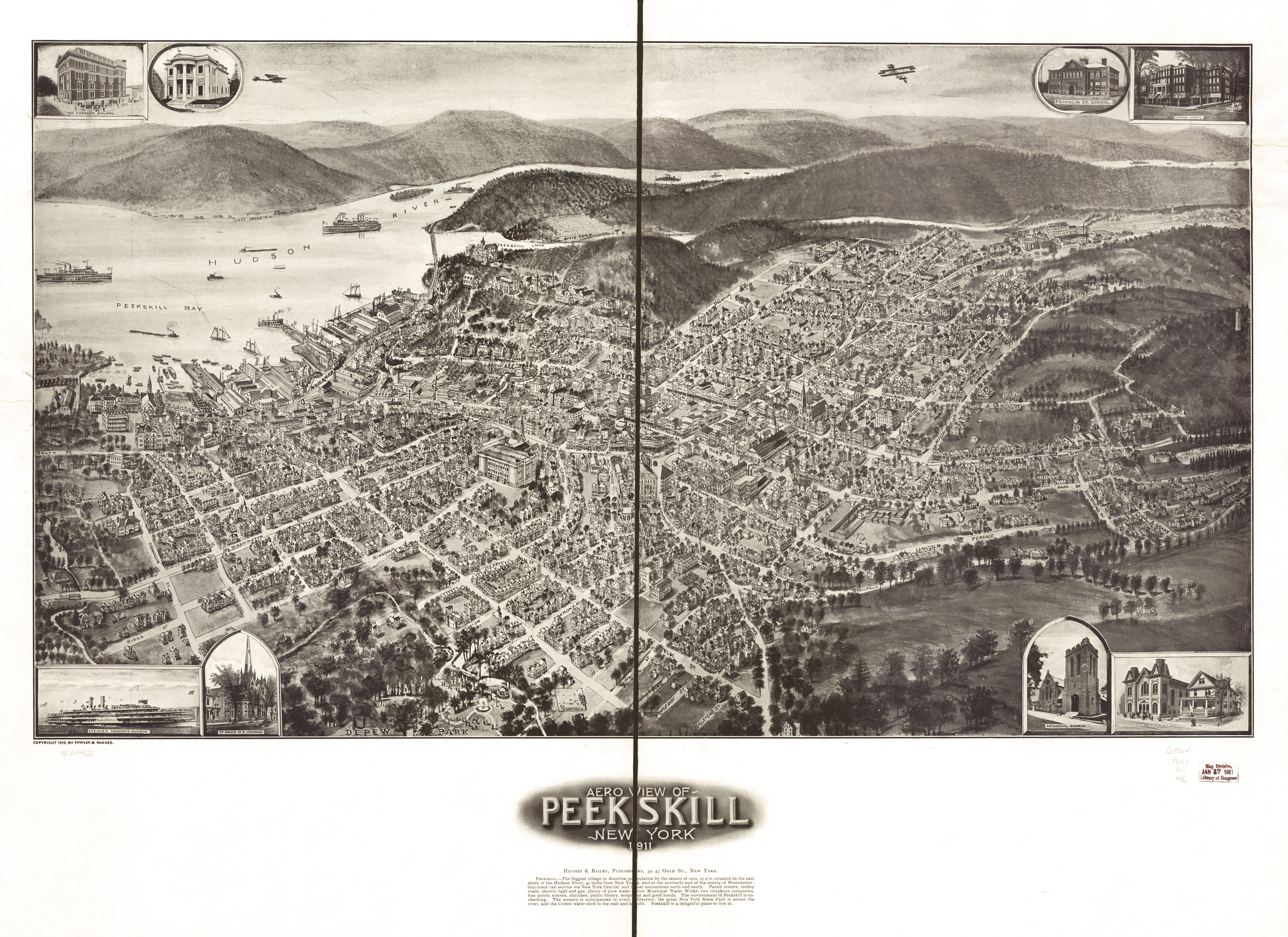
Aerial view of Peekskill, New York, historic city of the Civil War featuring the Underground Railroad

Beach lived in Columbia Heights, Brooklyn, from 1851 to 1888, at which point he retired to Peekskill, New York. He served in the New York State Assembly as a Democrat, representing Kings County 2nd District, in 1858. He became a board director of the Brooklyn Fire Insurance Company on Court Street, next to Brooklyn Borough Hall.

In 1845, Beach married Chloe Buckingham. They had two sons and three daughters, including artist Emma Beach Thayer, who married to naturalist Abbott Handerson Thayer, a pioneer of military camouflage and member of the Thayer family. His son Charles Yale Beach was a manufacturer and real estate investor, with holdings in New Haven and Bridgeport, and was a correspondent of Mark Twain. He was also a student in philosophy at Yale, and supported Elihu Root's investigation of Captain Duncan.

Beach was treasurer of the Working Woman's Protective Union for the first 30 years of its existence. He was a deacon and trustee of Plymouth Church, which was at the forefront of the anti-slavery movement during the mid-19th century. He was also superintendent of its Sunday school, and a close friend of its pastor, Henry Ward Beecher, an ardent abolitionist. The Beecher family were great friends of the Beaches, being neighbors in Brooklyn, and are featured in the Pulitzer book The Most Famous Man in America.

The families were also living next to each other at Peekskill, New York, as Beach followed his friend Henry Beecher and bought land next to his farm on the Beecher-McFadden Estate. Their homes were also used as Underground Railroad safe houses to host in secret tunnels the slaves who were on their way to Canada, in disobedience to the Fugitive Slave Law. Visitors of Beecher in Peekskill included his sister Harriet, abolitionist and author of "Uncle Tom's Cabin". Beach's brother, Alfred Ely Beach, founded the first school for freed slaves in Savannah, Georgia, named the Beach Institute, after the victory of General Sherman, who gave the region to Lincoln after the Civil War.

Beach was also a correspondent of P.T. Barnum, Kan'ichi Asakawa, Edward Beecher, John Ericsson, Cyrus W. Field, Edward Everett Hale, Christopher Grant La Farge, Harriet Beecher Stowe, and Robert E. Bonner, a racehorse competitor of Commodore Vanderbilt. He died at home of a stroke on July 25, 1892. He was buried at Cortlandt Manor, Hillside Cemetery, New York, part of the ancestral estate of Van Cortlandt Manor of the Van Cortlandt family.

New York State Assembly
Preceded by Thomas Mulligan	New York State Assembly; Kings County, 2nd District; 1858	Succeeded by Marquis D. Moore
