= Frederick Converse Beach =

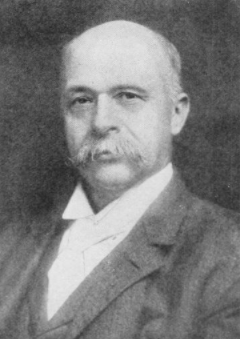
- Born: March 27, 1848; New York City, New York, US
- Died: June 8, 1918 (aged 70); Stratford, Connecticut, US
- Education: Yale University
- Known for: Co-owner of scientific American
- Children: Stanley Yale Beach
- Parent(s): Alfred Ely Beach, Harriet Holbrook
- Relatives: Moses Yale Beach, grandfather Moses S. Beach, uncle William Yale Beach, uncle Brewster Yale Beach, cousin
- Family: Yale

Frederick Converse Beach (March 27, 1848 – June 8, 1918), was a New York patent attorney, editor and co-owner of Scientific American, and editor-in-chief of the new Encyclopedia Americana in the early 1900s. He became President of the oldest operating yacht club in Connecticut. He was also the father of Stanley Yale Beach, an aviation pioneer and early financier of Gustav Whitehead.

== Biography ==
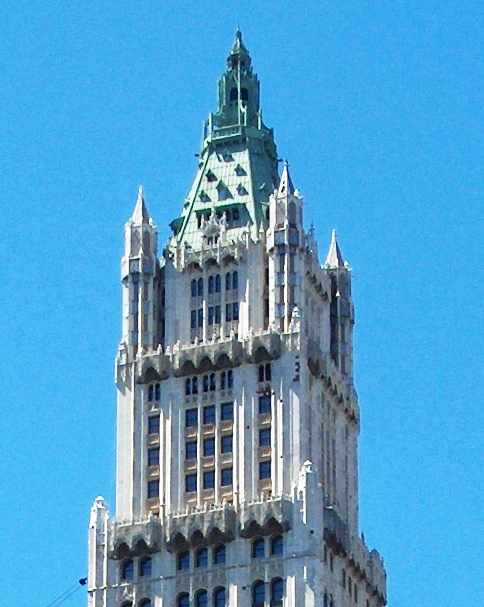
Woolworth Building, 1915, seat of Scientific American offices

Frederick Converse Beach was born on March 27, 1848, in Brooklyn, New York, to Alfred Ely Beach, builder of New York's first subway. His grandfather was Moses Yale Beach, publisher of the New York Sun, and his uncle was Moses Sperry Beach, publisher of the Boston Daily Times. His other uncle William Yale Beach was a banker and real estate developer, and his cousin Charles Yale Beach was a manufacturer and real estate investor. Frederick's son was Stanley Yale Beach, an aviation pioneer, and the Beaches were all members of the Yale family.

Frederick Converse Beach graduated from Yale's Sheffield Scientific School in 1868. In 1869, he was made night superintendent of the Beach Pneumatic Transit tunnel under Broadway, and then in 1870, operated a pneumatic car and explained its working to the public.

From 1871 to 1876, he was engaged in the manufacture of electrical instruments in New York, making telegraphs. He later became editor for Scientific American, their family magazine, and became one of its co-owners. He was also co-owner of Munn and Company, a family owned patent agency, and American Photography magazine.

After working on improving the telephone technology, he became the first, in 1880, to transmit sermons over the telephone, communicating from Plymouth Church (Brooklyn), to his father's house at 31 Union Place, in front of Union Square, New York. In 1884, he founded the Society of Amateur Photographers of New York, becoming its first President, and joined the Postal Progress League and became also its President.

He secured a parcel post for the United States, brought many reforms, and looked forward to the time when aerial transport of all kinds of mail will happen by the atmosphere. He was a member of the New York Electrical Society, the Camera Club, the American Institute, and the National Arts Club in Manhattan, with members including J. P. Morgan and President Theodore Roosevelt. He was made President of the Housatonic Yacht Club, the oldest operating Yacht club in Connecticut. The club was founded by his family on his father's property in Stratford, Connecticut.

In 1889 he was the editor of American Photography, and in 1896 he became a director of Scientific American. In 1898, he introduced the first electric automobile in Stratford, Connecticut, and built a power plant for its maintenance. From 1902 he was editor in chief of the Encyclopedia Americana, which was the first major multivolume encyclopedia published in the United States.

Frederick also funded, in thousands of dollars, the airplane designs of his son Stanley from 1903–1910.

He died on June 8, 1918, at his home in Stratford, Connecticut.

== Family legacy ==
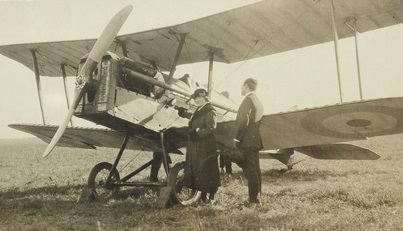
Stanley Yale Beach, aviation pioneer, son of Frederick C. Beach

Frederick Converse Beach was the father of Alfred Gilbert, Ethel Holbrook, who married to caricaturist James Albert Wales, and Stanley Yale Beach, a wealthy aviation pioneer, partner of Gustave Whitehead. Frederick's grandson was Frederick Converse Beach Jr.

He graduated from Trinity College, and became editor of the Boston University Law Review, Deputy Judge of Stratford Town Court, and Prosecuting Attorney with his law practice.

He also served during the World War in the Ambulance Company, Field Hospital, and Medical Attachment, and was a Freemason of the American Legion and a member of the Housatonic Yacht Club. His father was Stanley Yale Beach.
