= Tunnelling shield =

Protective structure used during the excavation of tunnels

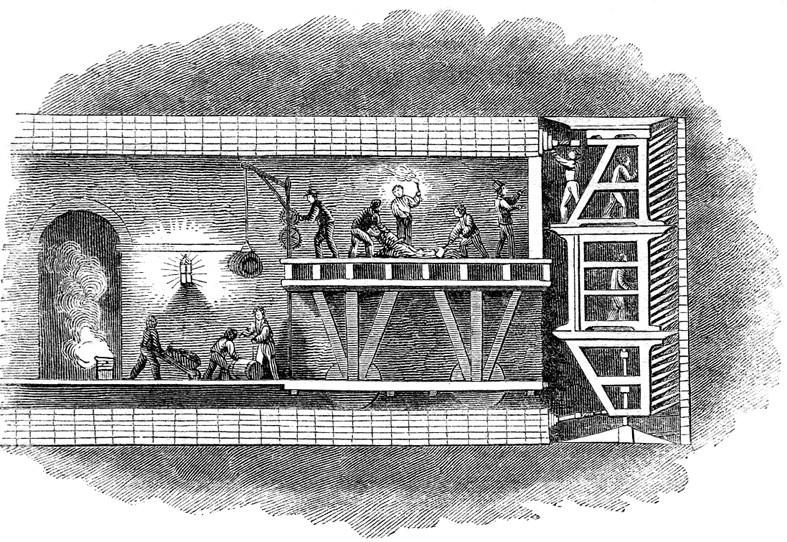
Side view of the tunnelling shield (far right) used to construct the Thames Tunnel; the permanent brick supporting structure is built immediately behind it.

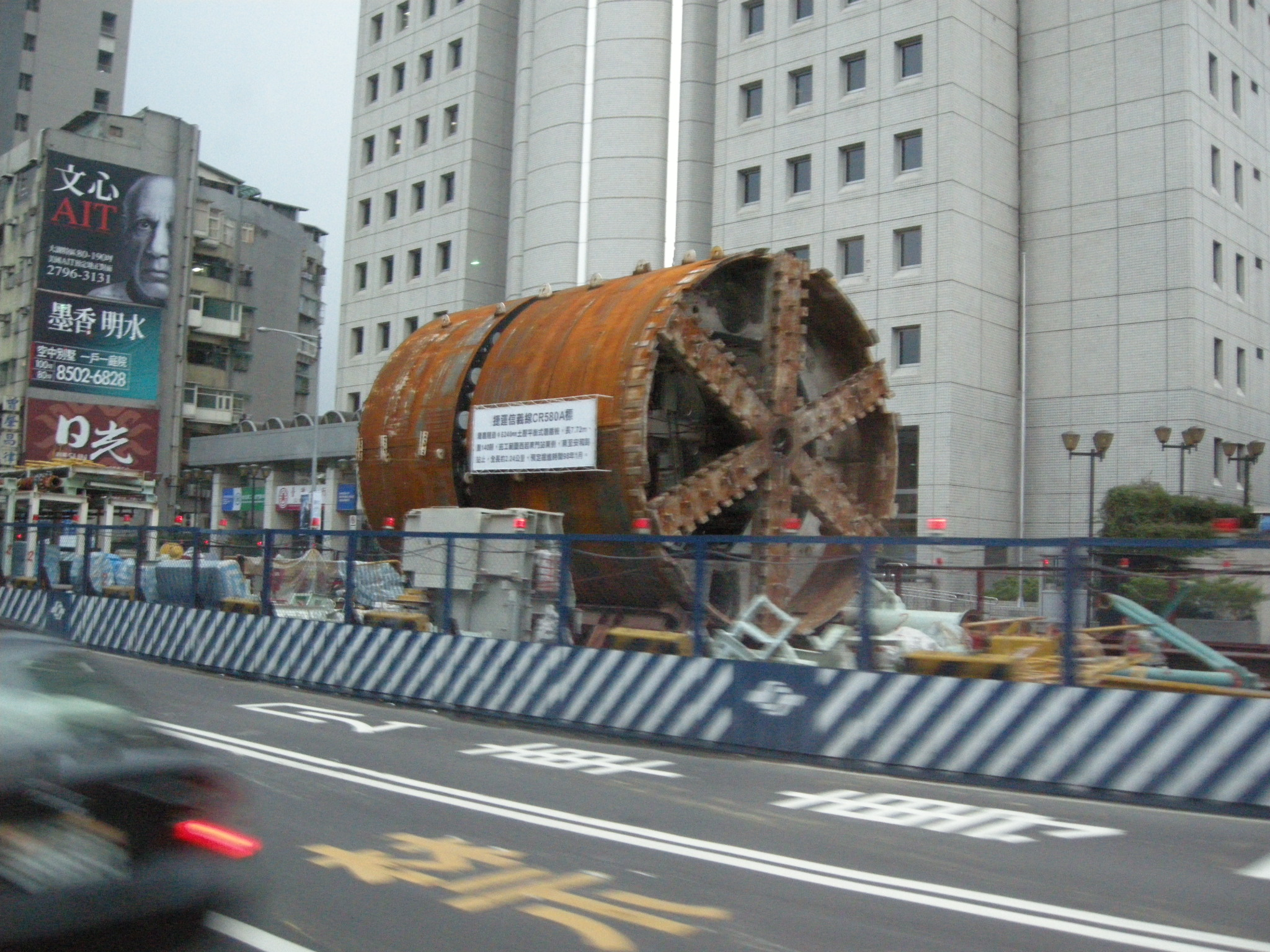
The tunnelling shield used for the construction of the Xinyi Line on the Taipei Metro system in Taiwan.

A tunnelling shield is a protective structure used during the excavation of large, human-made tunnels. When excavating through ground that is soft, liquid, or otherwise unstable, there is a potential health and safety hazard to workers and the project itself from falling materials or a cave-in. A tunnelling shield can be used as a temporary support structure. It is usually in place for the short term from when the tunnel section is excavated until it can be lined with a permanent support structure. The permanent structure may be made up of bricks, concrete, cast iron, or steel, depending on the period. Although modern shields are commonly cylindrical, the first "shield", designed by Marc Isambard Brunel, was actually a large, rectangular, scaffold-like iron structure with three levels and twelve sections per level, with a solid load-bearing top surface. The structure protected the men from cave-ins as they laboured within it, digging the tunnel out in front of the shield.

== History ==
The first successful rectangular tunnelling shield was developed by Marc Isambard Brunel and patented with Lord Cochrane in January 1818. Brunel and his son Isambard Kingdom Brunel used it to excavate the Thames Tunnel beginning in 1825 (though the tunnel was not opened until 1843). Brunel is said to have been inspired in his design by the shell of the shipworm, a mollusc whose efficiency at boring through submerged timber he observed while working in a shipyard. The shield was built by Maudslay, Sons & Field of Lambeth, London, who also built the steam pumps for de-watering the tunnel.

This shield was made of cast-iron and was moved by jackscrews. Shelves supported the different sides until more permanent brick linings could be installed. Its dimensions were 22 ft 3 in by 37 ft 6 in. Despite its success, the enormous cost and problems faced rendered another attempt of his method a daunting task not attempted for another quarter century.

In 1840, Alfred Ely Beach, editor of Scientific American journal, was the first to suggest a circular design would be superior to Brunel's rectangular design. In 1869 Beach built a circular shield - a picture of which was printed in a New York news article about his pneumatic tunnel system idea. The design was based upon Brunel's shield lattice and screw-jacked forwards as the face advanced manually.

In 1864 Peter W. Barlow applied for a design patent that had a circular cross-section. Theoretically this made the shield easier to build and better able to support surrounding soil; theoretically, because no shield was ever built using this design. The 1864 Barlow patent was further improved and given a provisional patent in 1868 but never ratified as Barlow died shortly afterwards.

Brunel's original design was substantially improved by James Henry Greathead who was granted three patents for different shield designs. Additionally, he invented the concept of sprayed concrete grout to stabilise earthworks with injected concrete, a gritting pan that hydraulically injected reinforcing grout into the cavities between the constructed lining and the circular tunnel wall.

Greathead was the first to use a cylindrical tunnelling shield, in the construction of the Tower Subway under the River Thames in central London in 1869. The Greathead shield was 7 feet 3 inches (2.21 m) in diameter. Similarly, Alfred Ely Beach opened his tunnel to the public on March 1, 1870.

Greathead also used one in the construction of the City and South London Railway (today part of London Underground's Northern line) in 1884, with tunnels 10 feet 2 inches (3.1 m) in diameter. His shield was also used in the driving of the 12 foot 1 3/4 inches (3.7 m) diameter running tunnels for the Waterloo & City Railway which opened in 1898. The station tunnels at the City station (now known as Bank) was the largest diameter tunnelling shield in the world at the time, measuring 23 feet (7.0 m).

An original Greathead shield used in the excavation of the deep London Underground lines remains in place in disused tunnels beneath Moorgate station.

Most tunnelling shields are still loosely based on Greathead's design.

== Manual shield tunnelling ==
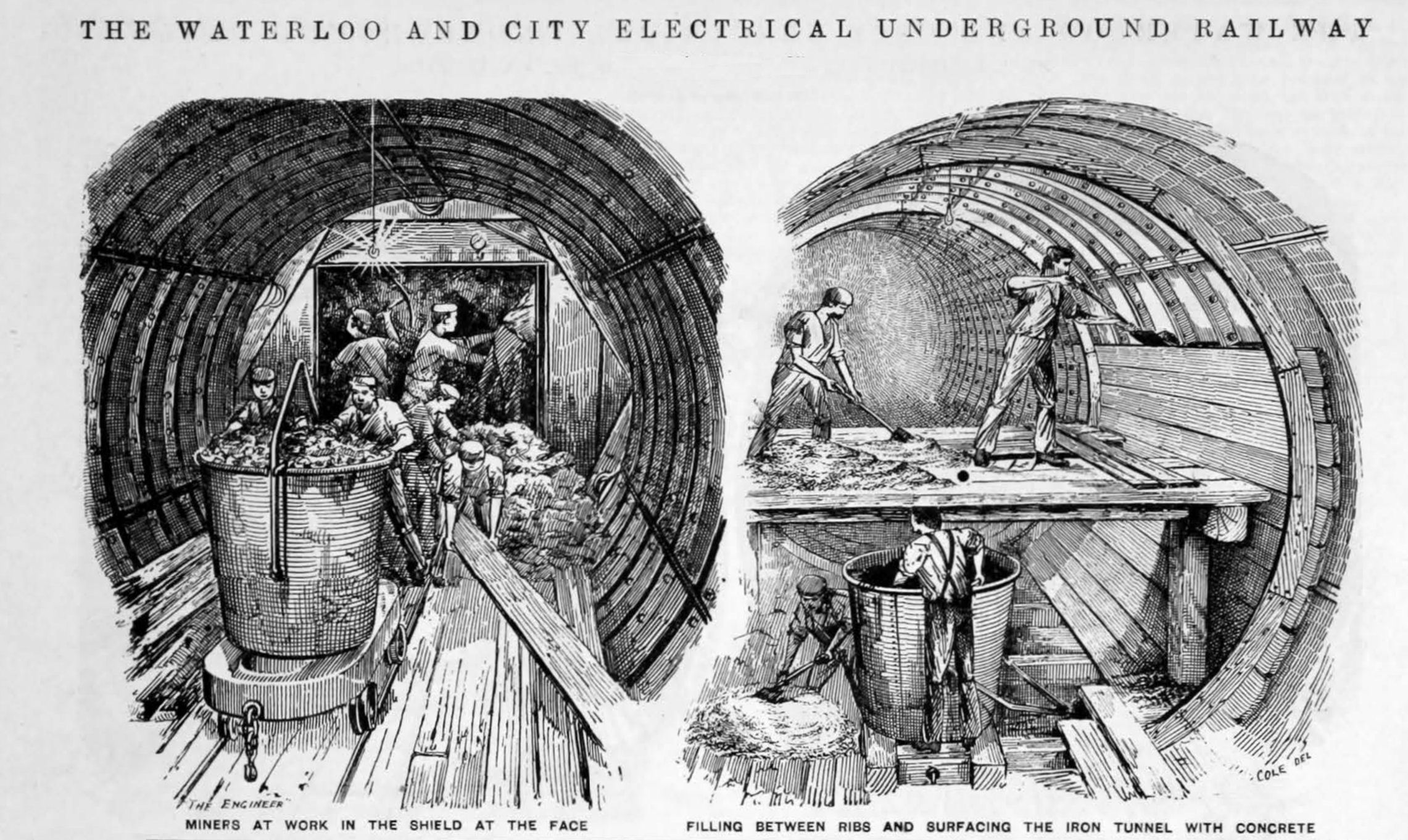
The Greathead tunnelling shield in use on the Waterloo & City Railway

In early shield tunnelling, the shield functioned as a way to protect labourers who performed the digging and moved the shield forward, progressively replacing it with pre-built sections of tunnel wall. The early deep tunnels for the London Underground were built in this way. The shield divided the workface into overlapping portions that each worker could excavate.

== Modern tunnel boring machines ==
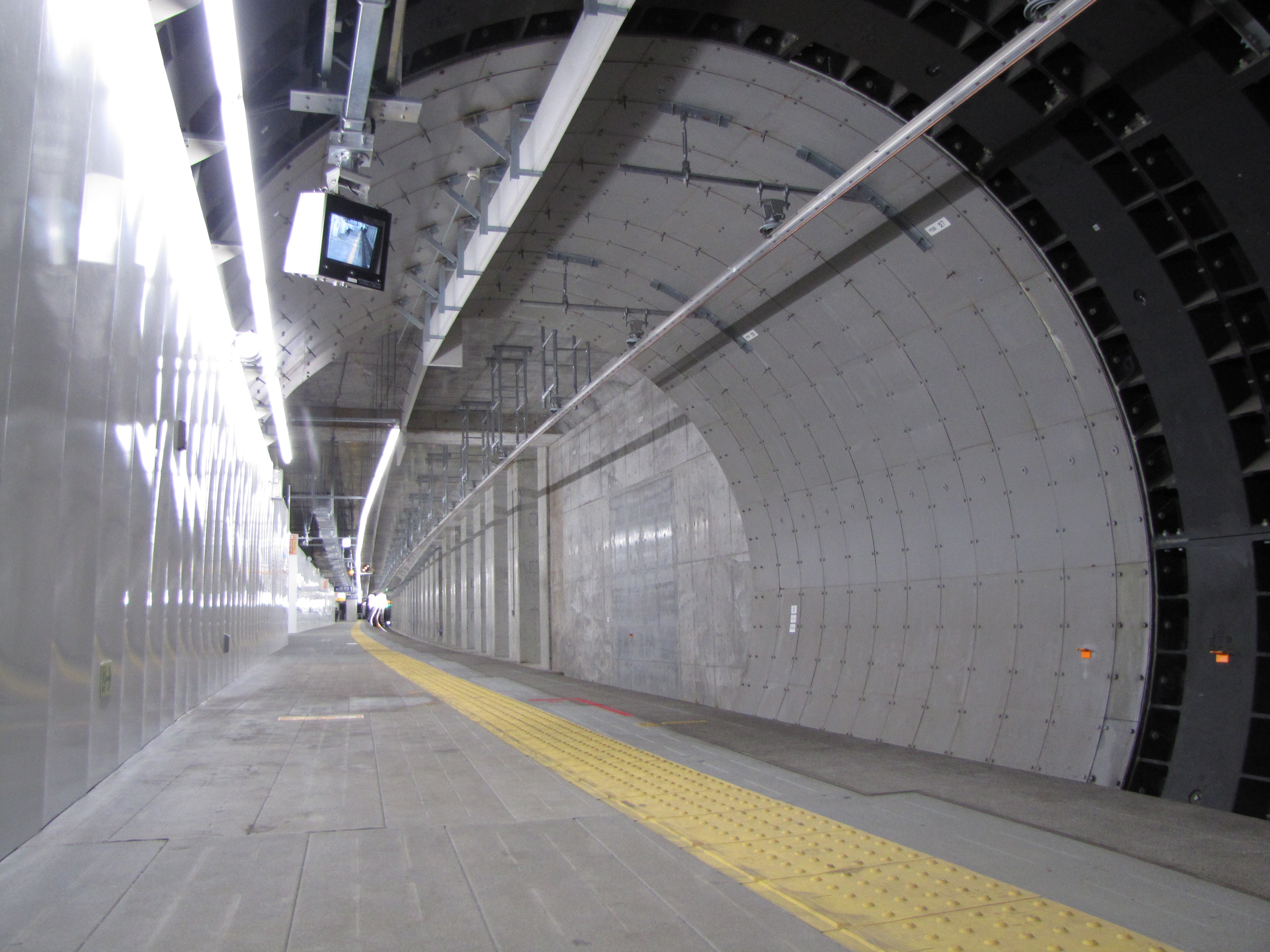
Tunnel boring machine case left in the completed tunnel and used as part of the support structure at Setagaya-Daita Station on the Odakyu Odawara Line

A tunnel boring machine (TBM) consists of a shield (a large metal cylinder) and trailing support mechanisms.

A rotating cutting wheel is located at the front end of the shield. Behind the cutting wheel there is a chamber where the excavated soil is either mixed with slurry (so-called slurry TBM) or left as-is (earth pressure balance or EPB shield), depending on the type of the TBM. The choice of TBM type depends on the soil conditions. Systems are also present for removal of the soil (or the soil mixed with slurry).

Behind the chamber there is a set of hydraulic jacks supported by the finished part of the tunnel which are used to push the TBM forward. Once a certain distance has been excavated (roughly 1.5–2 meters (5–7 ft)), a new tunnel ring is built using the erector. The erector is a rotating system which picks up precast concrete segments and places them in the desired position.

Several support mechanisms can be found behind the shield, inside the finished part of the tunnel, which are part of the TBM: dirt removal, slurry pipelines if applicable, control rooms, rails for transport of the precast segments, etc.

== Lining ==
The tunnel lining is the wall of the tunnel. It usually consists of precast concrete segments which form rings. Cast iron linings were traditionally used in the London Underground tunnels, while steel liners were sometimes used elsewhere. The concept of using precast moulded lining sections is not new and was first patented in 1874 by James Henry Greathead.

== Shields in Japan ==
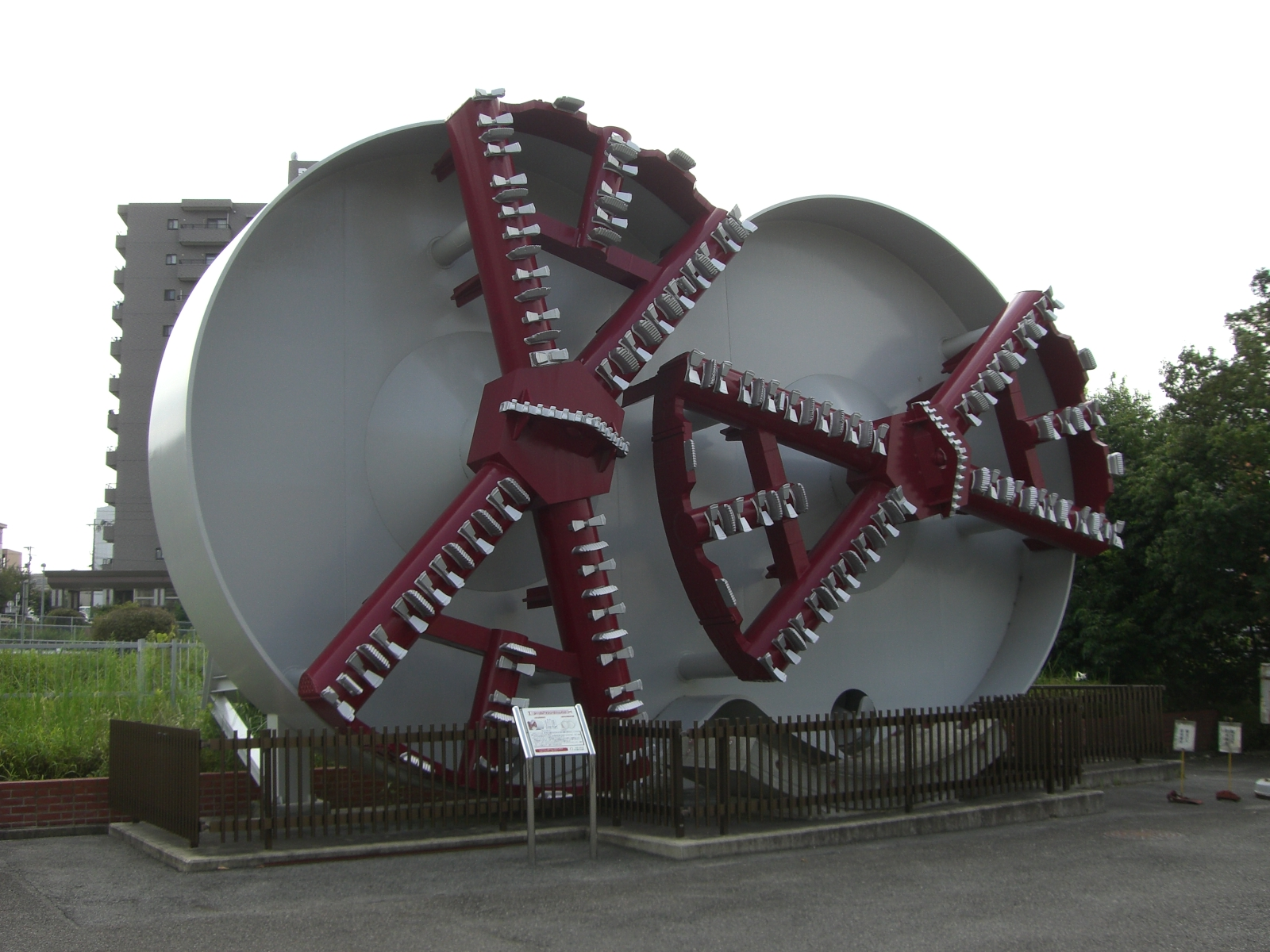
Tunnel boring machine to excavate a Double-O-Tube

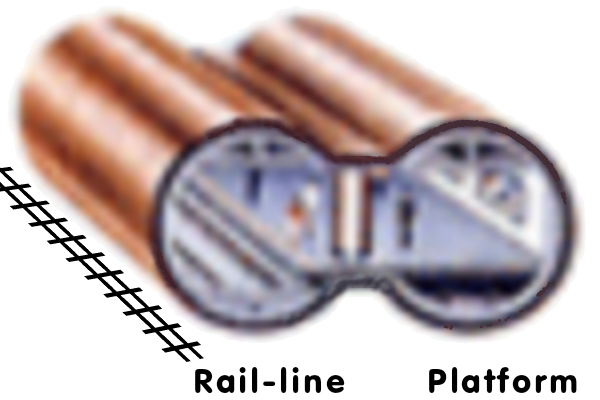
Double-O tube tunnel example

In Japan there are several innovative approaches to shield tunnelling, e.g. the Double-O-Tube or DOT-tunnel. This tunnel looks like two overlapping circles. There are also shields with computerized arms which can be used to dig a tunnel in virtually any shape.

== See also ==
- Longwall mining, a coal-mining method using a series of hydraulic shields
