= The Boston Times =

Newspaper published in Boston, Massachusetts

The Boston Times, also known as the Boston Daily Times and Boston Sunday Times, was a newspaper published in Boston, Massachusetts from c. 1826–1933. At various periods in its history it operated as a daily newspaper and a weekly newspaper.

== History ==
Various sources give differing accounts over the origins of The Boston Times. Sources are in agreement that the paper was founded by editor George Roberts. University of Wisconsin historian and journalism educator Willard Grosvenor Bleyer wrote that this newspaper began publication in February 1836. Likewise, historian Alexander Saxton stated that The Boston Times, then known as Boston Daily Times, was "put into mass circulation in 1836". However, contemporary published accounts date the paper to at least ten years earlier and it is likely that the paper began publication sometime in 1826 or slightly earlier. An 1826 Boston publication stated that The Boston Times was already being published under editor George Roberts; describing the newspaper as the first penny press in the city of Boston and the first newspaper in Boston to use a Hoe press. This also mirrors historical accounts written by The Bostonian Society which indicate that the newspaper was publishing at this time out of a building on the south side of the Old State House.

By the late 1830s, the Boston Daily Times had reached a circulation of 20,000. In 1837 Roberts lost control of the paper to other investors, but by 1840 he had acquired enough capital to once again own a controlling share of the paper. In 1845 Moses S. Beach joined Roberts as a managing partner of the paper. In 1850 Roberts appointed C. C. Hazewell managing editor of the paper. In 1872 the paper was purchased by a company owned by B. W. Thayer, R. C. Dunham, John M. Tuohy, J. O. Hayden, and George Williamson.

Frank T. Robinson was managing editor of The Boston Times from 1879 to 1883. Hiram Irving Dillenback became assistant editor of the paper in October 1882. Dillenback and the paper's business manager, Edward C. Davis, purchased the paper in January 1883 at which point Dillenback became managing editor of the paper.

In 1885 the paper was purchased by D.S. Knowlton at which point it was published with Knowlton as managing editor as a weekly newspaper known as the Boston Sunday Times. In 1898 the paper was purchased by Elmer C. Rice who became managing-editor. In 1903 Francis [Frank] A. Russegue, a longtime employee of The Boston Times, became managing editor of the paper; a position he maintained until his death in March 1915. J. W. Denehy Jr. succeed Russegue as editor of the paper; a position he maintained until the paper ceased publication in 1933. The newspaper archives have been preserved by the Library of Congress at https://www.loc.gov/item/sn91058061.

An unrelated newspaper with the same name was established ca. 2021, although its own website claims without evidence, that the paper was re-created in 1972. Subsequently, Boston Times became a platform for disseminating conspiracy theories by John Mark Dougan as well as by Russian disinformation campaigns.
