= Roger Burlingame =

American author

William Roger Burlingame (May 7, 1889 – 1967) was a prolific author, writer, and biographer. Burlingame served as the book editor at Scribner's Magazine (1914–1926). After leaving his job at Scribner's, Burlingame authored 25 books, including biographies and works of historical non-fiction. He also wrote for The New York Times Magazine and The New York Times Book Review.

== Early life, education, and career launch ==
Burlingame was born in Manhattan in 1889. He graduated from Morristown School in Morristown, NJ (now Morristown-Beard School) in 1909. Burlingame then received his bachelor's degree from Harvard University in 1913. During his years at Harvard, Burlingame served as an editor of The Harvard Lampoon, a humor magazine. He was a classmate of writer John P. Marquand from Newburyport, Massachusetts, who also worked on The Lampoon.

After graduating from Harvard, Burlingame worked on the staff of The Independent, a weekly magazine published in New York City, for a year. He then joined the staff of Scribner's. Burlingame led Scribner's to sign Marquand and publish his first novel, An Unspeakable Gentleman.

== Non-fiction writing ==
Burlingame's books discussed science, war, and industrial growth in the US. His biographies examined the life stories of Benjamin Franklin, Henry Ford, Alexander Graham Bell, General Billy Mitchell, journalist Elmer Davis, and cotton gin inventor Eli Whitney. Burlingame's historical works also discussed mass production and the creation of the Panama Canal.

While authoring books, Burlingame taught at Barnard College in Manhattan and Massachusetts Institute of Technology in Cambridge, Massachusetts. He taught courses at Barnard College that examined American literary contributions to national characteristics and ideas.

== Military service ==
Burlingame served with the American Expeditionary Forces in France during World War I. After completing officers' training in Plattsburgh, New York in 1917, he served as a lieutenant with the 308th Machine Gun Battalion of the 78th Infantry Division. The army detailed him to the American Students' Detachment at the University of Paris in 1919. During his deployment in France, Burlingame participated in the Meuse-Argonne Offensive, one of the last battles of the war.

== Family ==
Burlingame married Angeline Davis on September 28, 1933. Known professionally as Ann Watkins, she worked as a literary agent and play broker. Burlingame's father, Edward Livermore Burlingame, served as the editor of Scribner's Magazine from 1887 to 1914. He then served as general editorial adviser to Scribner and Son's. Burlingame's grandfather, Anson Burlingame, helped organize the Republican Party's first operations in Massachusetts. He served as a member of the U.S. House of Representatives representing Massachusetts's 5th congressional district and then as the U.S. Minister to China.

== Legacy ==
A special collection at Syracuse University in Syracuse, New York houses papers from three generations of the Burlingame family. Most of the writings in this collection come from Roger Burlingame. The writings include his manuscripts, published articles, diaries, poems, short stories, and speeches.

== Published works ==
- You Too (1924)
- Susan Shane: A Story of Success (1926)
- High Thursday (1928)
- The Heir (1930)
- Peace Veterans; The Story of a Racket, and a Plea for Economy (1932)
- Cartwheels (1935)
- Three Bags Full: A Novel of New York State (1936)
- March of the Iron Men: A Social History of Union through Invention (1938)
- Engines of Democracy: Inventions and Society in Mature America (1940)
- Whittling Boy: The Story of Eli Whitney (1941)
- Victory without Peace (1944) (with Alden Stevens)
- Of Making Many Books: A Hundred years of Reading, Writing and Publishing (1946)
- Inventors Behind the Inventor (1947)
- Backgrounds of Power: The Human Story of Mass Production (1949)
- Mosquitoes in the Big Ditch: The Story of the Panama Canal (1952)
- Machines that Built America (1953)
- Henry Ford: A Great Life in Brief (1954)
- General Billy Mitchell: Champion of Air Defense (1956)
- The American Conscience (1957)
- Benjamin Franklin: The First Mr. American (1959)
- Men and Machines (1959)
- Endless Frontiers: The Story of McGraw-Hill (1959)
- I Have Known Many Worlds (1959)
- Scientists Behind the Inventors (1960)
- Don't Let Them Scare You: The Life and Times of Elmer Davis (1961)
- The Sixth Column (1962)
- Out of Silence Into Sound: The Life of Alexander Graham Bell (1964)
- Dictator Clock: 5,000 Years of Telling Time (1966)
- Benjamin Franklin, Envoy Extraordinary: The Secret Missions and Open Pleasures of Benjamin Franklin in London and Paris (1967)
