= Jules Guérin (artist) =

American painter (1866–1946)

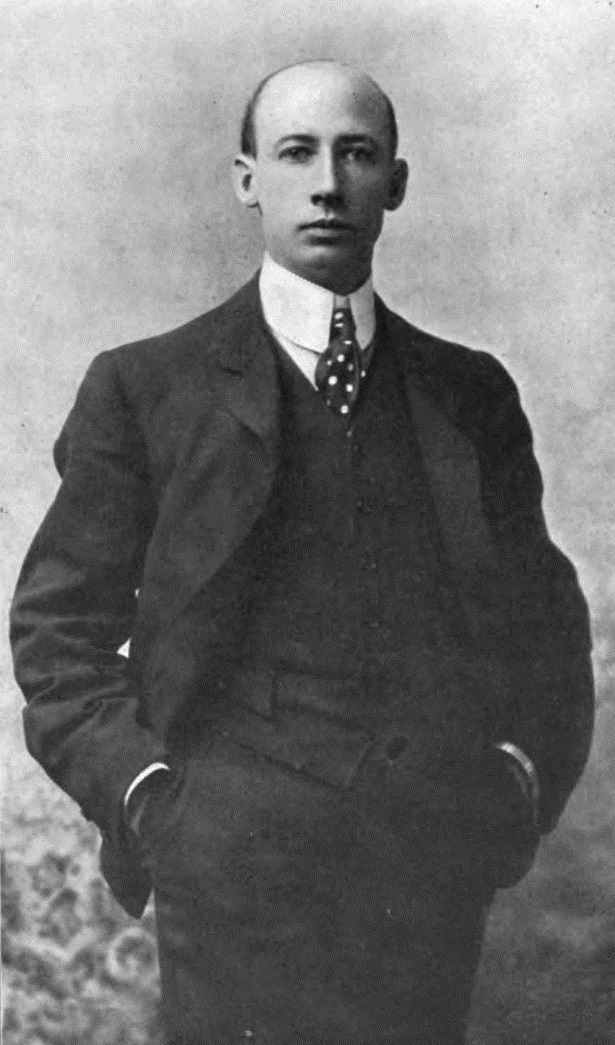
- Portrait of Jules Guérin, circa 1898
- Born: Jules Vallée Guérin; 18 November 1866; St Louis, Missouri, U.S.
- Died: 14 June 1946 (aged 79)
- Education: School of the Art Institute of Chicago
- Known for: Muralist, architectural drawing and illustration
- Movement: Orientalist

Jules Guérin (November 18, 1866 – June 14, 1946) was an American muralist, architectural delineator, and illustrator. A painter and widely published magazine illustrator, he gained prominence for his architectural work such as in the 1906, Plan for Chicago, and for the large murals he painted in many well-known public structures such as the Lincoln Memorial.

== Biography ==
Jules Vallée Guérin was born in St Louis, Missouri on November 18, 1866 and his family moved to Chicago in 1880. As a teenager, he was employed as a painter in a Chicago theatrical scenery firm. By 1889 he is known to have shared a studio with Winsor McCay, the noted cartoonist. They influenced each other in their use of daring points of view. In 1893 Guerin made a painting of one of the buildings at the Chicago World's Fair. His only confirmed art instruction occurred in Chicago, Jules attended evening life drawing classes for two years from 1892 to 1894 at The School of The Art Institute of Chicago, In 1896 he left Chicago to study in Paris. Though of French Huguenot descent, he is not likely to have spoken French fluently as a child. Nothing in his style or method indicates a Beaux Arts education.

In 1900 he established a studio in New York, where he made his name as an architectural delineator and illustrator. His first major break occurred when he was hired by Charles Follen McKim to create some illustrations for the Senate Parks Commission (McMillan Plan) for Washington. These were exhibited and published in 1902. Architects began hiring Guérin to make similar, dramatic renderings of their buildings. He worked mainly in watercolor, gouache, and tempera, usually on colored board. His fame as a colorist soon spread, and he took on more work as a magazine illustrator and sold lithographs. Guérin was a frequent contributor to Scribner's Magazine and Century Magazine during the first decade of the Twentieth Century.

As a result of his success in Washington, Daniel Burnham and Edward Bennett hired Guérin to make perspective illustrations for their monumental work, The Plan of Chicago in 1907. The spectacular color views of the proposed city, many from a bird's eye perspective, are his most famous works. The majority of these original renderings—by Guérin and other artists—are in the collection of the Department of Architecture at The Art Institute of Chicago, while others are currently owned by the Chicago Historical Society.

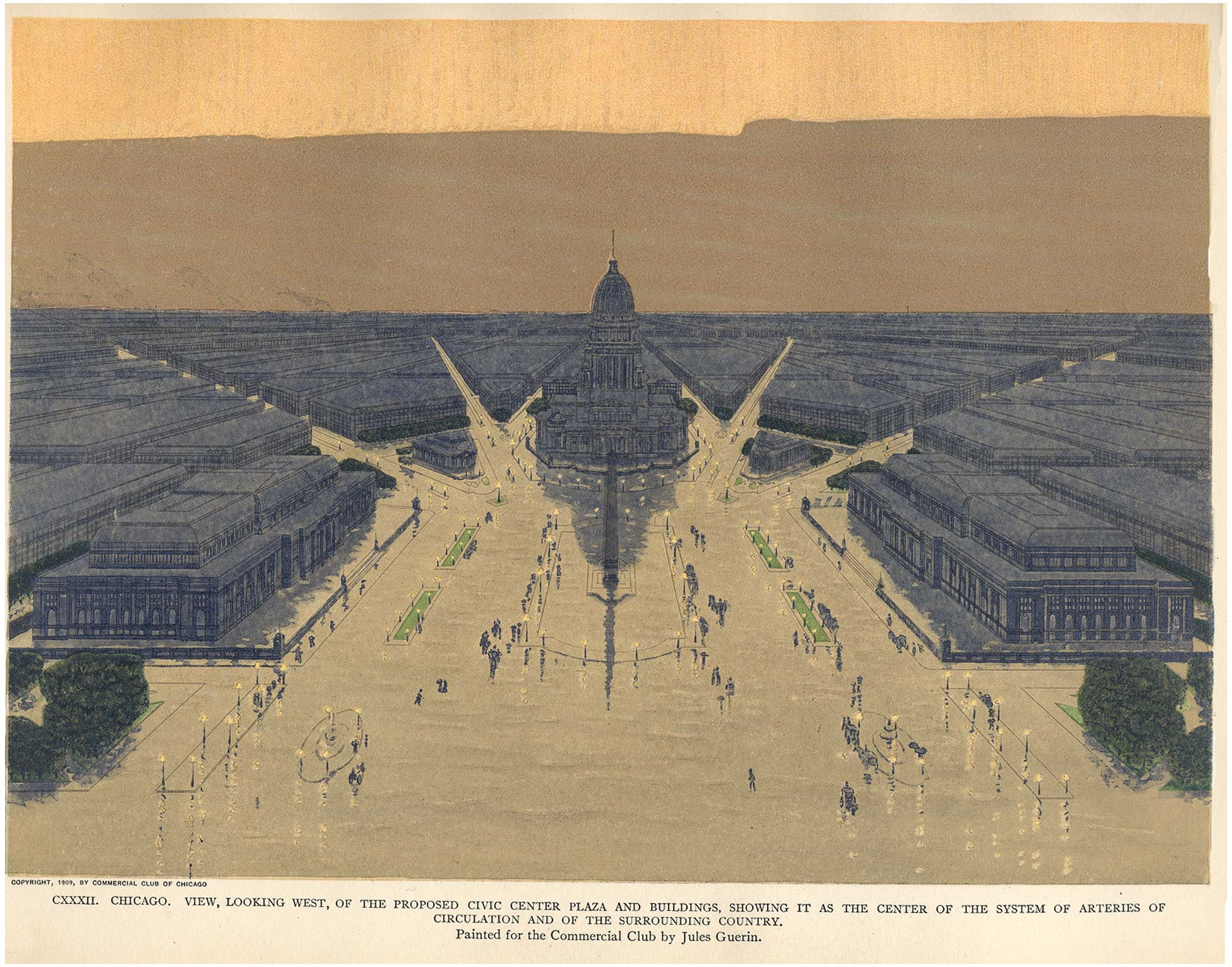
Painting by Guerin for Daniel Burnham's Plan of Chicago, 1909

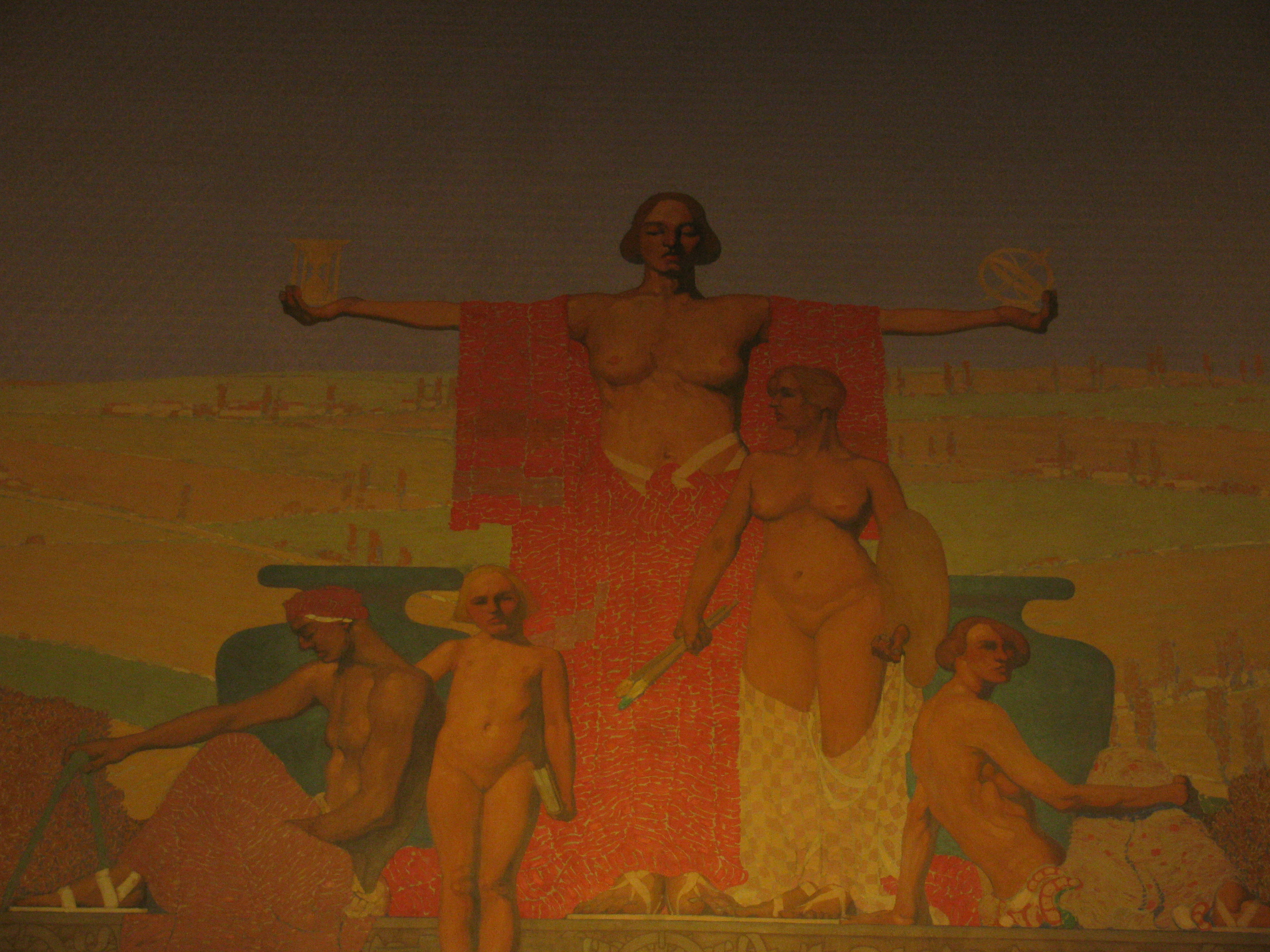
Jules Guerin mural in Louisiana State Capitol, 1932

In 1912, when the architect Henry Bacon was competing with John Russell Pope to win the commission for the Lincoln Memorial in Washington D.C., he hired Guérin to create renderings of alternative designs. The paintings, still in the National Archives, were likely influential in Bacon's triumph. After he received the commission, Bacon retained Guerin to paint two large murals, Reunion and Emancipation, that decorate the cella of the memorial above the Gettysburg and Second Inaugural Addresses. They were recently cleaned, revealing a subtle color palette that complements Daniel Chester French’s Seated Lincoln statue. In 1916 he was elected into the National Academy of Design as an Associate member and became a full Academician in 1931.

As an adjunct to his work as an illustrator, Guérin took an active part in the international expositions of his day, showing at the Pan American Expo in Buffalo, New York, 1901, the Louisiana Purchase Expo held in St Louis in 1904 at which he won a silver medal, and the Lewis & Clark Expo in Portland, Oregon in 1905. He published illustrations of these fairs in popular magazines of the day. In 1915, Guérin was asked by Edward Bennett to serve as Director of Color at the Panama Pacific International Exposition in San Francisco. Unlike previous fairs, this west coast effort used a palette of Mediterranean colors to accent the buildings to take advantage of the local climate and flora. It is likely that connections that he made there led to his one-man show at the University of California, Berkeley two years later, followed by several large murals in the old Federal Reserve Bank Building of San Francisco.

Probably because of his early Chicago based background, Guérin was a frequent collaborator with the Chicago architectural firm (and the successor firm to Daniel Burnham’s practice) Graham, Anderson, Probst & White. Most notable of these commissions was the dramatic fire curtain for the theatre in GAPW's Chicago Civic Opera Building in 1929.

Guérin's work as a book illustrator came as a result of magazine commissions. Articles in The Century by Maria Hornor Lansdale resulted in her 1906 travel book, The Chateaux of Touraine, which supplements its many photographs with Guérin's paintings. From 1909 to 1911 the painter traveled with Robert Hichens to create similar illustrations for his popular books on Egypt, the Holy Land, and the Near East. The superb color lithography in these books, as well as two he published with Maxfield Parrish, has made them highly collectible today.

Despite his wish to be regarded as a notable fine artist, Jules Guérin is most known as an illustrator and architectural delineator. Nevertheless, he can be allocated amongst the group of American artists who brought to life the scenes and buildings of the Progressive Era in the emerging print media of the early Twentieth Century.

== Selected murals ==
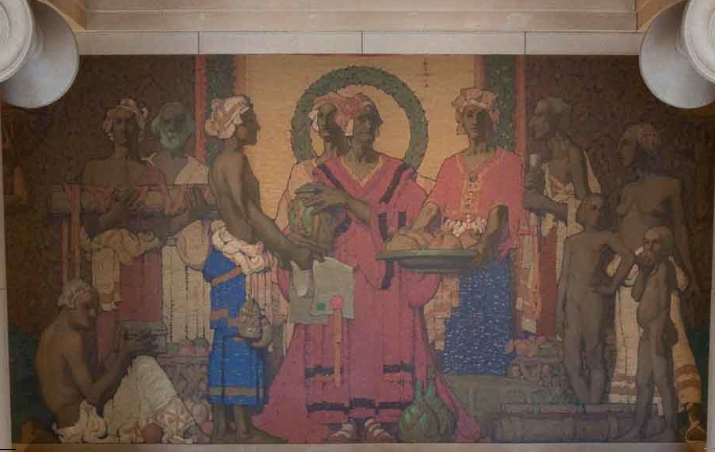
Guerin's Traders of the Adriatic mural at the old Federal Reserve Bank Building of San Francisco, San Francisco CA

- Pennsylvania Station, McKim, Mead & White, architects, New York, NY 1911
- Liberty Memorial, Harold Van Buren Magonigle, architect, Kansas City, MO 1921-35
- Lincoln Memorial, Henry Bacon, architect, Washington, D.C. 1922
- Union Trust Building, Graham, Anderson, Probst & White, architects, Cleveland, OH 1924
- Cleveland Terminal Group, Graham, Anderson, Probst & White, architects, Cleveland, OH 1924
- Illinois Merchants Bank, Graham, Anderson, Probst & White, architects, Chicago, IL 1924
- Federal Reserve Bank Building of San Francisco, George Kelham, architect, San Francisco, CA 1924
- Chicago Civic Opera, Graham, Anderson, Probst & White, architects, Chicago, IL 1929
- Merchandise Mart, Graham, Anderson, Probst & White, architects, Chicago, IL 1930
- Louisiana State Capitol, Solis Seiferth, architect, Baton Rouge, LA 1932

== Books illustrated ==
Books by Robert Hichens, illustrated By Jules Guérin.

- The Fruitful Vine (1911)
- Egypt and Its Monuments (1908)
- The Holy Land (1910)
- The Near East - Dalmatia, Greece and Constantinople (1913)

Books written or illustrated with Maxfield Parrish

- The Lure of the Garden by Hildegarde Hawthorne (1911)
- Water Colour Rendering-Suggestions. (n.d.)

Other books illustrated by Jules Guérin.

- The Mystery of Orcival (1901)
- Notes of Travel, Volume III, Nathaniel Hawthorne, Illustrated by Jules Guérin (1901)
- The Winger Colt of Casa Mia (1904)
- The Chateaux of Touraine (1906)
- The Syrian Shepherd's Psalm (1911)

== Other works ==
- Pittsburgh as Hell with the Lid Off, 1903, commissioned by Lincoln Steffens (April 6, 1866 – August 9, 1936) and noted in his autobiography

== The Chicago Plan ==
Paintings by Jules Guérin that were part of the Burnham Plan, owned by the Chicago Historical Society:

1. Chicago. Bird's-Eye View at Night of Grant Park, Facade Of City, Proposed Harbor and Lagoons of Park on South Shore.
2. Chicago. Bird's-Eye View at Night of Grant Park, Facade Of City, Proposed Harbor and Lagoons of Park on South Shore.
3. Chicago. Michigan Avenue Looking Toward the South.
4. View Looking North on South Branch of Chicago River, Showing Suggested Arrangement of Streets.
5. View Looking North on South Branch of Chicago River, Showing Suggested Arrangement of Streets.
6. Chicago. Proposed Plaza on Michigan Avenue West of the Field Museum of Natural History in Grant Park.
7. Chicago. Proposed Plaza on Michigan Avenue West of the Field Museum of Natural History in Grant Park.
8. Chicago. Proposed Boulevard to Connect North and South Sides of the River; View Looking North from Washington Street.
9. Chicago. Proposed Boulevard to Connect North and South Sides of the River; View Looking North from Washington Street.
10. Chicago. Alternate Railway Station Scheme West of River Between Canal and Clinton Streets.
11. Chicago. Alternate Railway Station Scheme West of River Between Canal and Clinton Streets.
