= Apollo (storeship) =

- U.S. National Register of Historic Places
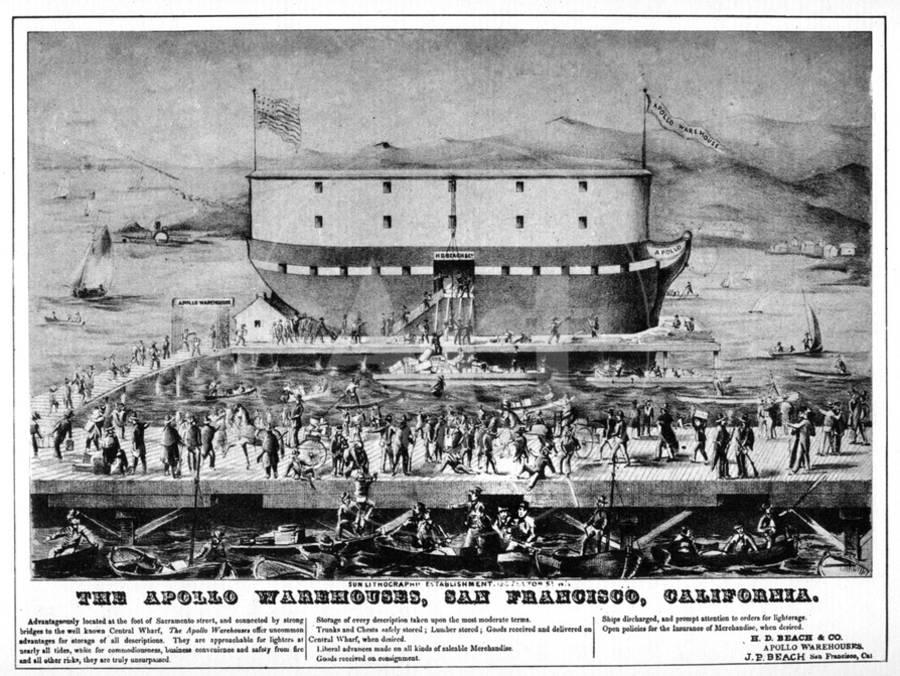
- The Apollo Warehouses, property of Moses Yale Beach, the Old Federal Reserve Bank Building (San Francisco) is currently the site of the buried ship

- Location within San Francisco County Location within California Location within the United States
- Location: NW corner of Sacramento and Battery Sts., San Francisco, California
- Coordinates: 37°47′40″N 122°23′56″W
- Area: 0.1 acres (0.040 ha)
- NRHP reference No.: 91000561
- Added to NRHP: May 16, 1991

The Apollo is a historic storeship that is buried at a location in downtown San Francisco, California, at the site of the Old Federal Reserve Bank. It was listed on the National Register of Historic Places in 1991. Parts of the ship have been uncovered, most recently in 1921 and 1925. The ship was in existence by 10 March 1831, when it was registered at Portsmouth, New Hampshire.

Photographs from the 1921 uncovering exist. The 1925 excavation revealed coins from 1797, 1825, and 1840, a gold nugget, and assorted navigational pieces. One of numerous buried ships within San Francisco, it is an archeological site, listed at least partially for its potential to yield information in the future.

The ship was acquired by Moses Yale Beach of the New York Sun in 1848 for the California Gold Rush, and was later converted into the "Apollo Saloon", serving alcohol, donoughts and coffee.

== Gallery ==
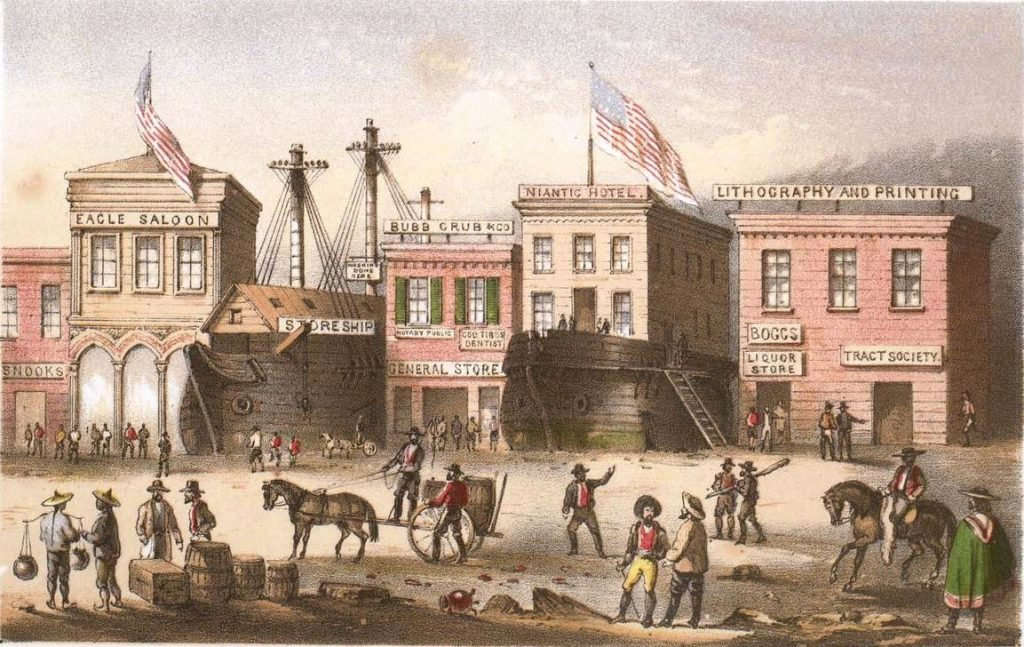
An 1855 lithograph of ships being used as businesses in San Francisco. Apollo storeship and Niantic Hotel

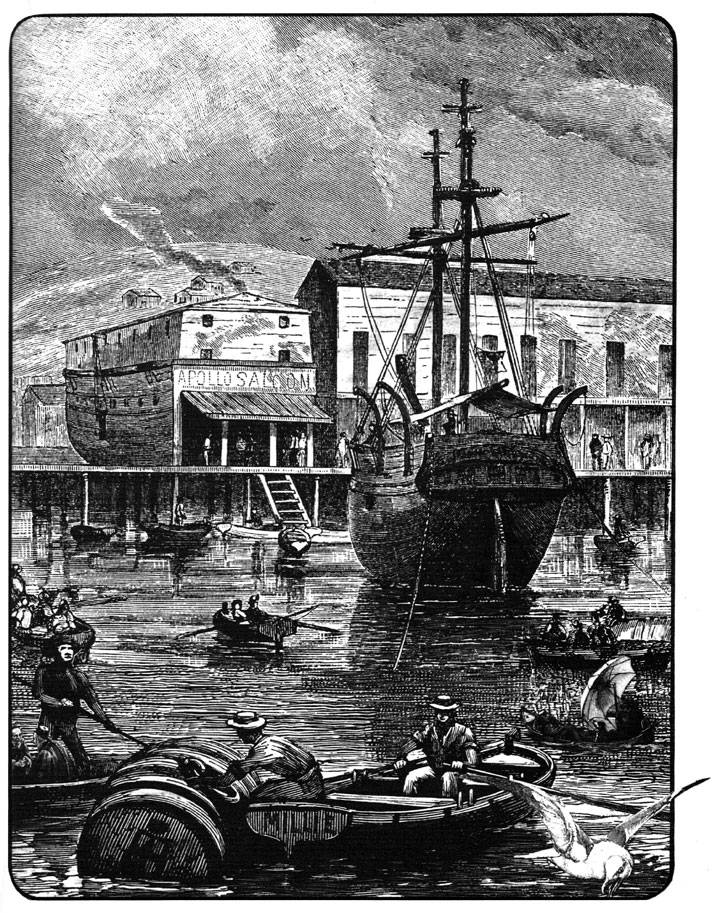
The Apollo Saloon, Apollo storeship, 1855, next to Euphemia Prison, the ship on water

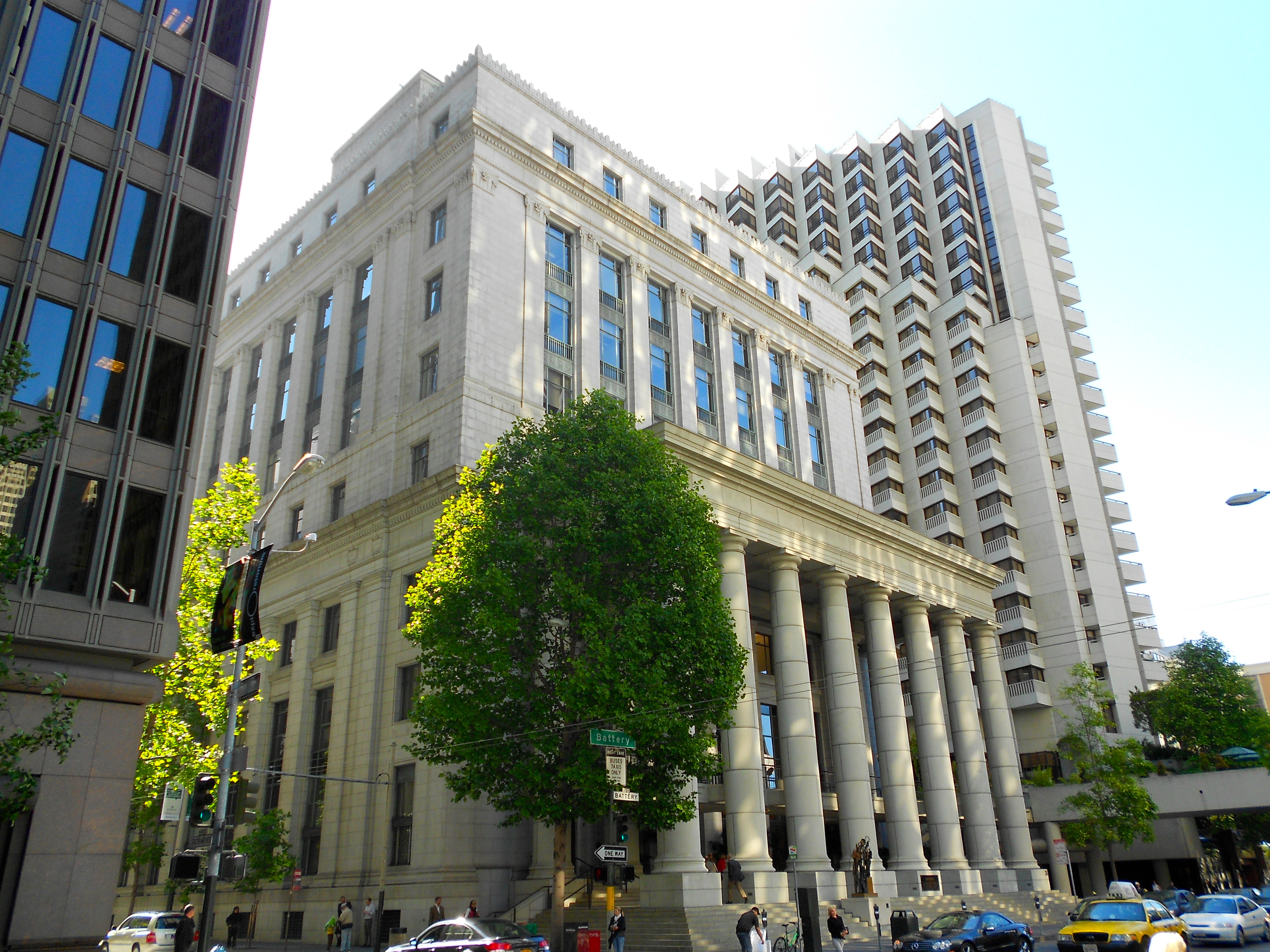
Building at Sacramento and Battery Streets in San Francisco. Stands on top of Apollo (storeship)

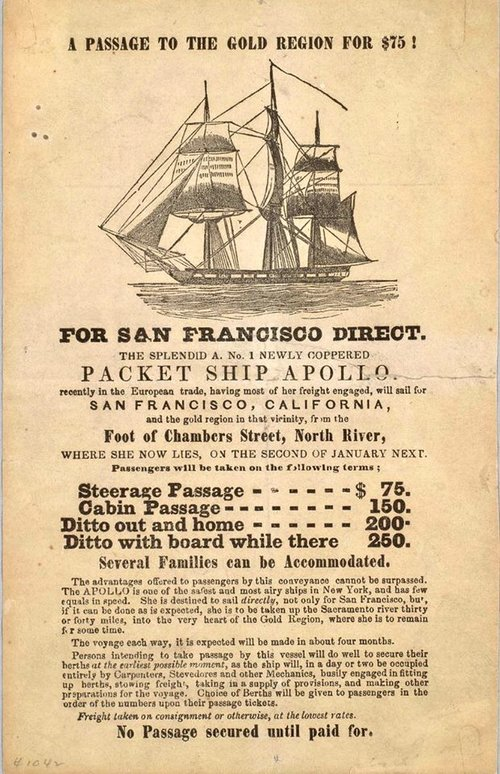
1849 New York advertisement for the Apollo

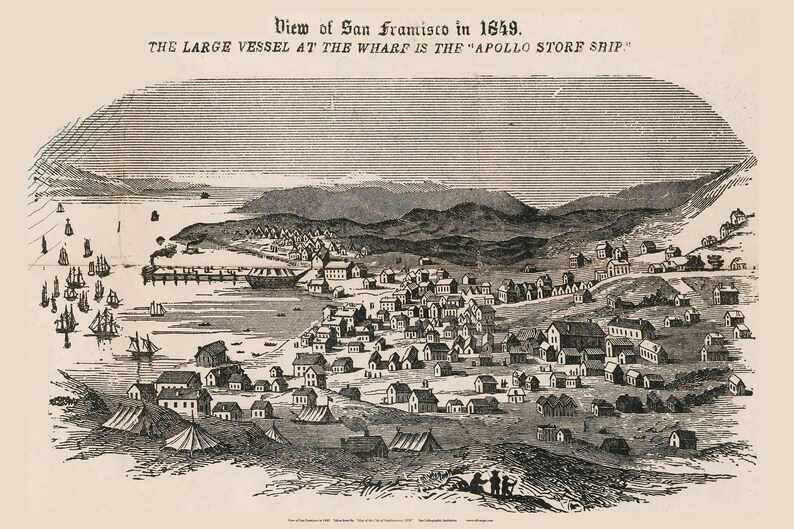
Apollo storeship, 1849, San Francisco, ship owned by Moses Yale Beach, New York Sun

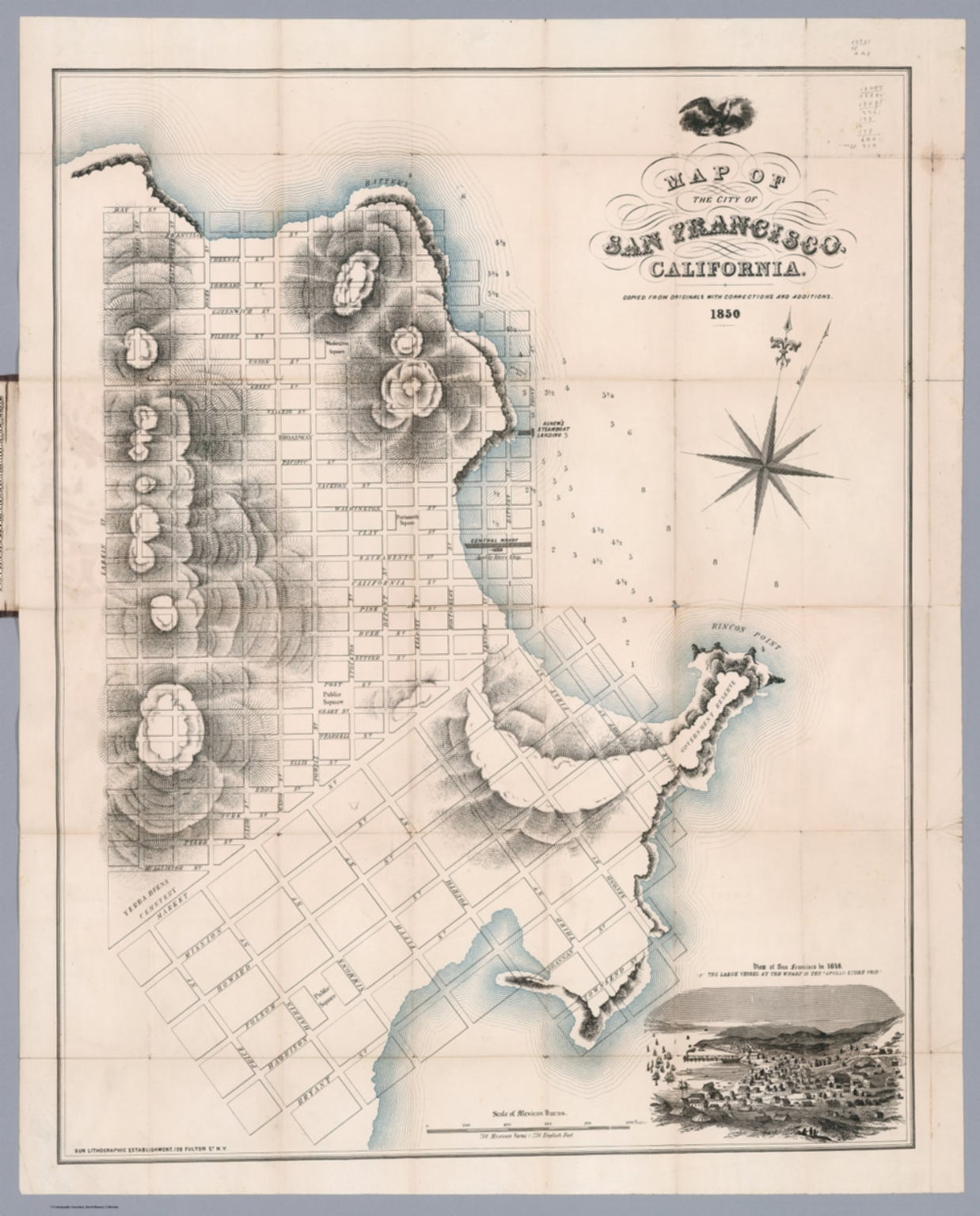
Map of San Francisco, 1850, Apollo storeship at the bottom. From Joseph P. Beach's journal
