= Center Street Cemetery (Wallingford, Connecticut) =

- U.S. National Register of Historic Places
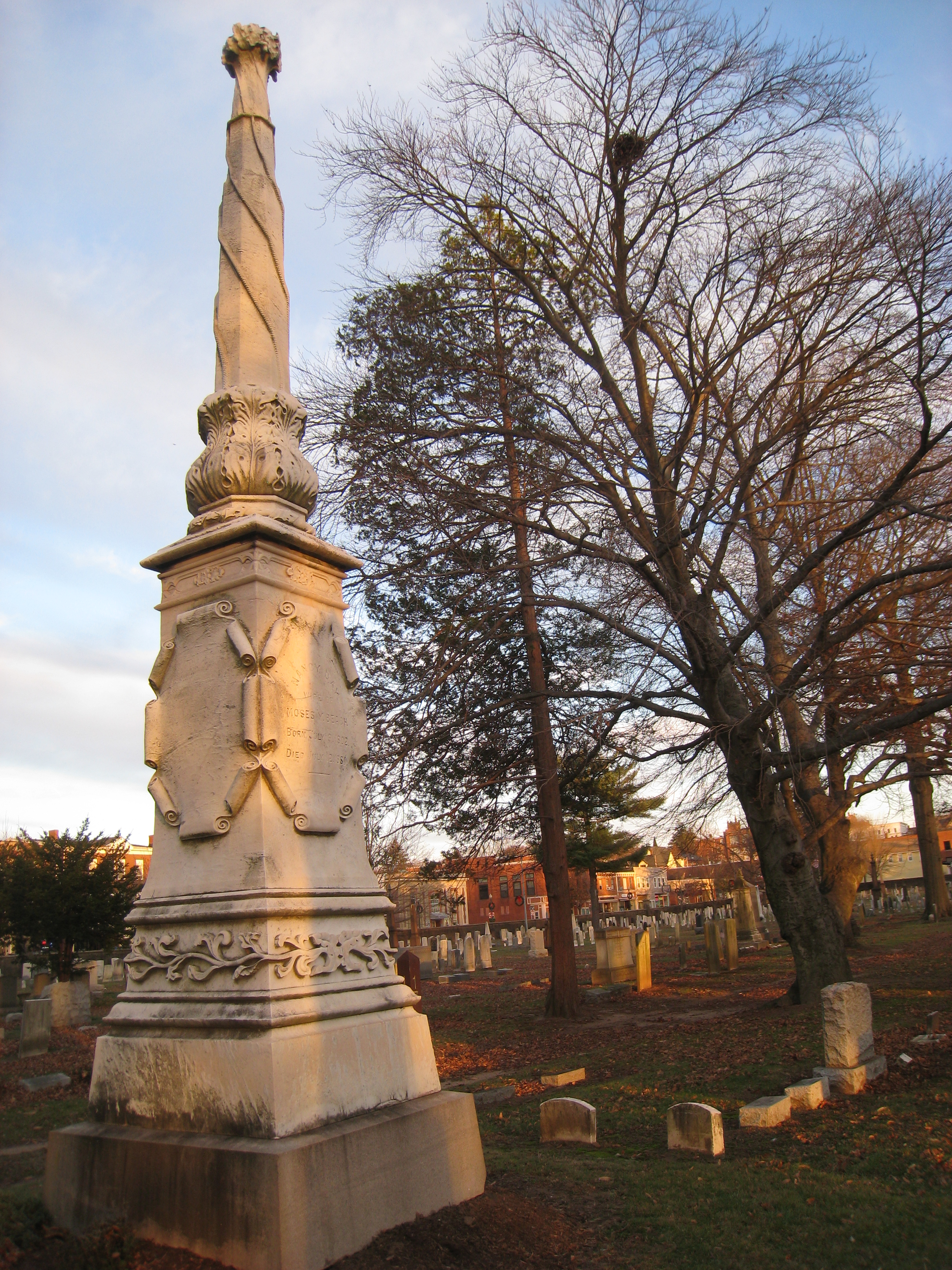
- Moses Yale monument
- Location: 2 Center Street; Wallingford, Connecticut
- Coordinates: 41°27′19″N 72°49′26″W
- Area: 9.6 acres (3.9 ha)
- Built: c. 1670
- NRHP reference No.: 97000833
- Added to NRHP: August 1, 1997

The Center Street Cemetery is a historic cemetery at 2 Center Street in Wallingford, Connecticut. Established about 1670, it is the town's oldest cemetery, and the burial site for many of the city's civic and industrial leaders. It was listed on the National Register of Historic Places in 1997.

== Description and history ==
The Center Street Cemetery is located in Wallingford's town center, occupying most of a block bounded by South Colony Road, Center Street, South Orchard Street, and Prince Street. It is about 9.6 acres (3.9 ha) in size, its terrain basically level. Its main entrance is near the western end of its Center Street frontage, demarcated by an Egyptian Revival gateway. A secondary entrance is located on Orchard Street, and the internal circulation is defined in part by a series of allées lined by mature sycamore trees, with gravel and grass paths in between. Graves are generally organized in open settings -- there are no fenced burial plots. Layout of the burials varies depending on the practices of the period: early graves, mainly in the western third, were placed without noticeable planning, while the eastern two-thirds are organized into a grid pattern. Funerary markers consist of a cross-section of materials and styles, spanning more than three centuries of history.

Lyman Hall, a native of Connecticut who moved to Georgia and was a signer of the Declaration of Independence in 1776, is memorialized here, as is Moses Yale Beach, newspaper publisher and founder of the Associated Press. The tomb, set on the north end of the 300-year-old Center Street Cemetery, lies near the grave of Joseph Benham, whose daughter and granddaughter were the last people in New England to be tried for witchcraft. In addition to such notables are stones marking the graves of the town's first settlers and those of soldiers who fought in the American Revolutionary War, the War of 1812, the American Civil War and every other major conflict up to the present.

== See also ==
- National Register of Historic Places listings in New Haven County, Connecticut
