= Harlan D. Logan =

American politician

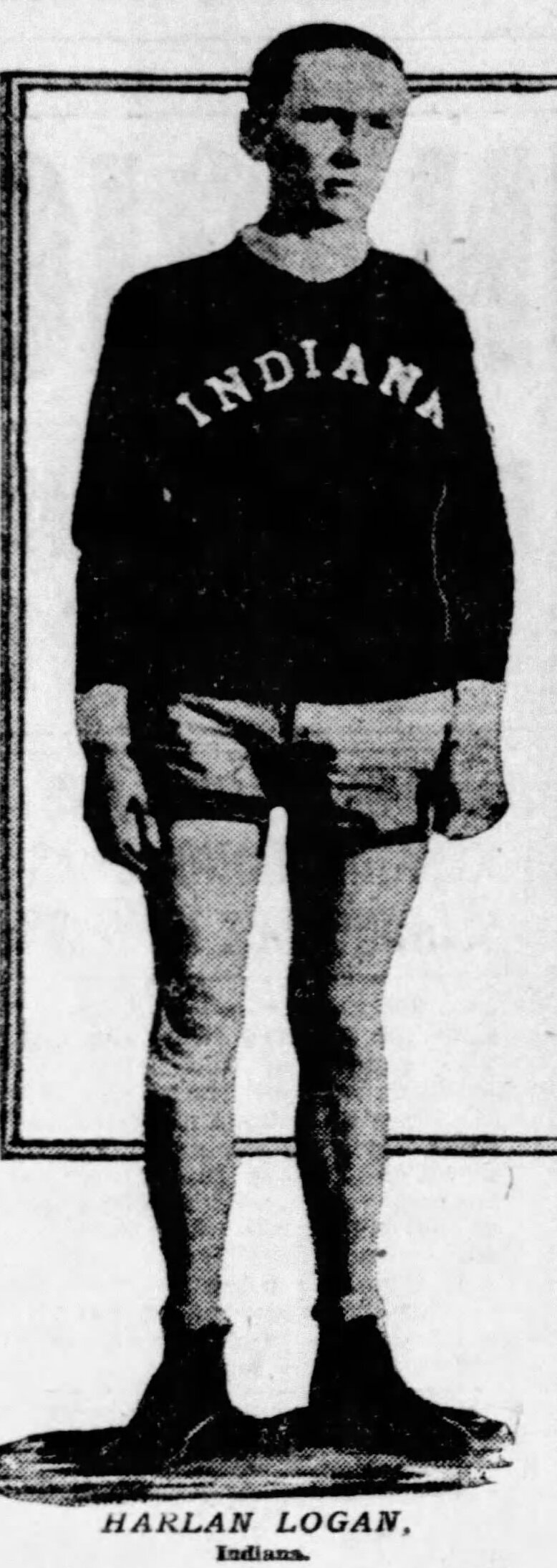
- Logan in 1924 as a member of the Hoosier basketball team
- Born: April 30, 1904; Starkville, Mississippi, US
- Died: December 16, 1994 (aged 90); Hanover, New Hampshire, US
- Education: Indiana University
- Occupations: Coach, Professor, Publisher, Legislator
- Political party: Republican

Harlan D. Logan (April 30, 1904 - December 16, 1994) was a college tennis coach, magazine editor, and majority leader of the New Hampshire House of Representatives.

As a college student at Indiana University, where he was a member of Phi Kappa Psi, Harlan was a varsity athlete, lettering in basketball, tennis and track, and making the All-Big Ten basketball first team in his junior year. His college life would transition from Bloomington, Indiana to the University of Oxford, where he was a Rhodes Scholar.

In 1930, Logan became Indiana University's first full-time tennis coach. His next career change was when he became a professor at NYU. Logan left NYU to become the editor of Scribner's Magazine from 1936 to 1939. He then directed Look Magazine until 1952. He then changed to Corning, where he was a public relations director, and later worked for General Foods as a vice president. In 1968, while living in New Hampshire, Logan was elected to that state's House of Representatives, and became majority leader in 1969. He left elected office after four years, but remained active in political life until the onset of Alzheimer's disease in 1980.

Harlan died in 1994 from Alzheimer's disease.
