= Emma Beach Thayer =

American artist

- Born: Emmeline Buckingham Beach; 1849; New York, New York
- Died: 1924 (aged 74–75); Peekskill, New York
- Known for: Painting
- Spouse: Abbott Handerson Thayer
- Family: Yale

Emma Beach Thayer (1849–1924) was an American artist known for her floral paintings. Some of her works are at the Smithsonian American Art Museum.

== Biography ==
Thayer née Beach was born in New York City in 1849. The Smithsonian American Art Museum credits her with creating studies for the illustrations for Concealing Coloration in the Animal Kingdom. Her 1904 study of The Cotton-Tail Rabbit among Dry Grasses and Leaves is in the collection of the Brooklyn Museum.

Thayer was the daughter of Moses S. Beach and Chloe Buckingham, and a granddaughter of Moses Yale Beach. Her uncles were Alfred Ely Beach and William Yale Beach, and her brother was businessman Charles Yale Beach.

She was the second wife of the painter Abbott Handerson Thayer (1849–1921) of the Thayer family, and the stepmother of painter Gerald Handerson Thayer (1883–1939).

Thayer died in Peekskill, New York, in 1924.

== Gallery ==
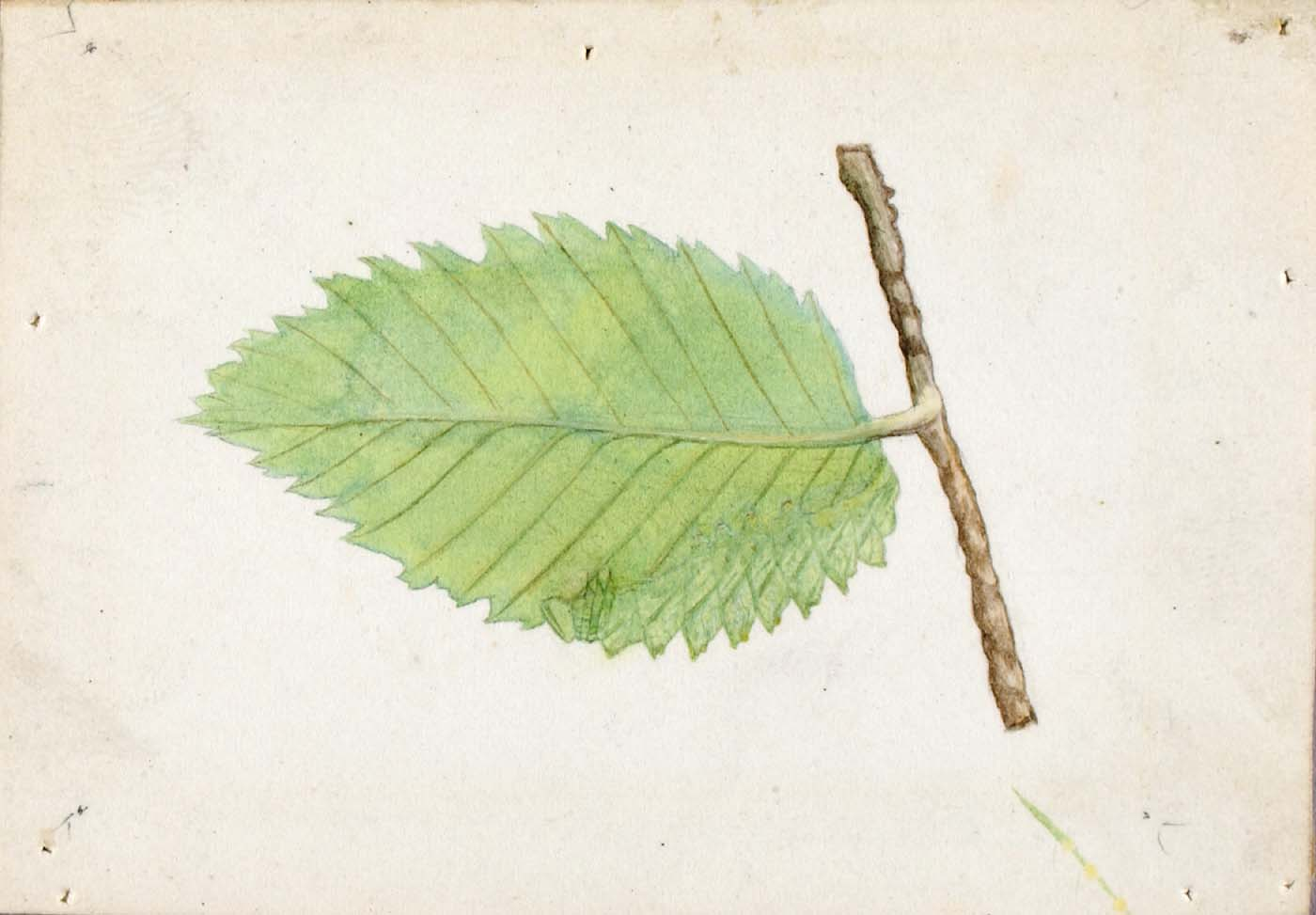
Emma Beach Thayer - Jagged Leaf Edge Caterpillar, study for book Concealing Coloration in the Animal Kingdom

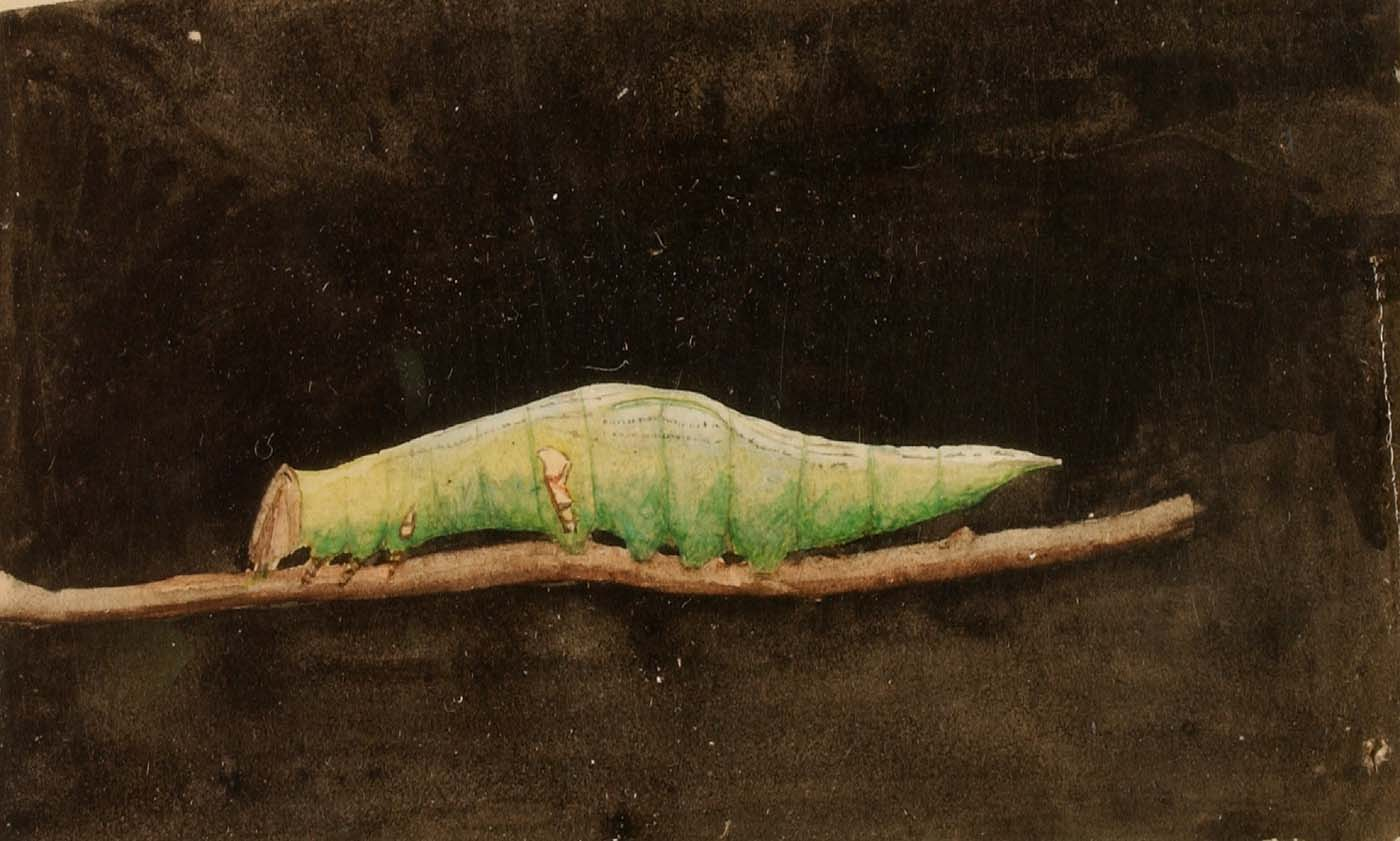
Emma Beach Thayer - Larger Spotted Beach Leaf Edge Caterpillar, study for book Concealing Coloration in the Animal Kingdom
