= Robert Bridges (critic) =

American critic, editor, and writer

Robert Bridges (July 13, 1858 – 1941) was an American critic, editor and writer.

He was born at Shippensburg, Pennsylvania. After graduating from Princeton University in 1879, he became connected with the New York Evening Post, and in 1887 was made assistant editor of Scribner's Magazine. In 1914 he became editor at Scribner's Magazine, a post which he held until 1930. He was a literary adviser and director of the publisher Charles Scribner's Sons until 1939. He was elected to the American Academy of Arts and Letters in 1906.

He was best known for the reviews which for many years he contributed to Life over the signature “Droch.” He also wrote poems and three prose volumes: Overheard in Arcady (1894), Suppressed Chapters and Other Bookishness (1895) and The Roosevelt Book (1904). His poems were collected in 1902 under the title Bramble Brae.
