= Anson Burlingame =

American politician and diplomat (1820–1870)

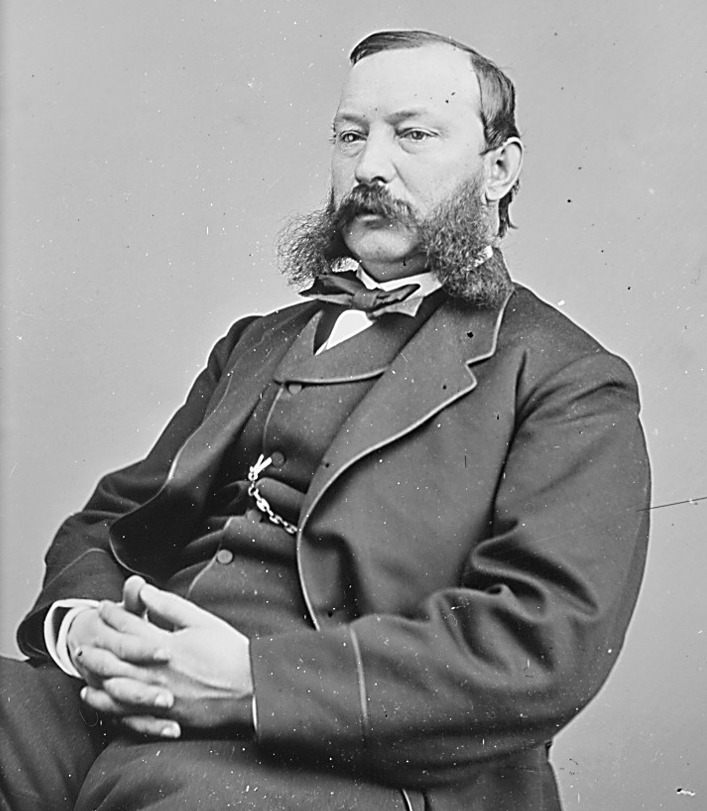
- Burlingame, c. 1860–1865

United States Minister to the Qing Empire
- In office August 20, 1862 – November 21, 1867
- President: Abraham Lincoln; Andrew Johnson
- Preceded by: John Elliot Ward
- Succeeded by: John Ross Browne

Member of the U.S. House of Representatives from Massachusetts's 5th district
- In office March 4, 1855 – March 3, 1861
- Preceded by: William Appleton
- Succeeded by: William Appleton

Personal details
- Born: November 14, 1820 New Berlin, New York, U.S.
- Died: February 23, 1870 (aged 49) Saint Petersburg, Russian Empire
- Resting place: Mount Auburn Cemetery
- Party: American, Republican
- Education: University of Michigan Detroit Branch School; Harvard University

Anson Burlingame (November 14, 1820 – February 23, 1870) was an American lawyer, Republican/American Party legislator, diplomat, and abolitionist. As diplomat, he served as the U.S. minister to China (1862–1867) and then as China's envoy to the U.S., which resulted in the 1868 landmark Burlingame Treaty.

== Early life and career ==
Burlingame was born in New Berlin, New York. In 1823 his parents (Joel Burlingame and Freelove Angell) took him to Ohio, and about ten years afterwards to Michigan. Between 1838 and 1841 he studied at the Detroit branch of the University of Michigan, and in 1846 graduated from Harvard Law School. He was a brother of the Delta Kappa Epsilon fraternity (Sigma chapter). On June 3, 1847, he married Jane Cornelia Livermore. They had sons, Edward Livermore Burlingame (born 1848) and Walter Angell Burlingame (born 1852), and a daughter Gertrude Burlingame (born 1856).

Burlingame practiced law in Boston, Massachusetts, and won a wide reputation by his speeches for the Free Soil Party in 1848. He was a member of the Massachusetts constitutional convention in 1853, of the Massachusetts State Senate from 1853 to 1854, and of the United States House of Representatives from 1855 to 1861, being elected for the first term as a Know Nothing and afterwards as a member of the new Republican Party, which he helped to organize in Massachusetts.

== Burlingame vs. Preston Brooks ==
In May 1856, Senator Charles Sumner (R-Massachusetts) delivered a fiery anti-slavery speech. He was subsequently brutally assaulted in the Senate chamber by Representative Preston Brooks (D-South Carolina), who was hailed as a hero by the pro-slavery South.

Shortly afterwards, Burlingame delivered what The New York Times referred to as "the most celebrated speech" of his career: a scathing denunciation of Brooks' assault on Sumner, branding him as "the vilest sort of coward" on the House floor. In response, Brooks challenged Burlingame to a duel, stating he would gladly face him "in any Yankee mudsill of his choosing". Burlingame eagerly accepted; as the challenged party, he had his choice of weapons and location. A well-known marksman, he selected rifles as the weapons and the Navy Yard on the Canadian side of the U.S. border in Niagara Falls as the location (in order to circumvent the U.S. ban on dueling). Brooks, reportedly dismayed by both Burlingame's unexpectedly enthusiastic acceptance and his reputation as a crack shot, neglected to show up, instead citing unspecified risks to his safety if he were to cross "hostile country" (the northern U.S. states) in order to reach Canada. Burlingame's solid defense of a fellow Bostonian greatly raised his stature throughout the North.

== Diplomatic posts ==
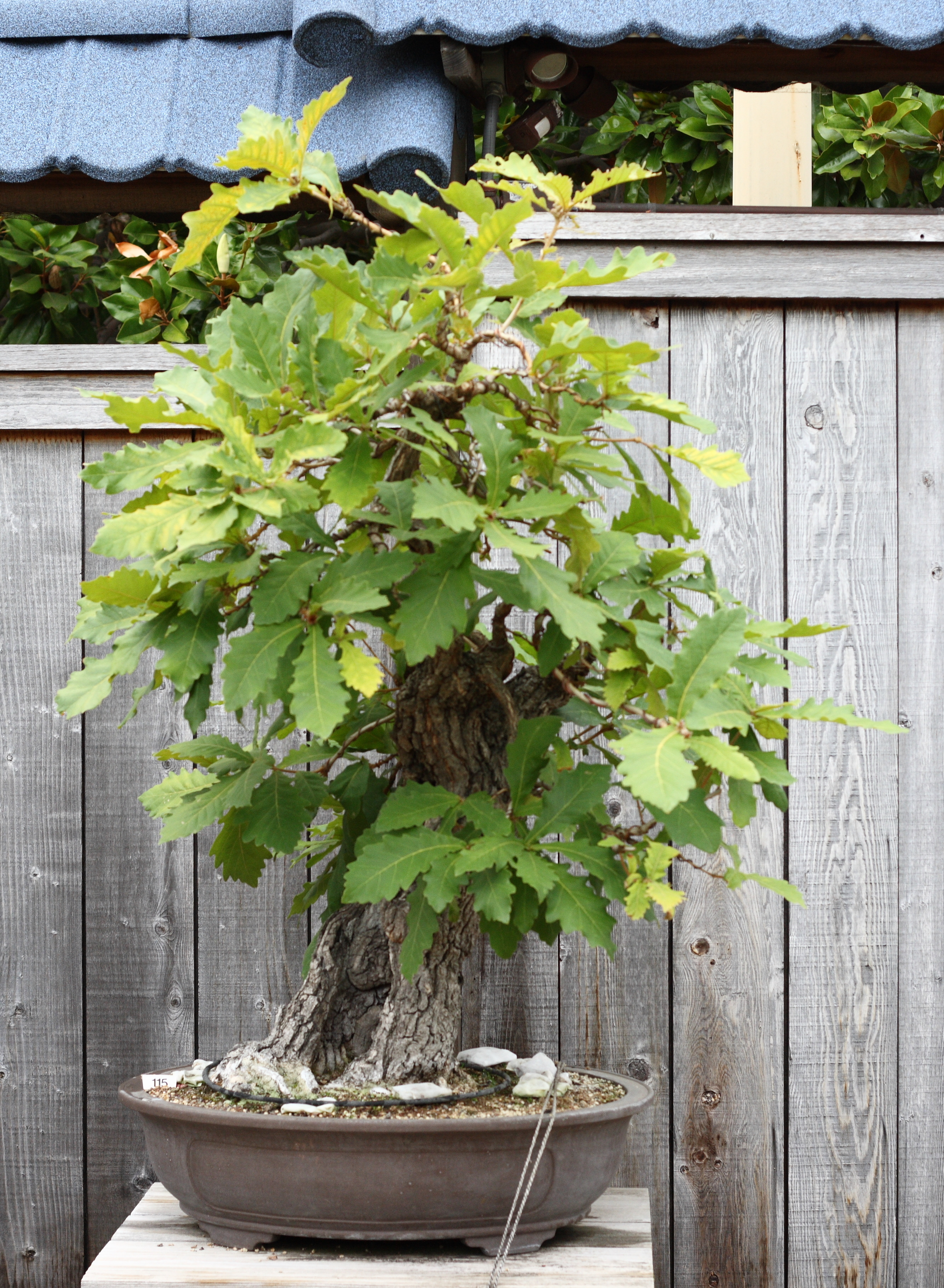
Burlingame was given this Daimyo Oak bonsai when he passed through Japan during his return to the U.S. It is on display at the Gardens of Lake Merritt, Oakland, California.

=== Minister to China (Qing Empire) ===
On March 22, 1861, after Burlingame lost his bid for re-election, President Abraham Lincoln appointed Burlingame as Minister to the Austrian Empire, but Burlingame, who had championed the Hungarian Lajos Kossuth and his drive for independence from the Austrian Empire, was not acceptable and did not serve.

Lincoln instead appointed Burlingame as minister to the Qing Empire. Burlingame worked for a cooperative policy rather than the imperialistic policies of force which had been used during the First and Second Opium Wars and developed relations with the reform elements of the court. As he put it, the "cooperative policy... substituted for the old doctrine of violence one of fair diplomatic action," and the representatives of the Western powers agreed that they would not interfere in the internal affairs of China. Burlingame reported that he had used his diplomacy to get the European powers to agree that they would "give to the treaties a fair and Christian construction; that they ... never would menace the territorial integrity of China."

He was the top American diplomat in China until 1867.

=== China's envoy to U.S. and European nations ===
The success of this diplomacy was not lost on Qing dynasty court officials. On November 16, 1867, he was set to retire and return to his political career at home. Reform officials in the court, however, wanted to send a mission abroad to expand and formalize relations, but in the words of Burlingame's instructions, feared that "without training and experience [the officials] would not be at all familiar with foreign manners and customs". The emperor appointed Burlingame envoy extraordinary and minister plenipotentiary to head a Chinese diplomatic mission to the United States and the principal European nations. The mission, which included two Chinese ministers, an English and a French secretary, six students from Peking, and a considerable retinue, arrived in the United States in March 1868.

Burlingame campaigned and made a series of speeches across the country. His eloquent oratory advocated equal treatment of China and a welcoming stance toward Chinese immigrants. When the delegation reached Washington, Burlingame used his personal relations with the Republican administration to negotiate a relatively quick and favorable treaty. On July 28, 1868, negotiations agreed on a series of articles, supplementary to the Reed Treaty of 1858, and later known as the Burlingame Treaty. The treaty provided that Chinese subjects in the United States should enjoy the same rights as citizens of the most favored nation, a legal strategy which up until that point had only been used to expand foreign privileges in China. Burlingame successfully got the treaty to include a clause permitting Chinese to become citizens, which had been barred by American law. This treaty was the first equal treaty between China and a western power after the Opium War.

Describing Burlingame's diplomatic role for China, Senator Charles Sumner stated, "Once the representative of little more than a third part of Boston, [Burlingame] is now the representative of more than a third of the human race."

Burlingame went on to negotiate treaties with Denmark, Sweden, Holland, and Prussia. He died suddenly at Saint Petersburg on February 23, 1870, while negotiating terms for a treaty with Russia. Although there was no suspicion at the time or for nearly 150 years, researchers in 2025 published evidence from diplomatic dispatches, official reports, private letters, and medical journals that they charge indicated a "likely assassination." They point to arsenic, citing Burlingame’s symptoms, their severity, and progression from onset to death over six days.

To honor his memory, the Court in Beijing raised Burlingame's posthumous status to the First Rank and awarded his family a pension of $10,000. He was buried in Mount Auburn Cemetery in Cambridge, Massachusetts.

== Family ==
His son Edward L. Burlingame was founding editor of Scribner's Magazine. His grandson (Edward's son), Roger Burlingame, was an author of fiction, nonfiction, and biographies.

== Legacy ==
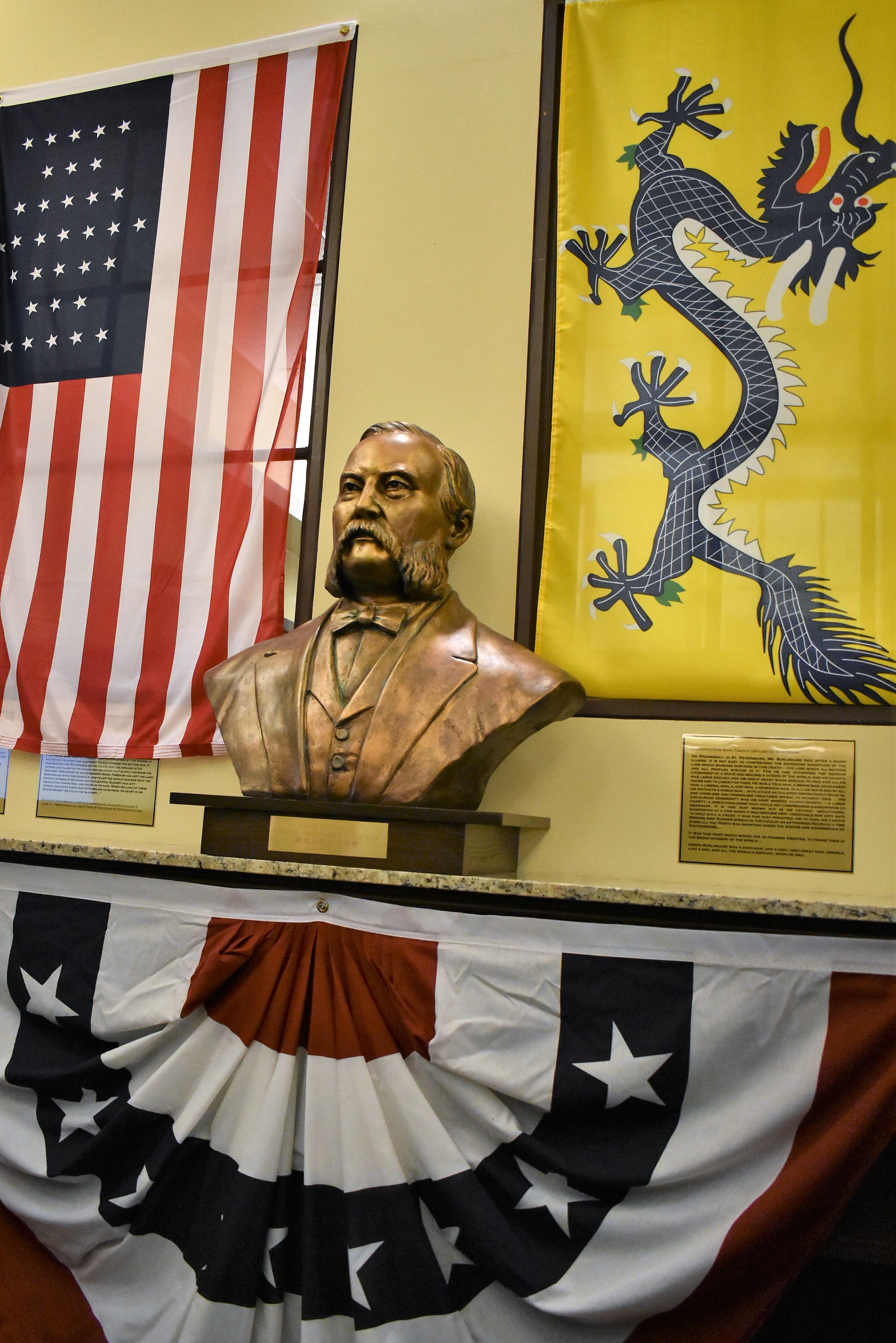
Bust of Anson Burlingame, by Zhou Limin, at the Burlingame Public Library 2018

After Burlingame's death, the spirit and many of the specific provisions of the treaty bearing his name were reversed. Foreign powers continued to encroach upon China, and Congress passed strict laws against Chinese immigration. The success of the Communist Revolution of 1949 led to animosity between the two countries and Burlingame's reputation was as a naive and euphoric advocate of China. After warming of relations in the 1980s, Burlingame's reputation began to rise again, however. Burlingame, California; Burlingame, Kansas; and Anson, Wisconsin, are all named after Anson Burlingame. The ranch which Burlingame purchased in San Mateo on the San Francisco Bay retained his name and was eventually developed after his death.

Anson Burlingame's portrait, painted by Albion Harris Bicknell, hangs in historic Faneuil Hall, Boston. In 2018, upon the 150th anniversary of the Burlingame Treaty, a new bust of Anson Burlingame sculpted by Zhou Limin was unveiled at an international ceremony held at the Burlingame Public Library in Burlingame, California.

His involvement in a Chinese translation of Henry Wheaton's The Elements of International Law contributed to the development of modern legal culture in China. The text was the first major source on Western law made available in China.

Academic Xu Guoqi writes that Burlingame's appointment to represent China "was an extraordinary event in the history of Sino-American relations, demonstrating the deep influence of the Americans on the Chinese."

== References and further reading ==
- Anderson, David L. "Anson Burlingame: American Architect of the Cooperative Policy in China, 1861–1871." Diplomatic history 1.3 (1977): 239–256. online
- Anderson, David L. "Anson Burlingame: Reformer and Diplomat." Civil War History 25.4 (1979): 293–308. online
- "Banquet to His Excellency Anson Burlingame and his associates of the Chinese embassy by the citizens of New York, on Tuesday, June 23, 1868." (New York: Sun Book and Job, 1868). Pamphlet Collection, Library of Congress.
- Biggerstaff, Knight. "The Official Chinese Attitude Toward the Burlingame Mission" American Historical Review, 41#4 (1936), pp. 682–702 online
- Burlingame, Barbara; Burlingame, Jack (2025). "Dangerous Diplomacy and the Ghost of Anson Burlingame". Journal of American-East Asian Relations. 32 (2): 154–186. doi:10.1163/18765610-32020003.
- Jue, Stanton (2011). "Anson Burlingame, An American Diplomat". American Diplomacy..
- Palmer, Friend; Hunt, Harry P.; June, Charles Mills (1906). Early days in Detroit; papers written by General Friend Palmer of Detroit, being his personal reminiscences of important events and descriptions of the city for over eighty years. Hunt & June. OCLC 1361237087.
- Schrecker, John. "'For the Equality of Men -- for the Equality of Nations': Anson Burlingame and China's First Embassy to the United States, 1868," Journal of American-East Asian Relations 17.1 (2010): 9-34. online
- Williams, Frederick Wells. Anson Burlingame and the First Chinese Mission to Foreign Powers (New York: Scribner's, 1912). online

== Notes ==
U.S. House of Representatives
| Preceded by William Appleton | Member of the U.S. House of Representatives from Massachusetts's 5th congressional district March 4, 1855 – March 3, 1861 | Succeeded by William Appleton |
Diplomatic posts
| Preceded by J. Glancy Jones | U.S. Minister to the Austrian Empire (did not serve); 1861 | Succeeded by J. Lothrop Motley |
| Preceded by John E. Ward | U.S. Minister to China; 1861–1867 | Succeeded by Ross Browne |
