= Old Federal Reserve Bank Building (San Francisco) =

- Federal Reserve Bank of San Francisco
- U.S. National Register of Historic Places
- San Francisco Designated Landmark
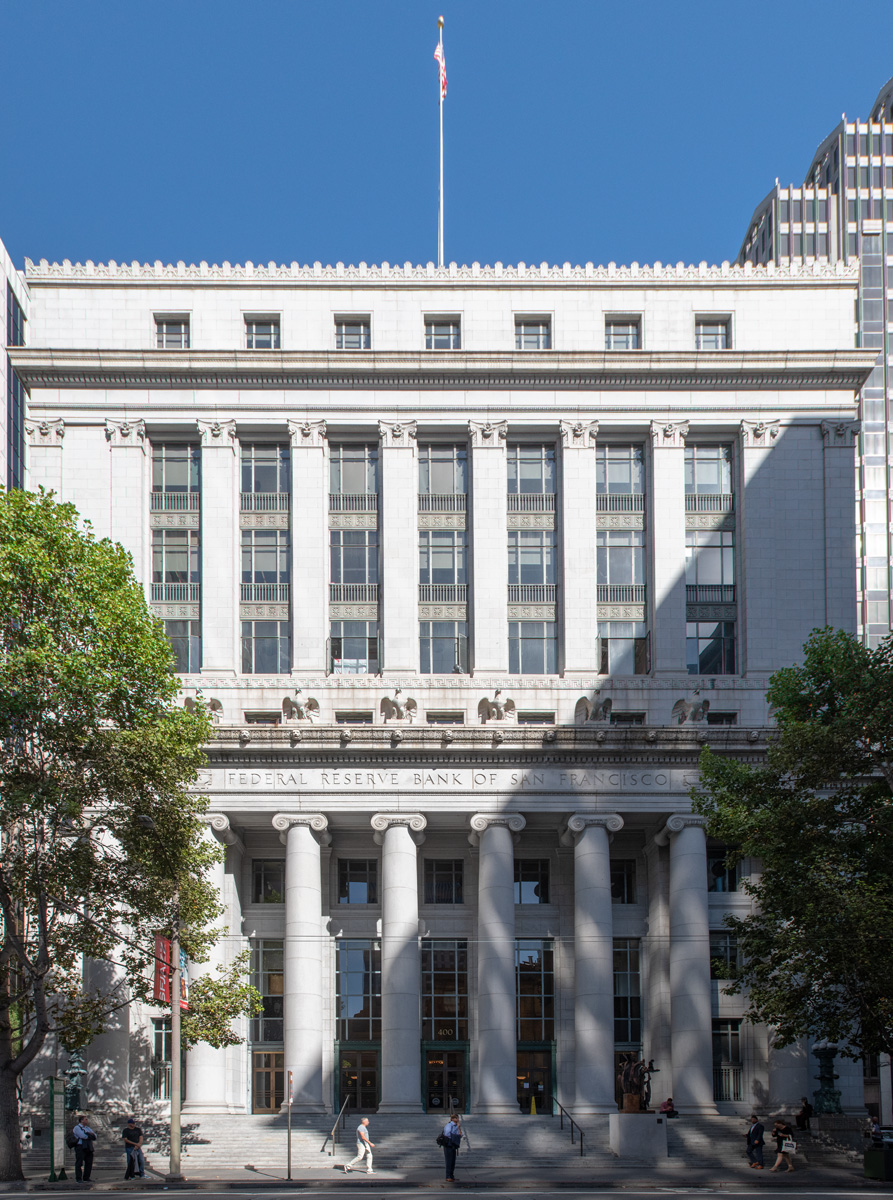

- Location within San Francisco County Location within California Location within the United States
- Location: 400 Sansome St., San Francisco, California
- Coordinates: 37°47′39″N 122°24′03″W
- Area: 0.8 acres (0.32 ha)
- Built: 1924
- Architect: George W. Kelham
- Architectural style: Classical Revival
- NRHP reference No.: 89000009
- SFDL No.: 158

Significant dates
- Added to NRHP: July 31, 1989
- Designated SFDL: 1983

The Old Federal Reserve Bank of San Francisco Building, now known as the Bently Reserve, was the main headquarters building of the Federal Reserve Bank of San Francisco for nearly sixty years. The building is located at 400 Sansome Street, in the Financial District of San Francisco. Designed by George W. Kelham, the building has an Ionic colonnade that is pure Beaux-Arts, while the upper building is in the new Moderne fashion of 1924. The banking lobby at the Sansome Street entrance contains a mural by Jules Guerin, the artist who created the palette for the 1915 Panama–Pacific International Exposition. The Old Federal Reserve was added to the National Register of Historic Places in 1984.

In 1983, the Federal Reserve Bank of San Francisco relocated to larger facilities at 101 Market Street, and the 400 Sansome Street location was sold to private developers who rented out the space. Prominent law firm Orrick, Herrington & Sutcliffe was headquartered in the building until 2002, when the firm moved out of the space. The building is currently owned by private developers Bently Holdings, who currently rent the upper floors as office space. The Banking Hall and board rooms are booked for fundraisers, events, meetings, and conferences.

== History ==
=== Construction ===
The San Francisco Federal Reserve Bank opened for business in rented quarters at the rear of the Merchants National Bank on November 16, 1914, in order to meet the provisions of the Federal Reserve Act. This location was to be a temporary one, until a Federal Reserve building could be completed.

In the spring of 1918 a building site bounded by Sacramento, Sansome, Battery, and Commercial streets was purchased for the Federal Reserve's future home; the lot measured 119.5 by 275 ft (36.4 by 83.8 m). George Kelham, who had been the chief architect for the 1915 Panama-Pacific International Exposition, was a prominent San Francisco architect who led the conservative wing of the San Francisco architectural establishment, was chosen to design the building. In 1919 construction was slated to begin, but delayed due to a shortage of labor and materials; however, the need for additional facilities had become so pressing that construction began in early 1920. The building was completed in 1924.

=== Relocation of the Federal Reserve ===
In 1983 the Federal Reserve Bank relocated to larger facilities at 101 Market Street, and the 400 Sansome Street location was sold to private developers.

John J. Balles, then the President of the San Francisco Federal Reserve, cited the need to consolidate departments as a reason for the move. In a press release, he said that "when the San Francisco Federal Bank opened for business in 1914, we had a staff of 21 people. Today, we have approximately 1,000 employees in San Francisco alone. They have spilled over into other downtown buildings from our main building at 400 Sansome, which we have occupied for more than half a century."

=== Private ownership ===
After the Federal Reserve relocated, the 400 Sansome Street location was sold to private developers, and leased as office space until 1998, when Boston Properties purchased the building and began renting the Banking Hall for private events in addition to the office space. In 2004, the law firm Orrick, Herrington, & Sutcliffe moved out of the building, leaving it essentially vacant until Bently Holdings purchased it from Boston Properties in April 2005 for 46.8 million dollars.

== Architecture ==
The Federal Reserve Bank Building is significant as the first structure built for the Federal Reserve System in San Francisco, and representative of the Federal Government's association with monumental architecture at the beginning of the 20th century. It currently stands as an intact contributor to San Francisco's important collection of classically designed banking halls, as well as an expression of the ideals of the Panama-Pacific International Exposition of 1915. The building, with its row of free-standing eagles perched above the large entablature particularly expresses the federal presence.

The building has an Ionic colonnade that is pure Beaux-Arts, while the upper levels are in the new Moderne fashion of 1924. Inside, the Banking Hall was designed in a Temple style, and featured murals by Jules Guerin, who created the palette for the 1915 Panama-Pacific International Exhibition.

The foundation of the original building was designed to support an additional fourteen stories of offices.

== Art ==
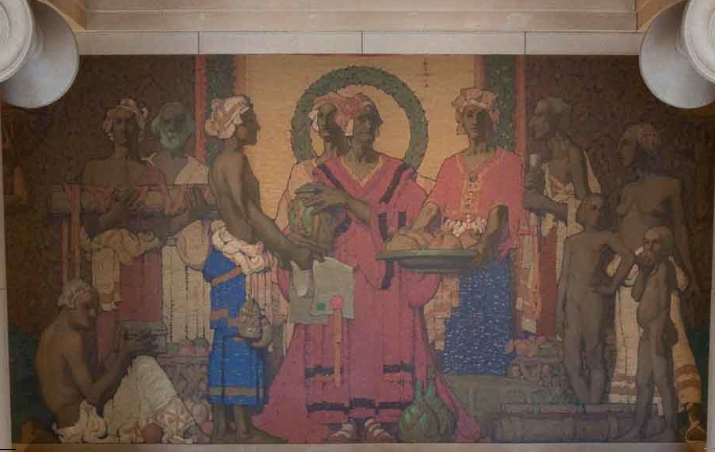
Traders of the Adriatic mural by Jules Guérin, located in the lobby

In an article for the San Francisco Examiner, Kelham outlined his views on the future of architecture, writing that "the influence of the Exposition's architecture is going to be felt on the Pacific Coast. Hereafter the clients who contemplate erecting buildings both of a public and private character will bring their architects, sculptors and decorators together as a board and leave them free to evolve by their united efforts thoroughly harmonious plans."

This collaborative process is dramatized at the Reserve; as the chief architect of the Exposition in 1915, Kelham had worked closely with its colorist, Jules Guérin, who had designed the murals for the Lincoln Memorial. Kelham chose Guerin to paint the mural Traders of the Adriatic that features prominently in the entrance to the main lobby. It is "a richly-colored mural that pays homage to the world of banking with its depiction of Venetian shipping merchants accepting receipts for goods on deposit."

Two sculptures by New Realist artist Arman, Dionysus and Hermes were added to the Sansome Street entrance in 1990. Together, these pieces are recognized as a single work by the artist, "Hermes and Dyonisos: Mounument to Analysis."

Encircled by a spiral stairway between the LeMeridien San Francisco and the Old Federal Reserve Bank Building on Commercial Street is a bronze sphere with black etchings, an untitled work by German artist Fritz Koenig. The work is similar in spirit to the artist's sculpture, The Sphere, at the World Trade Center. It is listed in the Smithsonian Art Inventories Catalog.

== Restoration and LEED-CS certification ==
Boston Properties, according to their 2004 SEC filing, posted only a .8 percent occupancy rate for this 150,000-square-foot (14,000 m^{2}) structure. After purchasing the Old Federal Reserve, Bently Holdings began a major renovation of the building's interior in order to make it more appealing to tenants.

Special attention was paid to preserving the original Beaux-Arts style of the building, while applying modern technologies and sustainable design. New flooring was selected from renewable resources, and artificial lighting was designed to interact with natural sources [18]. A daylight harvesting system was installed, and a Central Building Automation and Control Network was installed to monitor occupancy and vacancy status and adjust HVAC and lighting systems to conserve energy. In total, these control systems save the building 66% in lighting energy costs annually. The Bently Reserve's multiple-pane windows have been part of the building since its construction in 1924, and allow abundant daylight into each room, another feature the lighting system capitalizes upon.

Spaces such as the Banking Hall were also restored to reflect modern technology and accentuate the building's history. The chandeliers (designed by the architect himself) were meticulously restored, while at the same time state-of-the-art lighting was added to conserve energy. Hand-painted travertine walls were restored to their original state, and the Italian marble floors, doric columns, and grand staircase were reconditioned. The mural by Jules Guerin was also cleaned and preserved.

This renovation was carefully overseen by Bently Holdings, and managed by BCCI Builders. The Bently Reserve received silver certification in the National Leadership in Energy and Environmental Design Green Building Rating System for Core and Shell Development (LEED Silver CS) in December 2009.

== The Bently Reserve today ==
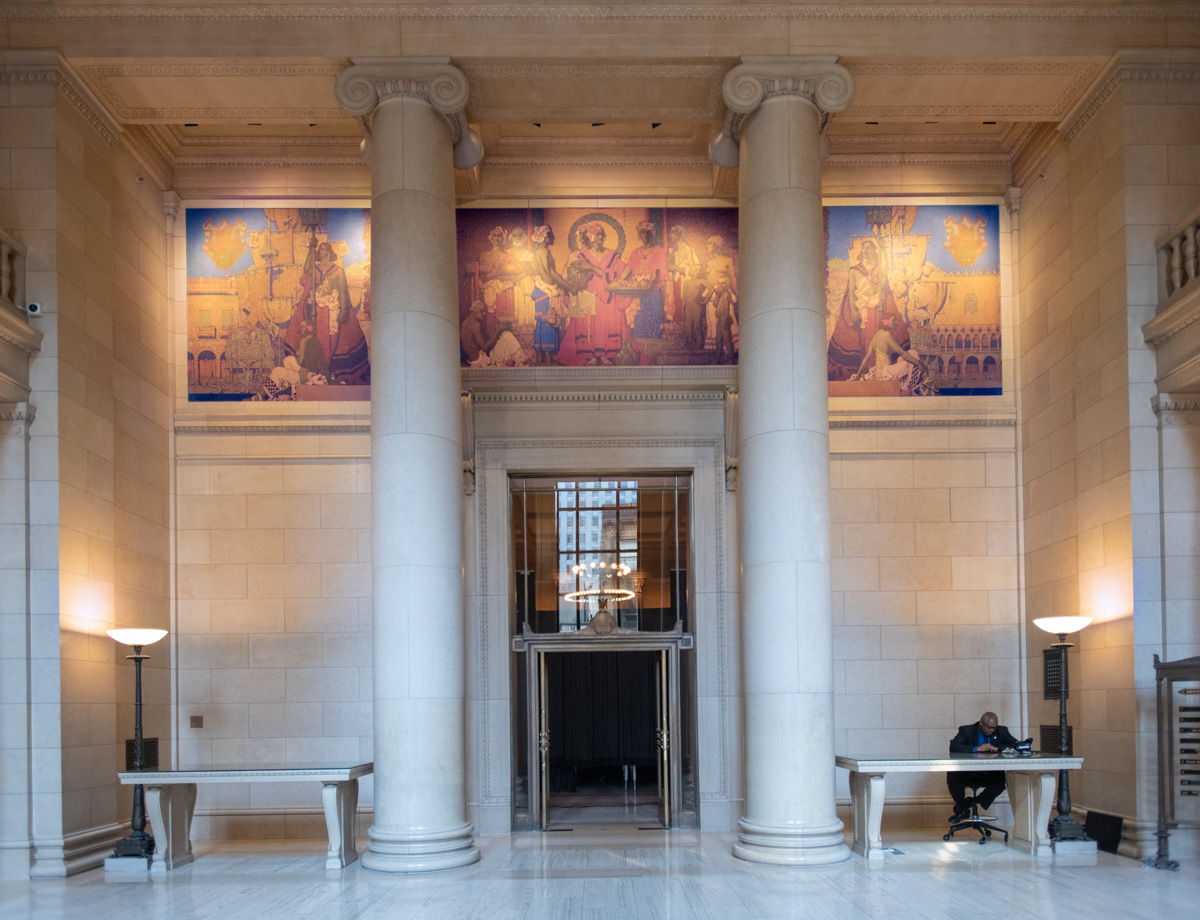
Lobby of the Bently Reserve

Currently, the building's upper floors are leased to notable tenants such as Smith Group, the Bar Association of San Francisco, and the Energy Foundation. Since purchasing the building in 2005, Bently Holdings owner Christopher Bently has cultivated a green environment by requiring all new tenants to design their office space at a minimum of LEED Silver Certified. One of these tenants, the Energy Foundation, became the first commercial space in San Francisco — and one of only thirteen worldwide — to receive LEED-CI Platinum Certification from the US Green Building Council.

Other technologies such as high-definition audio, on-demand video capture, digital videoconferencing, and high-speed Wi-Fi are available throughout the Bently Reserve. A highly secure fiber optic network is routed throughout the building for a completely segregated and secure network for both tenants and events.

The lower floors of the Bently Reserve are still rented for special events, business meetings, and conferences. These spaces are branded as one of San Francisco's green special event venues, featuring a preferred list of eco-friendly third party vendors and caterers.

Two ships, the Apollo storeship and the Niantic storeship, that were scuttled during the California Gold Rush, still lie beneath the foundations of the Reserve. Two of the building's meeting rooms are named after these vessels.

== See also ==
- Federal Reserve System
- List of San Francisco Designated Landmarks
