= Edward L. Burlingame =

American writer and editor

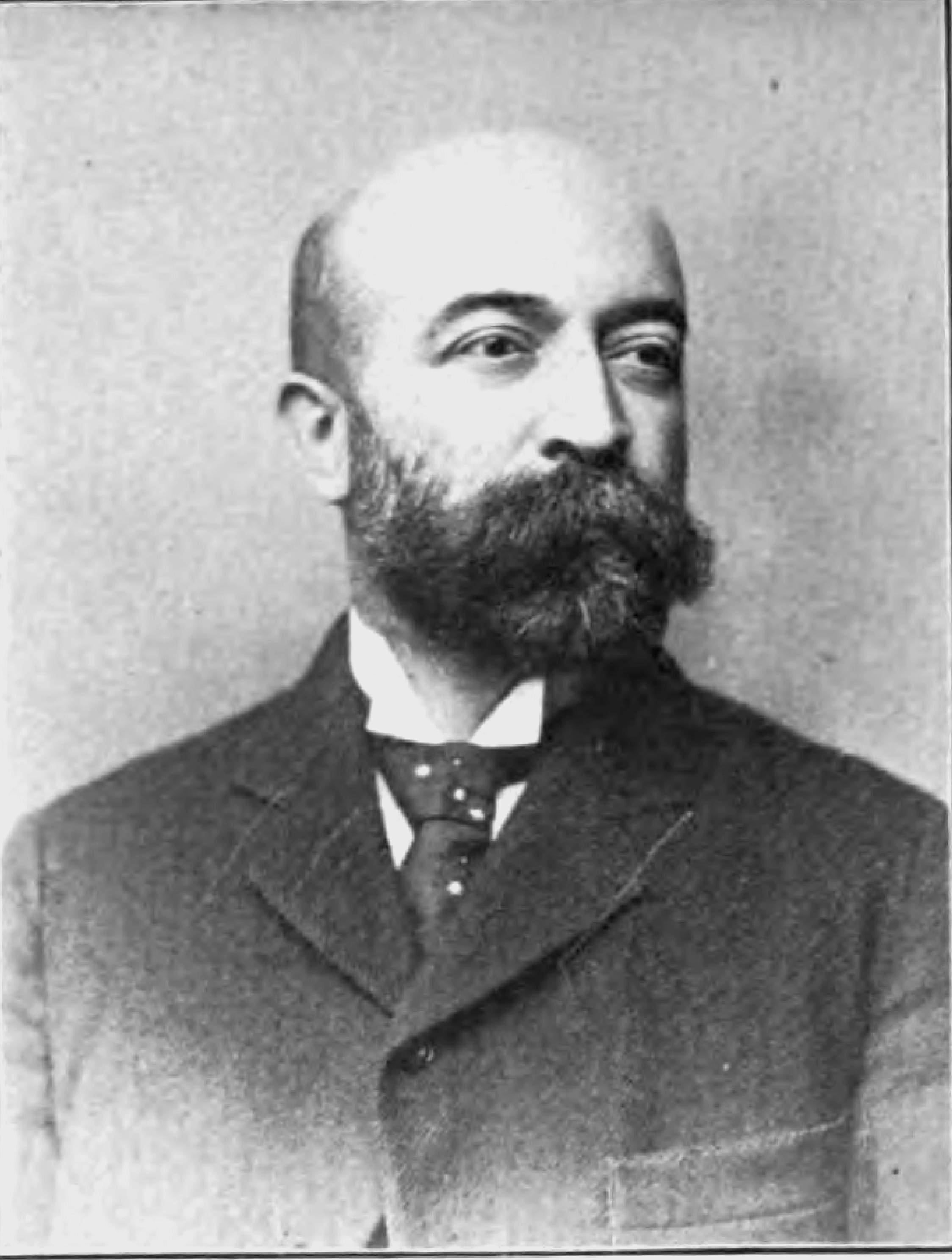
- Born: May 30, 1848
- Died: November 15, 1922 (aged 74)
- Alma mater: Harvard University; Heidelberg University

Edward Livermore Burlingame (May 30, 1848, Boston – November 15, 1922, New York City) was an American writer and editor.

== Biography ==
He entered Harvard, but left before graduation to accompany his father, Anson Burlingame, to China as his private secretary. He studied at the University of Heidelberg, Germany, in 1867-1869, taking the degree of Ph.D., and afterward studied at Berlin. He traveled extensively in Japan and China in 1866, and afterward in Europe.

He was on the editorial staff of the New York Tribune in 1871, and on that for the revision of the American Cyclopaedia in 1872-1876. He was a contributor to periodical literature, and associated in the preparation of several histories and other works. In 1879, he became connected editorially with the publishing house of Charles Scribner's Sons, New York. In 1886, he was appointed founding editor-in-chief of Scribner's Magazine, where he served until his resignation in 1914. After 1914, he was a general editorial adviser to Scribner's.

== Works ==
He translated and edited Art, Life and Theories of Richard Wagner (New York, 1875).
