= Munn =

Munn is a surname.

- Abraham Munn (1818–1910), Founder of Lakeland, Florida
- Albert Edward Munn (1865–1946), Canadian politician
- Allison Munn (born 1974), American actress
- Angus Munn (1938–2003), Canadian soldier
- Biggie Munn (1908–1975), American football player and coach
- Bill Munn (1911–1989), Australian rules footballer
- Billy Munn (1911–2000), British jazz pianist and arranger
- Bob Munn (1939–2023), Australian rules footballer
- Carrie Munn (1898–1984), American fashion designer
- Charles Munn (politician) (1887–1973), American politician
- Charles Allen Munn (1859–1924), American editor and publisher
- Charles A. Munn III (born 1954), American conservation biologist
- Courteney Munn (born 1998), Australian rules football player
- Duncan Munn (born 2003), Scottish rugby union player
- E. Harold Munn (1903–1992), American politician
- Eric Munn (1903–1968), Canadian Anglican bishop
- Ernest Glenn Munn, US Army Air Force officer
- Geoffrey Munn (born 1953), British jewellery specialist
- Gurnee Munn (1887–1960), American veteran and businessman
- H. Warner Munn (1903–1981), American novelist
- Henry Munn (1835–1864), English cricketer and British Army officer
- Horatio Munn (1851–1910), American baseball player
- Jack Munn (1921–1993), Australian rugby league footballer
- Jason Munn, American graphic artist
- Jeff Munn (born 1901), American public address announcer
- John Munn (Manitoba politician) (1882–1942), Canadian politician
- John Munn (Newfoundland politician) (1807–1879), Newfoundland politician
- John Munn (shipbuilder) (1788–1859), Canadian politician
- John C. Munn (1906–1986), United States Marine Corps general
- John Shannon Munn (1880–1918), Newfoundland businessman
- Kathleen Munn (1887–1974), Canadian modern painter
- Keble Munn (1920–2008), Jamaican politician and agriculturalist
- Louise Munn (born 1983), Scottish hockey player
- Lyle Munn (1893–1939), American football player
- Mancel Thornton Munn (1887–1956), American botanist and agronomist
- Mark Munn (born 1953), American ancient Greek historian
- Mason Munn (born 2006), Northern Irish footballer
- Matthew J. Munn (born 1980), American actor
- Meg Munn (born 1959), British Labour Co-op politician
- Michael Munn (c. 1952 – 2022), British author and film historian
- Mike Munn (born 1959), Canadian film and television editor
- Nancy Munn (1931–2020), American anthropologist
- Olivia Munn (born 1980), American actress
- Orson Desaix Munn (1824–1907), Publisher of the Scientific American
- Orson Desaix Munn II (1883–1958), American editor and publisher
- Pamela Munn, British academic researcher
- Paul Sandby Munn (1773–1845), English watercolour painter
- R. E. Munn (1919–2013), Canadian climatologist and meteorologist
- Ralph Munn (1894–1975), American librarian
- Reginald Munn (1869–1947), English army officer and cricketer
- Robert Munn (rower) (born 1990), American rower
- Robert Stewart Munn (1829–1894), Scottish-born merchant and politician in Newfoundland
- Scott Munn (born 1970), American rower
- Scott Munn (football executive) (born 1974), Australian businessman
- Simon Munn (born 1968), British wheelchair basketball player
- Stuart Munn (1872–1959), Scottish footballer
- Wayne Munn (1896–1931), American professional wrestler and football player
- Willie Munn (born 1934), Scottish footballer

== See also ==
- Munn (disambiguation)
