= Elise Andrew =

British blogger and science communicator

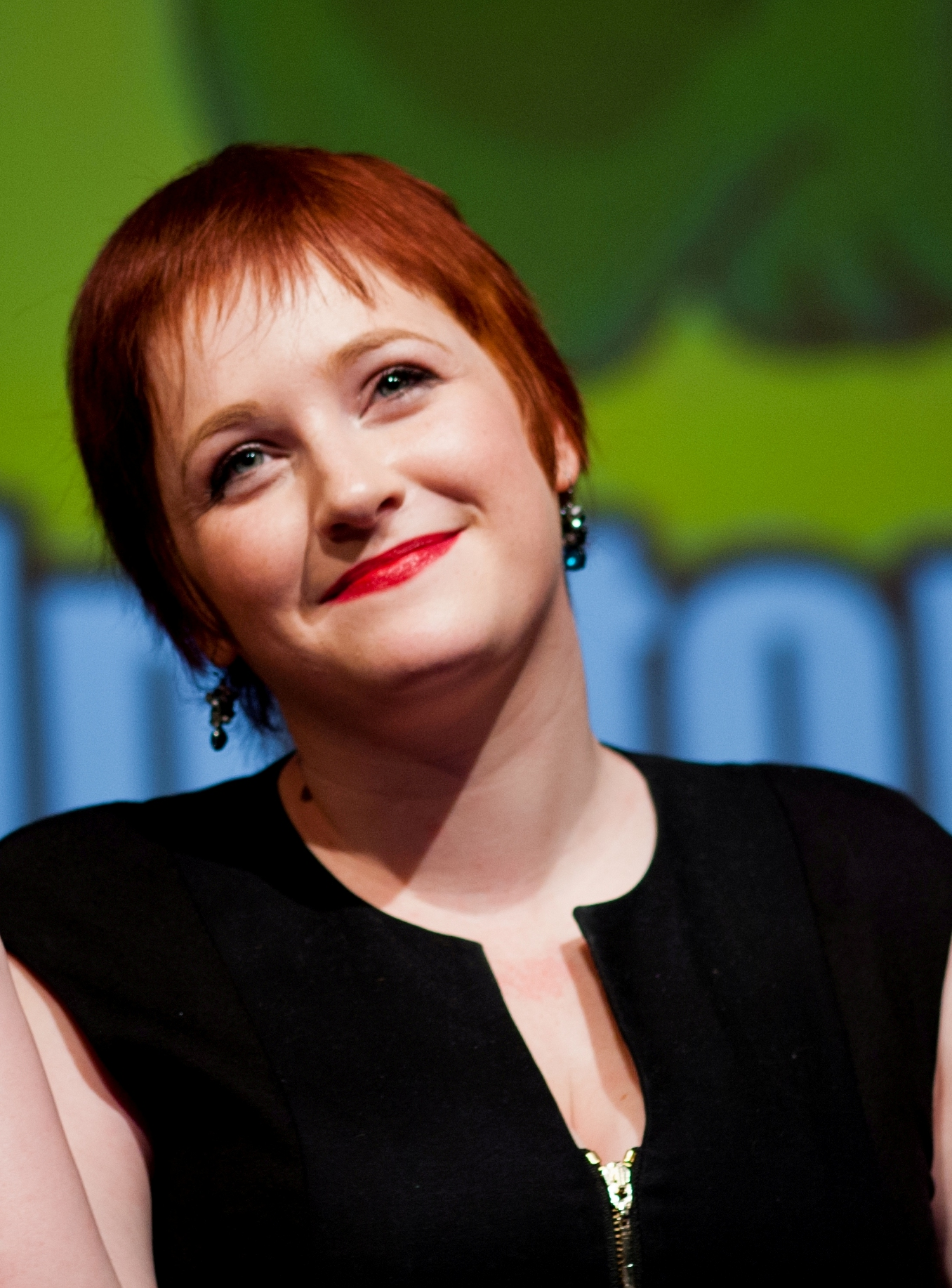
- Andrew in 2013
- Born: 1989 (age 36–37)
- Education: University of Sheffield (B.Sc.)
- Occupations: Blog writer, science communicator and webmaster
- Known for: Founder of the website and Facebook page IFLScience

Elise Andrew (born 1989) is a British blogger. She was the CEO and founder of IFLScience, a website and Facebook page on popular science. With regard to the site, Andrew has come under criticism for plagiarism, unlicensed use of intellectual property, reporting false and misleading information, and rarely issuing corrections.

The IFLS website was purchased by LabX Media Group in 2020.

== Early life and education ==
Andrew was raised in Long Melford, Suffolk, United Kingdom (UK). Andrew graduated from the University of Sheffield in 2012 with a Bachelor of Science in biology. Her undergraduate degree covered subjects such as ecology, animal sciences and evolution.

== Career ==
=== IFL Science ===
Andrew started the Facebook page I Fucking Love Science in March 2012, saying of the creation that "I was always finding bizarre facts and cool pictures and one day I decided to create somewhere to put them – it was never supposed to be more than me posting to a few dozen of my friends."

After the first day, the page had over 1,000 likes and passed 1 million likes in September 2012. Andrew stated that this work ultimately led to LabX Media Group hiring her as a social media content manager that same year.

On 23 April 2013, Scientific American photographer Alex Wild saw that Andrew had used one of his insect photographs without attribution or permission. He began researching the page, and discovered that 59 of the 100 most recent photographs used by Andrew were not credited to the original source. Wild noted that Andrew "is using [other artists' work] to drive traffic on the IFLS page where it helps sell her own t-shirts." Ultimately, he accused Andrew of infringing the copyright of his photographs and artwork for her Facebook page without requesting permission from the copyright holders.

Similarly, after complaining to Facebook about the uncredited use of his infographics on the IFLS page, prominent scientist and science communicator Hashem Al-Ghaili claims to have been told by Facebook that IFLS was the subject of over 6,000 copyright complaints.

In 2014, an article by MIT's Knight Science Journalism, a program which seeks to "advance science journalism in the public interest", found that content appearing on IFLS was "error-prone" and that false and misleading statements remained even after editorial staff were alerted of the issues. The article ultimately asserted that when mistakes are pointed out "they are rarely corrected".

Comedian Craig Ferguson announced at the 2014 SXSW festival in Austin, Texas that he would be collaborating with the Science Channel and Andrew on an IFLS television program. Ferguson was meant to serve as the show's executive producer; however, plans never came to fruition, and the series was canceled.

By January 2015, the page's Facebook had risen to 19.5 million likes. Later that year, in July 2015, astrophysicist and science communicator Brian Koberlein stated that, due to its misleading articles and refusal to issue corrections, IFLS was guilty of "the willful promotion of ignorance".

In 2016 Time magazine noted that Andrew was frequently accused of "oversimplifying complex issues and promoting stories...that wind up getting debunked." In response, Andrew stated that she was "not trying to teach people about science". Later that year, an article in New York magazine's blog Intelligencer noted that IFLS posted misleading information and was not a credible science site.

In May 2020, Andrew renamed the company from "I Fucking Love Science" to "IFLScience", citing the swear word's incompatibility with Facebook's monetization systems, and saying that "much as I love the name, I love my staff more". The IFLS website was purchased by LabX Media Group in September 2020.

=== Other work ===
In August 2013, Andrew collaborated with Discovery Communications to create an online video series. The first segment appeared at Discovery's TestTube network. Episodes were also made available at the IFLS page on YouTube. The series was canceled that same year.

During her time at IFLS, Andrew spoke at a number of conferences, including a conference series in Australia dedicated to IFLS, a science communication program at MIT Museum, a science-culture conference in Chile, and the World Congress of Science and Factual Producers in Montreal. Andrew was also a speaker at the Scientista Foundation and appeared at a science and skepticism conference hosted by the New England Skeptical Society.

In 2015, Andrew was listed as one of Forbes' "30 to watch under 30" in their "media" category. In June 2015, Andrew was presented with the Stamford Raffles Award for distinguished contributions to zoology by amateur zoologists or for activities outside normal professional undertakings, by the Zoological Society of London. Andrew was listed in Time's "30 most influential people on the internet" in 2016.

== Personal life ==
Andrew lives and works in Midland, Ontario, Canada. On 13 September 2013, she married her fiancé Jake Rivett; she has stated that she will wait "a long time" to have children.
