= Derek Muller =

Science communicator (born 1982)

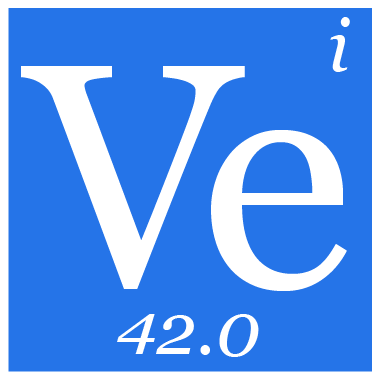
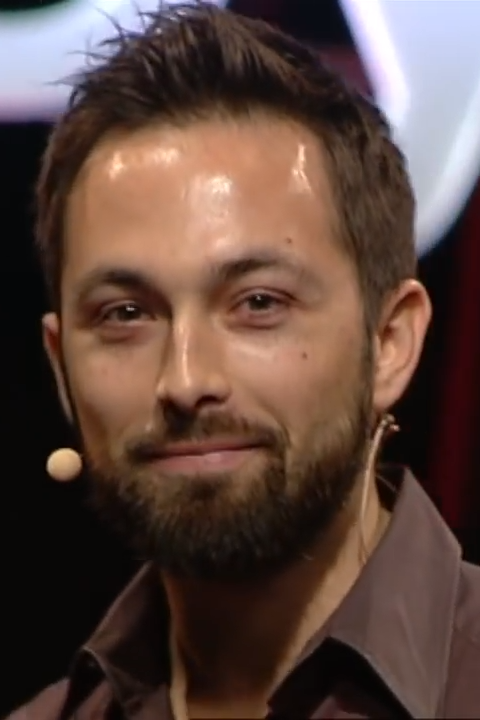
- Veritasium YouTube channel logo Derek Muller at TED@Sydney, 2012
- Born: Derek Alexander Muller; 9 November 1982 (age 44); Traralgon, Victoria, Australia
- Education: Queen's University at Kingston (BASc); University of Sydney (PhD)
- Occupation: Science communicator
- Years active: 2010–present
- Television: Ancient Impossible, Catalyst, Bill Nye Saves the World, Uranium – Twisting the Dragon's Tail, Vitamania
- Spouse: Raquel Nuno

YouTube information
- Channels: Veritasium; 2veritasium; Sciencium
- Years active: 2010–present
- Genres: Science, education
- Subscribers: 21.4 million (Veritasium); 563 thousand (2veritasium); 322 thousand (Sciencium)
- Views: 4.67 billion (Veritasium); 23.4 million (2veritasium); 7.04 million (Sciencium)
- Last updated: 1 September 2026
- Website: veritasium.com

Derek Alexander Muller (born 9 November 1982) is a Canadian-Australian science communicator and media personality best known for his YouTube channel Veritasium, which has over 21.4 million subscribers and 4.75 billion views as of November 2026.

== Early life and education ==
Muller was born to South African parents in Traralgon, Victoria, Australia. His family moved to Vancouver, Canada, when he was 18 months old. In 2000, Muller graduated from West Vancouver Secondary School. In 2004, Muller graduated from Queen's University in Kingston, Ontario, with a Bachelor of Applied Science in engineering physics.

Muller moved to Australia to study film-making; however, he instead enrolled for a PhD in physics education research from the University of Sydney, which he completed in 2008 with the thesis, Designing Effective Multimedia for Physics Education.

== Career ==
Muller has been listed as a team member of the ABC television program Catalyst since 2008. During his PhD program, he taught at a tutoring company, where he became the full-time Science Head after completing his PhD in 2008. He quit the job at the end of 2010. In 2011, Muller created his YouTube channel Veritasium, which became his main source of income within a few years. During his early days as a YouTuber, he often recorded videos while walking through neighborhoods, or hiking, discussing general topics with a scientific and educational perspective.

Since 2011, Muller has continued to appear on Catalyst, reporting scientific stories from around the globe, and on Australian television network Ten as the 'Why Guy' on the Breakfast program. In May 2012, he gave a TEDxSydney talk using the subject of his thesis. He presented the documentary Uranium – Twisting the Dragon's Tail, which aired in July–August 2015 on several public television stations around the world and won the Eureka Prize for Science Journalism.

On 21 September 2015, Muller hosted the Google Science Fair Awards Celebration for that year. Muller has also won the Australian Department of Innovation Nanotechnology Film Competition and the 2013 Australian Webstream Award for "Best Educational & Lifestyle Series". Starting in April 2017, he appeared as a correspondent on the Netflix series Bill Nye Saves the World.

Muller presented in the film Vitamania: The Sense and Nonsense of Vitamins, a documentary by Genepool Productions, released in August 2018. The film answers questions about vitamins and the use of dietary vitamin supplements. Muller's works have been featured in Scientific American, Wired, Gizmodo, and i09.

=== Veritasium and other YouTube channels ===
In January 2011, Muller created the educational science channel Veritasium on YouTube, the focus of which is "addressing counter-intuitive concepts in science, usually beginning by discussing ideas with members of the public". The videos range in style from interviews with experts, such as 2011 Physics Nobel Laureate Brian Schmidt, to science experiments, dramatisations, songs, and – a hallmark of the channel – interviews with the public to uncover misconceptions about science. The name Veritasium is a combination of the Latin word for truth, Veritas, and the suffix common to many chemical elements, -ium. This creates Veritasium, an "element of truth", a play on the popular phrase. In its logo, which has been a registered trade mark since 2016, the number "42.0" resembles an element on the periodic table. The number was chosen because it is "the Answer to the Ultimate Question of Life, the Universe, and Everything" in Douglas Adams's famous novel The Hitchhiker's Guide to the Galaxy.

In July 2012, Muller created a second YouTube channel, 2veritasium. Muller used the new platform to produce editorial videos that discuss such topics as filmmaking, showcasing behind-the-scenes footage, and for viewer reactions to popular Veritasium videos. In 2017, Muller began uploading videos on his newest channel, Sciencium, which is dedicated to videos on recent and historical discoveries in science. In 2021, Muller hosted Pindrop, a YouTube Original series exploring unusual places around the world, as seen from Google Earth. Only one episode exploring potash evaporation ponds in Utah was released before YouTube cancelled all original production in 2022. As of 21 April 2023, Veritasium is majority-owned by the private equity media company Electrify Video Partners.

==== Reception ====
Veritasium videos have received critical acclaim.

Two early successful Veritasium videos demonstrate the physics of a falling Slinky toy. (Note: The "slinky" videos explain the following: When a slinky is held dangling vertically and then released, it can be observed in slow motion that the bottom end does not begin to move until the entire slinky has collapsed, making it look as if the slinky was defying gravity (i.e., floating). This counter-intuitive phenomenon inspired a wealth of media coverage, including the Toronto Star, NPR, and a segment on the BBC show QI. Muller also created a segment on the topic for the Australian Broadcasting Corporation show Catalyst.) At the 2012 Science Online conference, the video "Mission Possible: Graphene" won the Cyberscreen Science Film Festival, and was therefore featured on Scientific American as the video of the week. A video debunking the common misconception that the moon is closer than it is, was picked up by CBS News.

After a video was posted in which Muller is shown driving a wind-powered car, equipped with a huge spinning propeller, faster than the wind, UCLA physics professor Alexander Kusenko disagreed with the claim that sailing downwind faster than wind was possible within the laws of physics, and made a $10,000 bet with Muller that he could not demonstrate that the apparent greater speed was not due to other, incidental factors. Muller took up the bet, and the signing of a wager agreement by the parties was witnessed by Bill Nye and Neil deGrasse Tyson. In a subsequent video, Muller demonstrated the effect with a model cart under conditions ruling out extraneous effects, but Muller did admit he could have done a better job at explaining the phenomenon in the first video. Kusenko conceded the bet of $10,000, which was given away as prizes for a science communication competition.

In May 2025, the video on PFAS, named How One Company Secretly Poisoned The Planet, was awarded the 2025 AAAS Kavli Science Journalism Gold Award.

== Personal life and family ==
After Muller's parents, Anthony and Shirley, married in South Africa, they moved to Vancouver, where his two sisters, Kirstie and Marilouise, were born. The family moved to Australia, Derek's birthplace, after his father got a job in Traralgon at a pulp and paper mill, and returned to Canada when Muller was 18 months old. He was educated in Vancouver and Kingston.

After Muller moved to Los Angeles, he met Raquel Nuno, a planetary science PhD student, whom he married in November 2025. They have four children, and live "nomadic lives", moving to Portugal in 2025.

== Awards and nominations ==
- First prize, Science Online Cyberscreen Science Film Festival (2012)
- Australian Webstream Awards for Best Educational & Lifestyle Series (2013)
- Sigma Xi Honorary Member (2014)
- Eureka Prize for Science Journalism (2016)
- Richtmyer Memorial Lecture Award for outstanding contributions to physics and effectively communicating those contributions to physics educators (2016)
- Australian Department of Innovation Nanotechnology film competition
- Streamy Award (2017) for "Best Science and Education Channel, Show, or Series"
