= George Washington (Trumbull) =

1780 painting by John Trumbull

- George Washington and William Lee
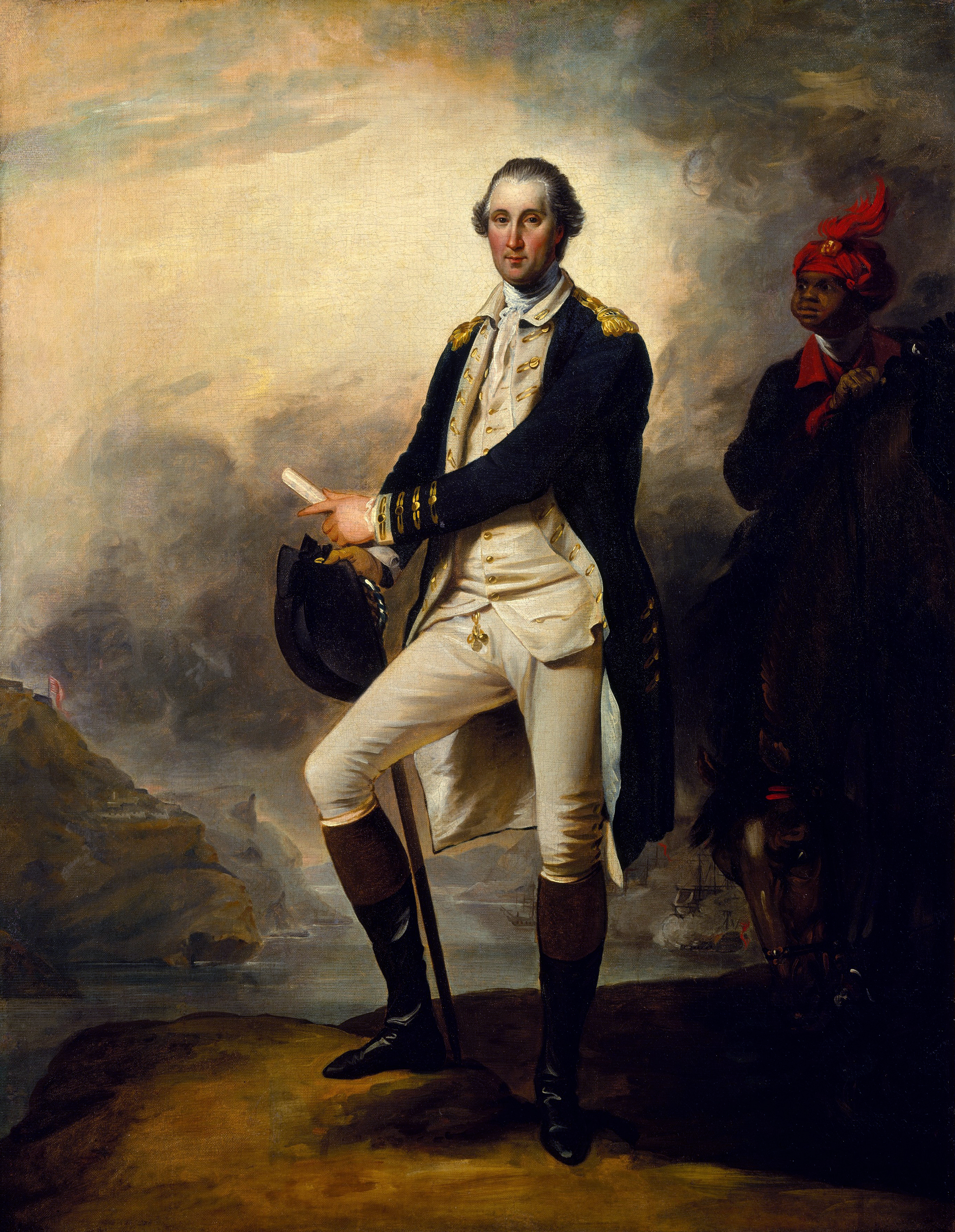
- Artist: John Trumbull
- Year: 1780
- Medium: Oil on canvas
- Dimensions: 91.4 cm × 71.1 cm (36 in × 28 in)
- Location: Metropolitan Museum of Art, New York City

George Washington, also entitled George Washington and William Lee, is a full-length portrait in oil painted in 1780 by the American artist John Trumbull during the American Revolutionary War. General George Washington stands near his enslaved servant William Lee, overlooking the Hudson River in New York, with West Point and ships in the background. Trumbull, who once served as an aide-de-camp to Washington, painted the picture from memory while studying under Benjamin West in London. He finished it before his arrest for high treason in November. The portrait, measuring 36 in × 28 in (0.91 m × 0.71 m), is on view at the Metropolitan Museum of Art in New York City. Originally in the possession of the de Neufville family of the Netherlands, it was bequeathed to the museum by Charles Allen Munn in 1924.

== History ==
Trumbull served in the Continental Army as a second aide-de-camp to General Washington from July 27 to August 15, 1775. Later commissioned colonel, he resigned due to a dispute over his service time on February 22, 1777. After that, he resumed his career as a painter in Boston. In May 1780, he travelled to Nantes, France for business, but after this was unsuccessful, he went to London in July to study painting under Benjamin West. West's first question was whether Trumbull had brought any of his paintings to show his skill. Since he had no examples, he began by copying gallery paintings. Subsequently, Trumbull painted this portrait of Washington from memory and probably gave it to Leendert de Neufville, son of Jean de Neufville.

On November 15, 1780, news of the treason of Benedict Arnold and the death of Major John André reached London. On November 20, Trumbull was arrested for high treason and then imprisoned at Tothill Fields Bridewell. Nearly seven months later, on June 12, 1781, he was released and ordered to leave the country within thirty days. On July 13, by then in Amsterdam, he wrote to his father that he was staying at the home of de Neufville. On July 20, he wrote of his plans to return home aboard the frigate South Carolina, commanded by Commodore Alexander Gillon. The voyage lasted six months, arriving at Boston in January 1782.

The painting remained in the possession of the de Neufville family until 1890. It was sold through art dealers in London, and acquired by the New York art dealer Edward G. Kennedy before 1898. By 1908, the painting was in the collection of Charles Allen Munn, who bequeathed it to the Metropolitan Museum of Art in 1924.

== Description ==
Washington, in full military uniform, a blue coat over buff waistcoat and pants, is shown brightly lit in the center of a landscape, standing on a hill overlooking the Hudson River in New York. In the background, West Point is visible on the left, with a red and white striped banner flying, perhaps the First Navy Jack. Washington holds a hat, sword, and scrolled document. A red turbaned Black servant, usually identified as William "Billy" Lee, attends Washington's horse in the right foreground. Smoke rises from ships on the river in the lower right background.

The likeness of Washington may be influenced by Charles Willson Peale's c. 1776 portrait of Washington, which Trumbull had copied in Boston in 1778, and which is now in the Brooklyn Museum. The composition shows influences from other paintings of military men with a groom and horse, back to Anthony van Dyck's c. 1635 painting Charles I at the Hunt. Some aspects, such as the reinforcement of outlines with black, echo the techniques of Benjamin West.

== Other versions ==
British engraver and print publisher, Valentine Green, created a mezzotint version entitled General Washington. It was published by appointment of de Neufville, January 15, 1781. The legend includes a cartouche at the bottom showing a Native American holding the Washington family crest. In 1783, he created a half-length portrait, also entitled General Washington. In 1782, Jacques Le Roy engraved a version entitled G. Washington, with the image reversed.

== Critical reception ==
Munn in his book, Three Types of Washington Portraits, states:

The popularity of the portrait was very great. It was the first authentic portrait of Washington that had been published in Europe, and copies of it were soon issued in France and elsewhere.

In the Yale University Art Gallery catalogue, John Trumbull: The Hand and Spirit of a Painter, the portrait is described:

Although still careful and restrained, the execution here is looser, recession in space more convincing, and the wooden quality observable in the faces of his earlier sitters has given way to a softer modeling.

== Gallery ==
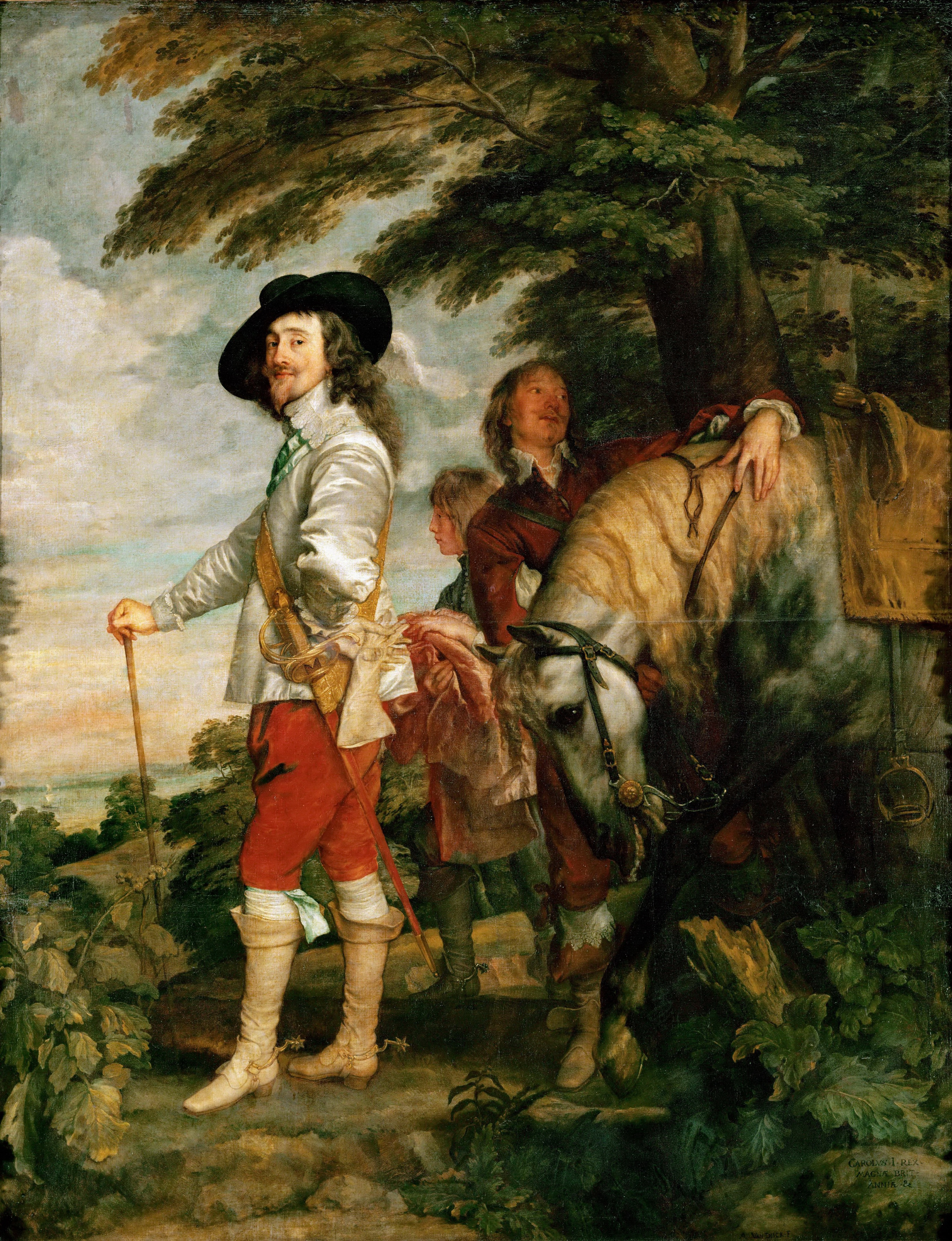
Charles I at the Hunt, Anthony van Dyck, c. 1635, Louvre

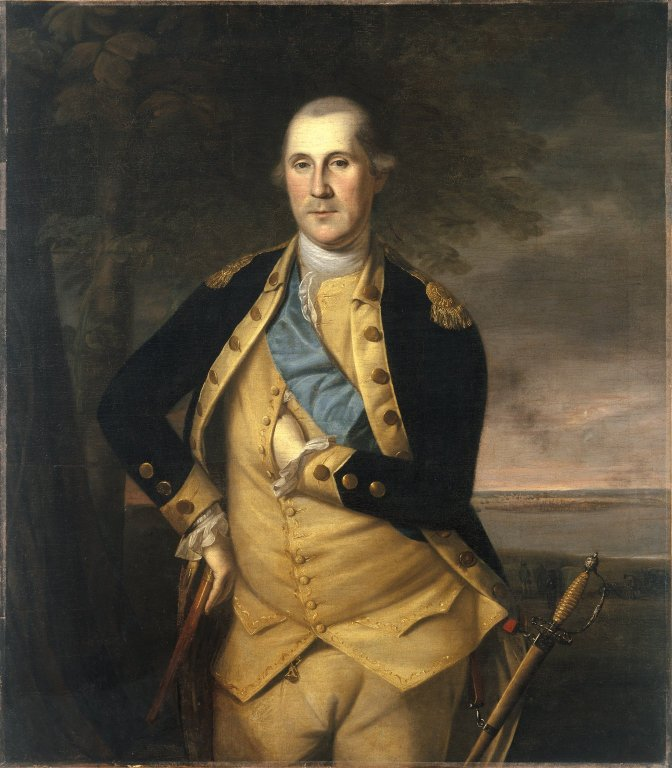
George Washington, Charles Willson Peale, c. 1776, Brooklyn Museum

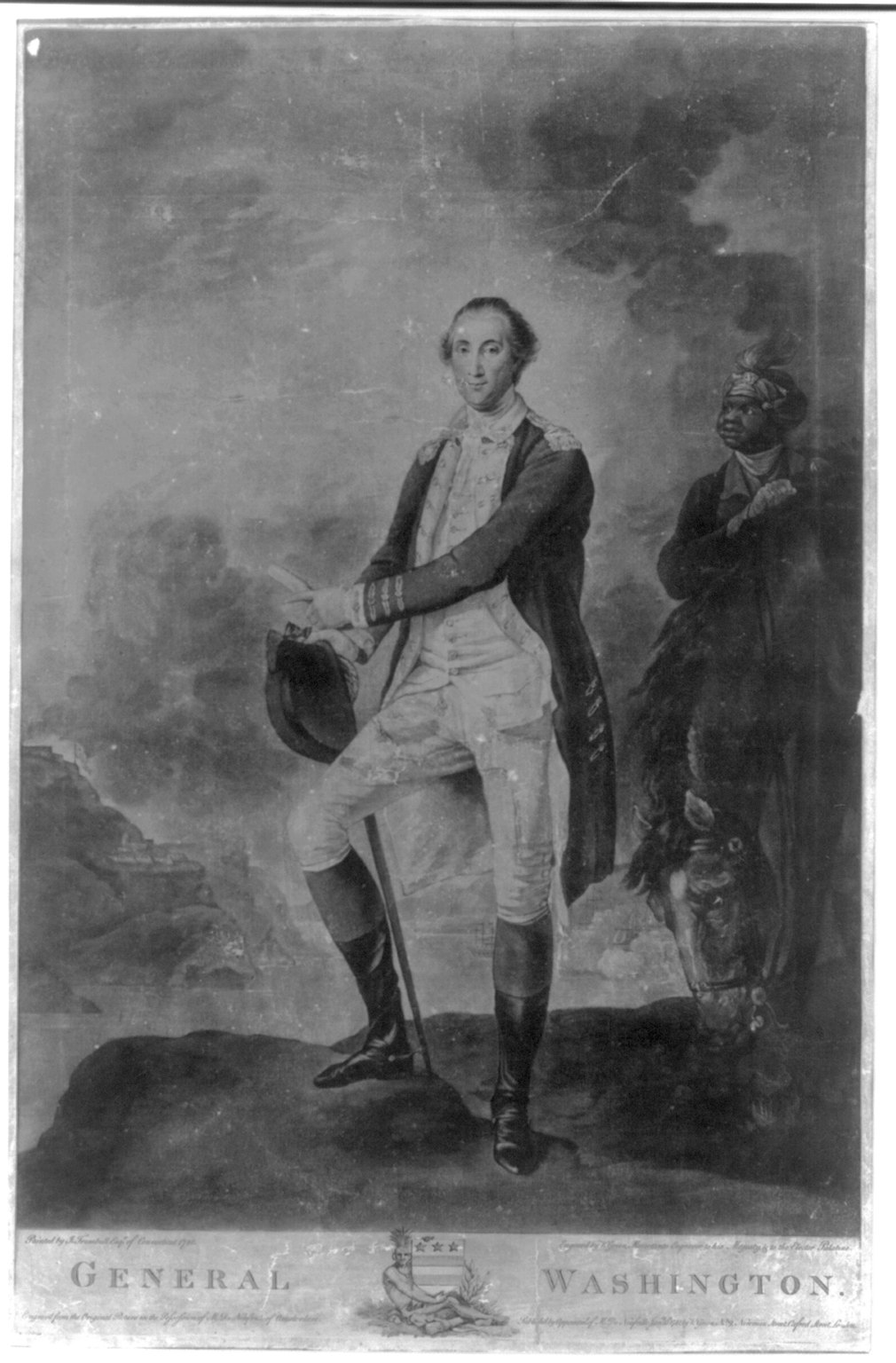
General Washington, engraving by Valentine Green, 1781

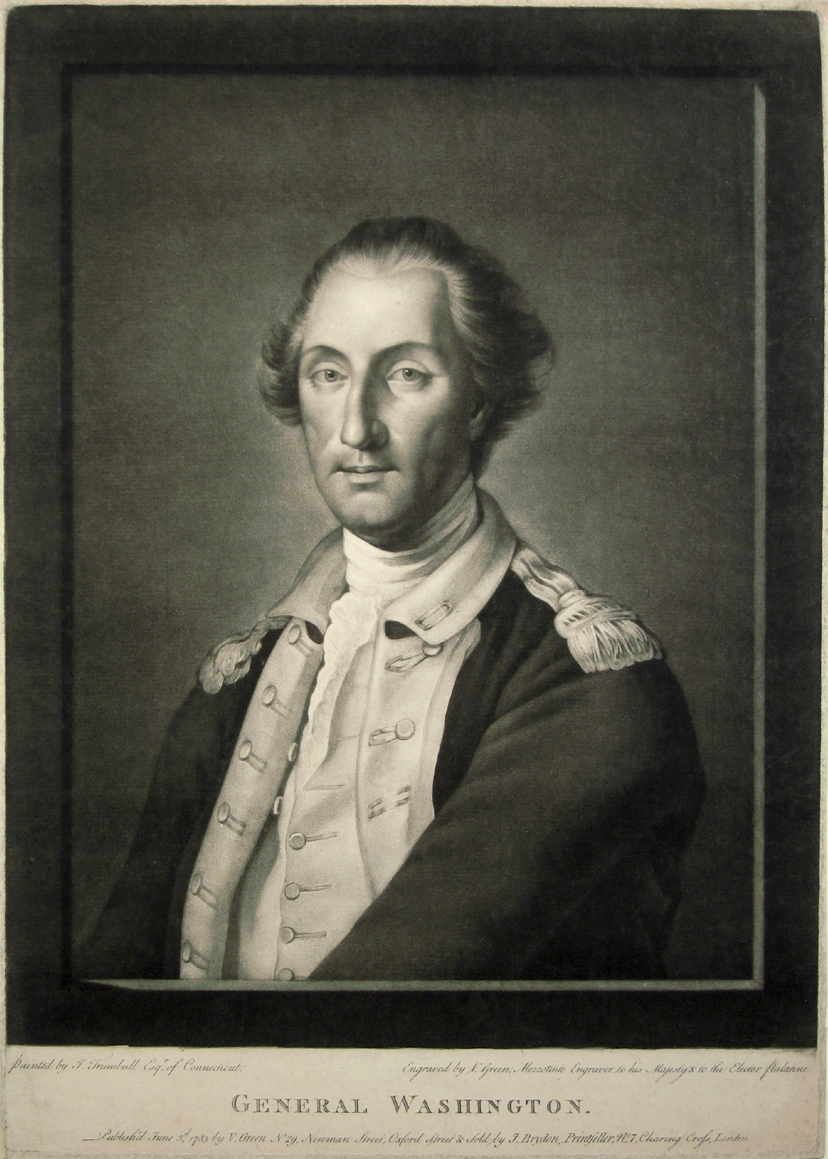
General Washington, engraving by Valentine Green, 1783

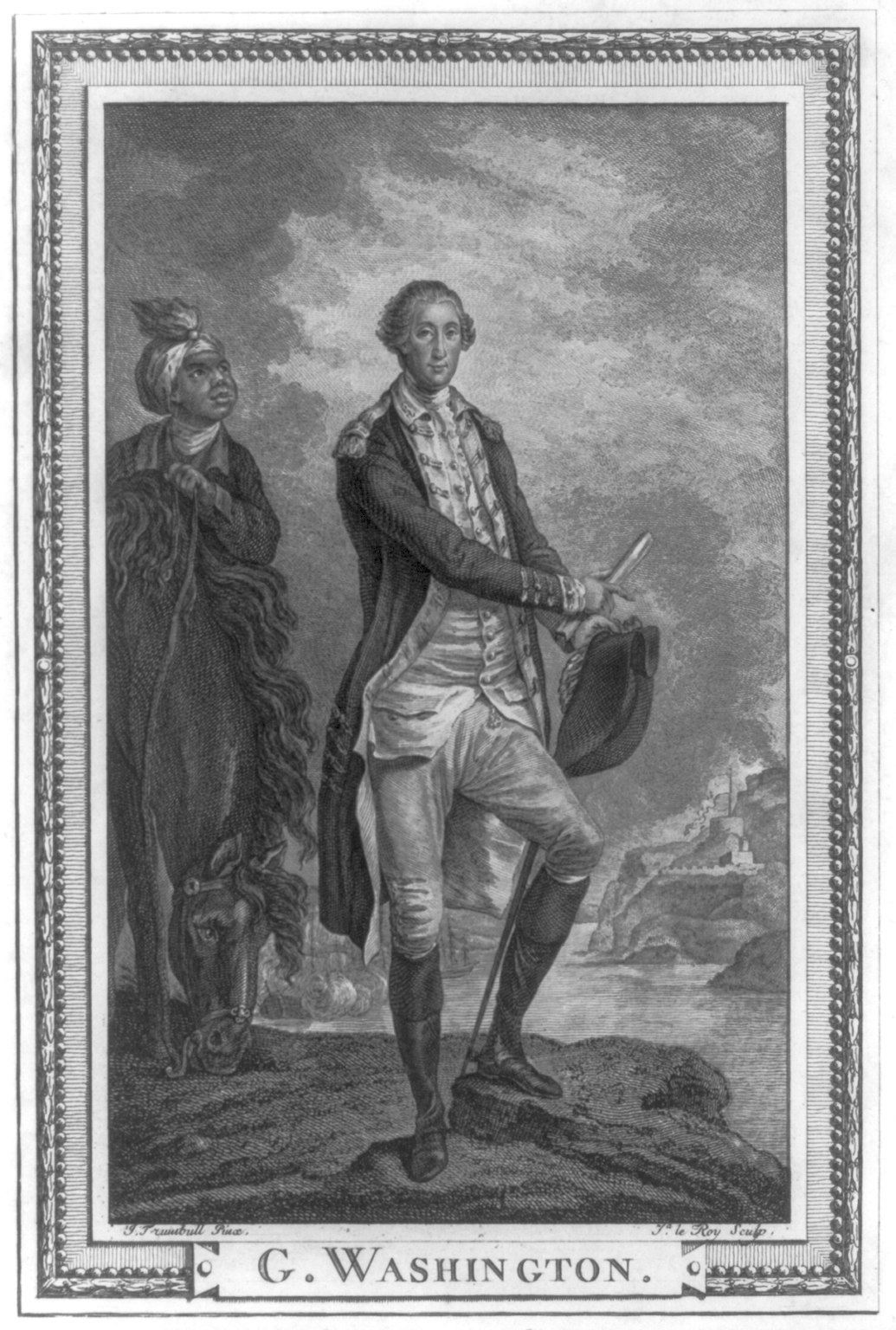
G. Washington, engraving by Jacques Le Roy, 1782

== Legacy ==
A seven-cent postage stamp of Washington based on this painting, printed using black ink, was issued as part of the Washington Bicentennial stamps of 1932 by the United States Post Office. In 1925, the painting was featured on page one of The Metropolitan Museum of Art Bulletin, and described in the article "The Charles Allen Munn Bequest".

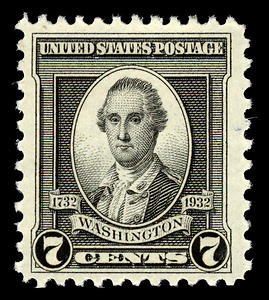
7¢ Issue of 1932

== See also ==
- List of paintings of George Washington
- 1780 in art
- George Washington and slavery
