= Munn (disambiguation) =

Munn is surname.

Munn may also refer to:

== Places ==
- Munn Ice Arena, a hockey arena in Michigan, United States
- Munn Lake in Thurston County, Washington, United States
- Munn Park Historic District in Florida, United States
- Munn Run, a stream in Scioto County, Ohio, United States

== Other ==
- Munn Ware (1909–1970), American jazz trombonist
- Munn semigroup, an inverse semigroup of isomorphisms between principal ideals of a semilattice
- Munn v. Illinois, 1877 United States Supreme Court case
