= LabX Media Group =

Media and technology company

- Logo
- Industry: Media; Technology
- Founded: 1995; 31 years ago
- Headquarters: Ontario, Canada
- Website: labxmediagroup.com

LabX Media Group is a media and technology company based in Ontario, Canada, that is focused on the biological research community. Founded in 1995 as an online marketplace for laboratory equipment, it has grown through various acquisitions to now have a presence in publishing and laboratory services.

== Brands ==
1DegreeBio, an online marketplace for life sciences products, was founded in 2009 as an independent company, but was acquired by LabX Media Group in 2016.

LabWrench.com, an online forum for discussing laboratory equipment, was started by LabX Media Group in 2010 and is now partially integrated into the LabX marketplace.

Lab Manager Magazine (acquired in 2008) is a trade journal for research lab managers. The Scientist (acquired in 2011) is a professional magazine targeted towards life science researchers, with articles on current biology research.

In 2016, LabX Media Group acquired UK-based Technology Networks, another trade journal targeted towards research scientists. In 2020, LabX Media Group acquired IFLScience, a popular science website founded by Elise Andrew.

In 2024, LabX Media acquired Discover magazine from Kalmbach Media. In 2026, LabX Media acquired Scientific American from Springer Nature.
