= Uranium – Twisting the Dragon's Tail =

Australian television documentary series

- Written by: Wain Fimeri; Steve Westh
- Directed by: Wain Fimeri
- Starring: Derek Muller
- Music by: Dale Cornelius
- Country of origin: Australia

Production
- Producers: Harry Panagiotidis; Kate Pappas; Sonya Pemberton; Josephine Wright
- Cinematography: Jaems Grant
- Editors: Alex Archer; Wayne Hyett
- Running time: 162 minutes
- Production company: Gene Pool Productions

Original release
- Network: PBS
- Release: 29 July 2015
- Network: SBS
- Release: 20 August 2015

Uranium – Twisting the Dragon's Tail is a television documentary series about uranium, its history, and its uses. It was produced by Gene Pool Productions for PBS and SBS and premiered on both networks in late July and August 2015.

The series was conceived, created, written and directed by Wain Fimeri, was shot in nine countries and is presented by Derek Muller.

== Episodes ==
=== Part 1: The Rock that Became a Bomb ===
Derek Muller introduces uranium and its use throughout history. Uranium, originally sourced from pitchblende, became the subject of intense scientific study. Using computer-generated dragons as a metaphor for daughter isotopes, the episode shows how uranium turns into lead in the process of radioactive decay. The harmful effects of radiation from radium, which is produced during the decay of uranium, are discussed. Derek shows what the first atom bomb looked like. The episode concludes with the use of uranium as a nuclear weapon and the bombing of Hiroshima at the end of World War II.

=== Part 2: The Rock that Changed the World ===
The use of uranium at the conclusion of World War II ushered in the Atomic Age. Uranium has since been utilized as a source of energy as well as in cancer treatment. Derek Muller visits Chernobyl and Fukushima, where major nuclear disasters have occurred. The proposition that in our energy-hungry, warming world, uranium both tempts with unbelievable power and threatens all life on earth is explored.

=== Part 3: The Rock in Our Future ===
The third episode, which was aired in Australia only, presents uranium as part of the mythology of indigenous peoples of Northern Australia, who say that a great creation spirit sleeps underground, and disturbing it will unleash disaster. This segues into the discussion of uranium mining in Australia.

== Premiere ==
The series premiered on 6 August 2015, the 70th anniversary of the bombing of Hiroshima, Japan. The SBS premiere in Australia occurred during a year-long inquiry into the possible expansion of nuclear industrialization in South Australia. The inquiry is known as the Nuclear Fuel Cycle Royal Commission. A period for public submissions to the Commission closed in the week prior to the screening of the series.

== Development and production ==
The series is produced by Sonya Pemberton and presented by Derek Muller. It is written and directed by Wain Fimeri. Sonya Pemberton began working with Cordell Jigsaw Productions under the new name Gene Pool Productions in September 2011. Previous Gene Pool productions have covered topics including palmistry, paternity, breasts, and vaccination.

The project was in produced over the course of 12 months in preparation for the seventieth anniversary of the detonation of Little Boy over Hiroshima, Japan and the beginning of the atomic age. The project received investment from Film Victoria in March 2014. The project's treatment and presenter were taken to the Sunny Side of the Doc film festival and marketplace in France in 2014. The production team pitched the project at the annual EBU Science & Knowledge Pitch and attracted ZDF/Arte (Germany/France) to join pre-existing broadcaster partners, PBS (USA) and SBS (Australia). The production has also been supported by Screen Australia.
