= Washington Bicentennial stamps of 1932 =

Postage stamps issued by the United States government in 1932

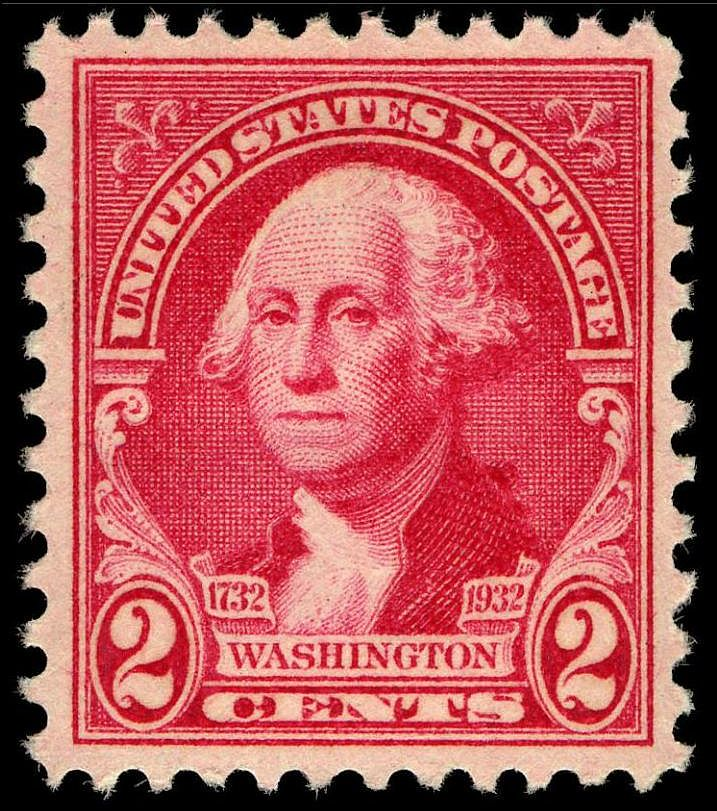
The 2c Washington Bicentennial stamp, 1932 issue This is one of a set of 12 stamps commemorating the 200th anniversary of George Washington, paid the common letter rate and was the most frequently used.

The Washington Bicentennial stamps of 1932 are postage stamps issued by the United States government in 1932 to commemorate the 200th anniversary of U.S. President George Washington's birth. Twelve stamps were issued as a collection, with each one depicting the President in a different period in his life.

The series was designed by Bureau of Engraving and Printing (BEP) designers Clair Aubrey Huston and Alvin Meissner. The ½¢ through 10¢ values present portraits of Washington derived from paintings, engravings or sculptures made during his lifetime. Huston designed seven stamps of the series: the ½¢, 1½¢, 2¢, 3¢, 6¢, 8¢ and 9¢ values; Meissner designed the remaining five.

The selections were made based on recommendations made by the Washington Bicentennial Commission, The United States Post Office Department and the BEP. The original concept called for not only picturing Washington but also featuring significant events, locations and iconic images of his life and after death. This was later modified to featuring only portraits.

The Post Office announced definite plans for the series in November 1930. These soon took on grandiose proportions, with the projected series comprising no fewer than eighteen stamps covering all values between ½¢ and $5. By comparison the largest commemorative set previously offered by the Post Office—the landmark Columbian Exposition issue of 1893—had consisted of sixteen stamps. (No other previous commemorative set had run to more than the nine values of the 1898 Trans-Mississippi series.) Indeed, the wide format of the Columbians was initially chosen for the Washington Bicentennial stamps and, like the Columbians, they were to survey their subject's entire career, presenting tableaux and portraits from all periods of Washington's life. In January 1931 a congressman went so far as to introduce a bill (never, however, enacted) proposing that during the whole of 1932 "all postage stamps offered for sale through the United States..., of whatever color or denomination, shall bear the portrait of George Washington." The numerous preparatory wide-format designs produced by the post office, including tableaux for 14¢, 17¢ and 25¢ denominations, were intended to be printed in two colors. Among the subjects depicted were Washington's tomb at Mount Vernon, Washington Crossing the Delaware, Washington's 1793 Inaugural, Washington's Home Life, Washington's Birthplace, Washington Resigning his Commission, a double portrait of George and Martha Washington, and the Washington Monument. Ultimately, however, the post office elected to avoid historical tableaux altogether, on the grounds that the public would expect these to replicate famous paintings rife with historical inaccuracies. Instead, the series would consist of single-width, single-color issues devoted exclusively to portraits, and would be reduced to twelve denominations ranging no higher than 10¢. A series of stamped envelopes showing Washington's home at Mount Vernon were also issued.

U.S. Washington Bicentennial Stamps (1932)
½¢- Scott #704 The likeness of Washington taken from a miniature painted by Charles Willson Peale in 1777, the original of which is in the Metropolitan Museum of Art. (87,969,700 issued)
1¢ - Scott #705 reproduction of the profile bust of Washington by Jean Antoine Houdon made in 1785 and now in Mount Vernon. (1,265,555,100 issued)
1½¢ - Scott #706 The likeness of Washington modeled from a painting known as the Virginia Colonel made at Mount Vernon in 1772 by Charles Willson Peale, the original of which is now in Washington and Lee University. (304,926,800 issued)
2¢ - Scott #707 The likeness of Washington by Gilbert Stuart from a painting made at Germantown, Pa., in 1796, known as the Atheneum portrait, the original of which is now in the Boston Museum of Fine Arts. (4,222,198,300 issued)
3¢ - Scott #708 The likeness of Washington in the uniform of a general with cocked hat reproduced from a portrait by Charles Willson Peale painted at Valley Forge in 1777. The original portrait is now in the State Normal School at West Chester, Pa. (456,198,500 issued)
4¢ - Scott #709 The likeness of Washington taken from a painting by Charles Willson Peale. The painting was donated to the National Portrait Gallery by its former owner, Mr. William Patten, Rhinebeck, N.Y. (151,201,300 issued)
5¢ - Scott #710 The likeness of Washington from a painting by Charles Willson Peale made in 1795, and now in the possession of the New York Historical Society. (170,565,100 issued)
6¢ - Scott #711 representing Washington in the uniform of a general reproduced from a painting by John Trumbull in 1792, now in Yale University. (111,739,400 issued)
7¢ - Scott #712 The portrait painted by John Trumbull in 1780, the original of which is now in the Metropolitan Museum of Art. (83,257,400 issued)
8¢ - Scott #713 The profile bust portrait of Washington facing to the left, reproduced from a crayon drawing made from life by Charles Balthazar Julien Févret de Saint-Mémin at Philadelphia in 1798. (96,506,100 issued)
9¢ - Scott #714 The likeness of Washington modeled from a pastel portrait in the possession of the Masonic lodge of Alexandria, Va., for whom it was drawn from life by W. Williams in 1794. (75,709,200 issued)
10¢ - Scott #715 The portrait of Washington taken from a painting by Gilbert Stuart in 1795, now in the possession of the Metropolitan Museum of Art in New York City. (147,216,000 issued)

The bicentennial stamps were first placed on sale January 1, 1932, at the post office in Washington, D.C.

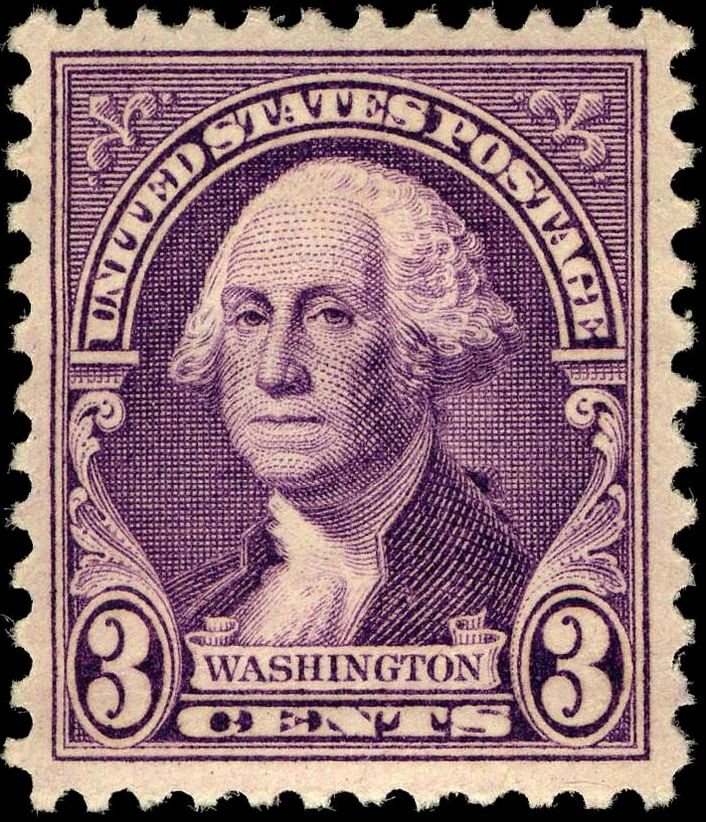

While the bicentennial issue presents many unfamiliar images of Washington, the Post Office took care to place the widely loved Gilbert Stuart portrait of the president on the 2-cent stamp, which satisfied the normal first-class letter rate and would therefore get the most use. Several months after the series appeared, however, the first-class letter rate was raised from 2 cents to 3 cents. The greatly increased demand for 3-cent stamps remained unsatisfied by emergency reprintings of the 3-cent Washington Bicentennial issue and the 3-cent Lincoln regular issue then currently available. Moreover, the new rate meant that the only Washington stamp available to the public for everyday use was one that offered a little-known and quite uncharacteristic image of Washington. Accordingly, the Post Office felt obliged to rush a new regular issue 3-cent stamp into production that offered a more familiar Washington portrait. Rather than taking the time to create a completely new design, the BEP revamped the bicentennial 2-cent Atheneum value as a 3-cent stamp (Scott #720), transforming it into a regular issue by eliminating the date ribbons flanking the portrait. This was printed in the standard 3-cent color, and also issued as vertical and horizontal coil stamps.

== See also ==
- Postage stamps and postal history of the United States
- Presidents of the United States on U.S. postage stamps
