= IFLScience =

Science news and media website

- Website type: Science news and education
- Available in: English
- Owner: LabX Media Group
- Founder: Elise Andrew
- Editor: Johannes Van Zijl
- Website: iflscience.com
- Launched: March 2012
- Current status: Active

IFLScience (formerly I Fucking Love Science) is a popular-science media website and brand that publishes news and educational content on topics including physics, biology, astronomy, health, and the environment. Originally a Facebook page started by Elise Andrew in 2012, it subsequently developed into a professional news website with full time salaried staff.

== History ==
IFLScience began as a Facebook page called "I Fucking Love Science", created by Elise Andrew in March 2012. Though she had not intended it to grow beyond "posting to a few dozen of [her] friends", the page rapidly gained attention for its informal tone and shareable science facts. After the first day, the page had over 1,000 likes and passed one million likes in September 2012. Andrew stated that this work ultimately led LabX Media Group, a Canadian science-media publisher, to hire her as a social media content manager that same year. The next year, the website iflscience.com was launched to expand beyond social-media posts into longer-form articles and digital editorial content. By January 2015, the page's Facebook had risen to 19.5 million likes.

In May 2020, Andrew renamed the company from "I Fucking Love Science" to "IFLScience", citing the swear word's incompatibility with Facebook's monetization systems, and saying that "much as I love the name, I love my staff more". LabX Media Group acquired then IFLScience in September that year.

== Audience and reach ==
According to its own "About" page, IFLScience "reaches over 10 million monthly global visitors through our website and 60 million globally through our social-media channels". Independent web analytics firm SEMrush reports that in September 2025 the site received about 7.12 million visits globally, about 78% of which were from the United States.

== Content ==
According to New York Magazine in 2016, the IFLScience Facebook page "often posts the type of viral science 'wins' that people love — cool pictures of space, crazy experiments, dinosaur discoveries".

== Reception ==
The European Union of Science Journalists' Associations stated in 2017 that IFLScience regularly achieved virality for their stories, which they said was known for "provoking headlines, short copy and rewriting of stories from other science media".

Under the ownership of Elise Andrew, IFLScience was criticised for its use of clickbait headlines, of images without credit or without permission of their creators, and of out-of-context images that failed to support claims that IFLScience made in their captions. In 2014, an article by MIT's Knight Science Journalism, a program which seeks to "advance science journalism in the public interest," found that content appearing on IFLS was "error-prone" and that false and misleading statements remained even after editorial staff were alerted of the issues. The article ultimately asserted that when mistakes are pointed out "they are rarely corrected". New York magazine wrote in 2016 that "people who get most of their news filtered through IFLScience are often doing themselves a disservice, and when they share those posts, they're usually doing others a disservice as well", and the IFLScience Facebook page was "consistently criticized for willful misrepresentation of the science that it claims to 'fucking love'".

In 2016, Time magazine quoted Andrew's response to criticism: "I'm not trying to teach people about science" and "I'm trying to give people that moment where they say, O.K., this is interesting, and I want to learn more".

== Awards ==
In 2014, IFLScience was nominated for and became a finalist in the 6th Annual Shorty Awards in the category of Science and in 2016, won the Science category at the 8th Shorty Awards. In 2023, Katy Evans, the managing editor of IFLScience, won the "editor of the year" award from the Association of British Science Writers.
