= The Scientist (magazine) =

Professional life science magazine

- Categories: Trade Magazine
- Frequency: Monthly
- Founder: Eugene Garfield
- Founded: 1986
- Company: LabX Media Group
- Website: the-scientist.com
- ISSN: 0890-3670
- OCLC: 698066177

The Scientist is a professional magazine intended for life scientists. The Scientist covers recently published research papers, current research, techniques, and other columns and reports of interest to its readers. The magazine is published monthly and is available in print and digital formats.

== Overview ==
The main purpose of the magazine is to provide print and online coverage of the latest developments in life sciences research, technology, careers, and business. Subject matters covered by the magazine include groundbreaking research, industry innovations, careers, financial topics, the economics of science, scientific ethics, profiles of scientists, lab tools, scientific publishing, techniques, product spotlight, and guides.

== History ==
The Scientist was founded in 1986 by American businessman Eugene Garfield as part of his academic publishing service Institute for Scientific Information. The publishing house was sold two years later to JPT Publishing, but Eugene Garfield eventually bought back The Scientist a few month later.

In 2009, the magazine had a round of layoffs, and its owner, the London-based Science Navigation Group, merged The Scientist with the website Faculty of 1000 for peer review and evaluation of articles in biology and medical journals. The Scientist moved from Philadelphia to New York in 2010.

In October 2011, the Science Navigation Group announced it was closing the magazine, but the LabX Media Group subsequently announced it would purchase and continue publishing it. The Group officially acquired the magazine at the end of October 2011.

== Top 10 Innovations Survey ==
Since 2008, The Scientist has conferred awards for the top innovations in science and technology: Nominations are submitted; entries are reviewed by a panel of judges; and the winners are announced annually in the December edition of the magazine.

== The Scientist online ==
=== Website ===
The Scientist offers a website that complements the print version by offering live science news and multimedia features, attracting roughly 1.2 million unique page views each month, according to Google Analytics.

=== Social media ===
In 2011, The Scientist launched a Facebook page, to deliver its content in the social media realm. The page now has more than 2 million page likes.

Since then, The Scientist has launched special interest Facebook pages to share the latest research developments in different life science topics. In December 2018, it was announced that some pages would be renamed and refocused for a more cohesive community.

== Awards ==
The Scientist has won many awards, including:

- 2018 ASBPE Awards of Excellence, Top Ten Award, Magazine of the Year
- 2016 ASBPE Awards of Excellence, Bronze - Web News Section & another in Infographics
- 2011 Gold and Silver 'Eddie' Award for Best Business-to-Business Science Magazine, Full Issue
- 2011 Bronze 'Eddie' Award for Best Business-to-Business Single Science Article
- 2011 Silver 'Eddie' Award for Best Business-to-Business News Coverage
- 2011 ASBPE Awards of Excellence, Magazine of the Year
- Gold 'Eddie' Award for Best Business-to-Business Science Website in the years 2009, 2010
- ASBPE Awards of Excellence Magazine of the year, circulation of less than 80,000 in the years 2008, and 2009
- Gold 'Eddie' Award for Best Business-to-Business Single Science Article in the years 2008, 2009, 2010, 2011
- 2007 Nomination as one of the Top 10 Business-to-Business Magazines
- 2007 Gold for Best Publication Redesign
- 2007 Silver for Best Individual/Company Profile for Ishani Ganguli's "A Complementary Pathway"
- Gold 'Eddie' Award for Best Business-to-Business Science Magazine in the years 2006, 2007, 2008, 2009, 2010
