= Laura Helmuth =

American science journalist

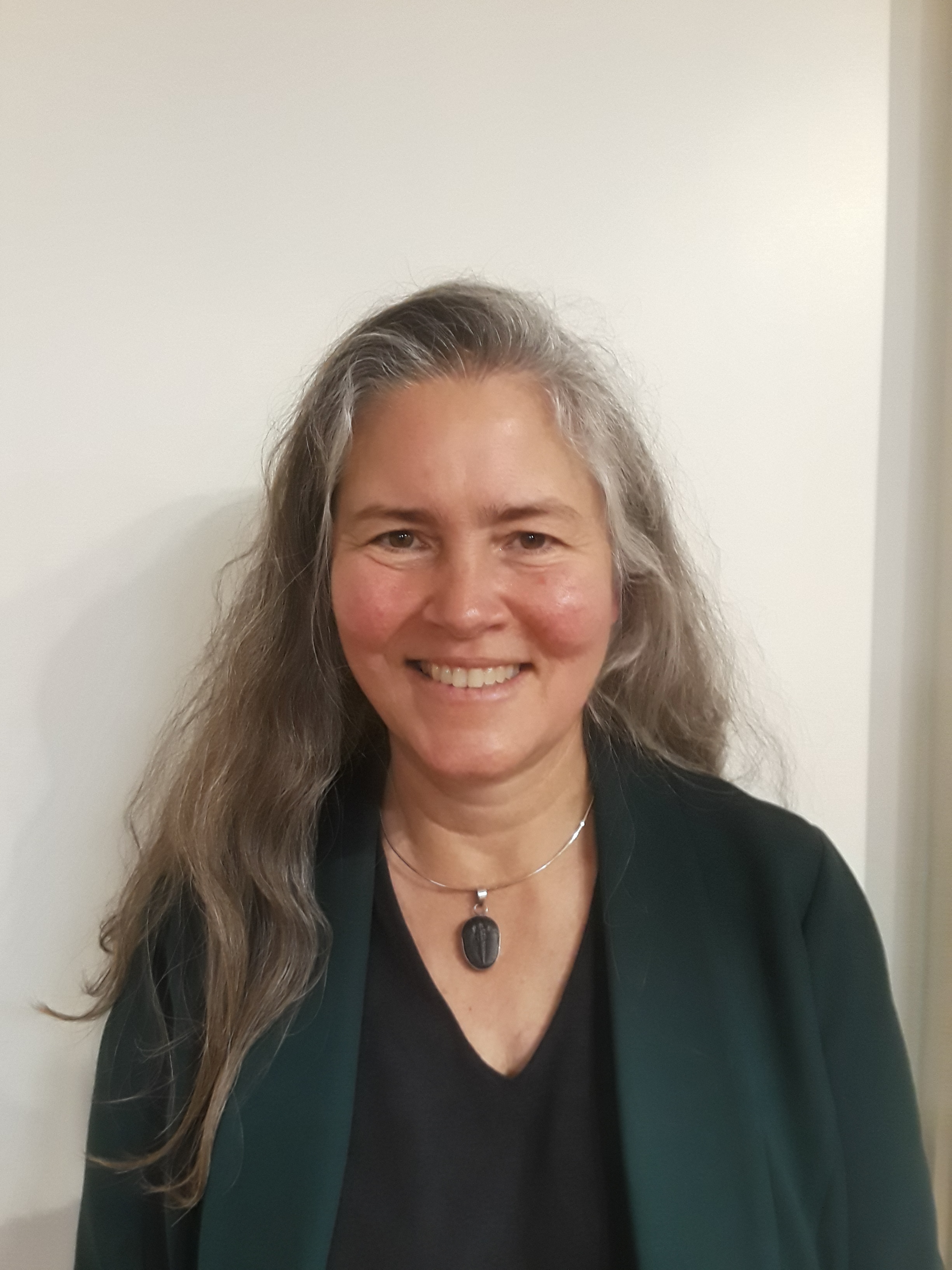
- Helmuth in December 2022
- Education: Eckerd College (BS); University of California, Berkeley (PhD); University of California, Santa Cruz
- Board member of: Society for Science and the Public, High Country News, Geological Society of Washington

Laura Lee Helmuth is an American science journalist and columnist for Slate and the Last Word on Nothing website. She was formerly editor in chief of Scientific American and the Health and Science editor at The Washington Post. From 2016 to 2018, she served as the president of the National Association of Science Writers.

== Education and early career ==
Helmuth grew up in Indiana. She attended Eckerd College in St. Petersburg, Florida, where she earned a Bachelor of Science degree in biology and psychology in 1991. She then attended the University of California, Berkeley, where she earned a Ph.D. degree in cognitive neuroscience in 1997. She performed her doctoral work in the laboratory of Richard Ivry. Her research centered on the underlying neuroscience of Parkinson's disease and contributed to the thesis Sequence Learning in Patients with Parkinson's Disease. Her research included the role of the cerebellum in verbal function, learning, attention, and studying how the brain coordinates and executes cyclic movements.

In 1998, she earned a certificate in science communication from University of California, Santa Cruz. She began her science-writing career as an intern at Science News.

== Writer and editor ==
Helmuth began her writing career as a staff reporter and editor for Science magazine, from 1999 to 2004. She then became a Science Editor at Smithsonian Magazine, where she remained from 2004 to 2012 before becoming the Science and Health editor at the online magazine Slate. On April 28, 2016, Helmuth was appointed The Washington Post's editor of Health, Science and Environment, where she initiated a Post series called "Medical Mysteries."

On April 13, 2020, Helmuth became the ninth overall editor-in-chief of Scientific American, succeeding Mariette DiChristina.

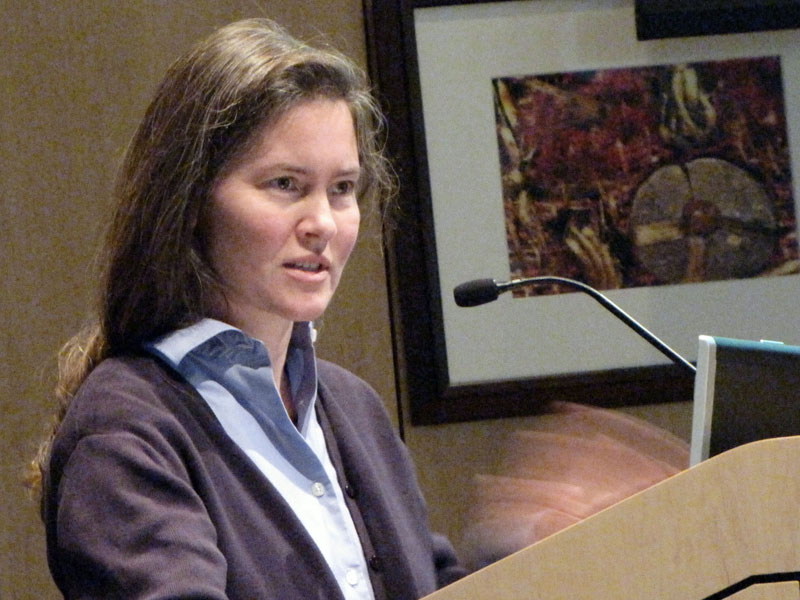
Helmuth speaks at the National Museum of Natural History in 2010

Helmuth has written about and lectured on combatting "misinformation through science journalism." She has stated that, in science journalism, it has started to be recognized that "there are not always two sides to every story." She offered the example of evolution, in relation to which she said, "we don’t quote creationists,” while she added that “with climate change, you can disagree about what to do about [it], but the science of it is completely, comprehensively proven.” While at the Washington Post, she oversaw the development of a video series called The Vaccine Project, written by Anna Rothschild and Brian Monroe, to address vaccine hesitancy.

In 2020, after the coronovirus pandemic erupted, Helmuth developed a tip sheet to help journalists cover it. She explained that "repetition makes misinformation feel more true."

=== Presidential endorsements ===
For the 2020 United States presidential election, Scientific American announced its endorsement of Joe Biden, the first endorsement of a presidential candidate in the magazine's 175-year history. The endorsement argued that Donald Trump "has badly damaged the U.S. and its people—because he rejects evidence and science", citing Trump's response to the COVID-19 pandemic. Helmuth said that the magazine's decision to endorse Biden was fast and unanimous, although not one made lightly, and that the endorsement was written to be "as inclusive as possible".

Scientific American endorsed Kamala Harris in the 2024 United States presidential election, writing that Donald Trump "endangers public health and safety and rejects evidence, preferring instead nonsensical conspiracy fantasies." Following Trump's victory, Helmuth criticized his supporters in a series of Bluesky posts, referring to many as "fascists" and the "meanest, dumbest, most bigoted" group. Helmuth's remarks provoked a backlash on Twitter, where some commenters questioned her commitment to scientific objectivity. Helmuth apologized for her "offensive and inappropriate" language and, several days later, announced her decision to resign from her position as editor in chief of Scientific American.

== Appointments and service ==
Helmuth serves as a member of the National Academies of Sciences, Engineering, and Medicine's Standing Committee on the project for Advancing Science Communication Research and Practice. She has also given lectures at institutions like the American Institute of Physics, the National Academy of Sciences, and the University of Wisconsin–Madison about how science journalists can counter misinformation and address uncertainty in their reporting.

From 2017 to 2018, Helmuth served as president of the National Association of Science Writers. She has also served as a board member for the Society for Science and the Public, and the American Association for the Advancement of Science's SciLine service which connects scientists and journalists.

== Bibliography ==
=== Articles ===
- "Hanukkah Food Smackdown! Latkes vs. Hamantashen". Smithsonian. December 22, 2008.
- "Why Bird Brains Bloom in Spring". Smithsonian. March 7, 2011.
- "Happy 30th, Sally Ride's First Space Flight. You Came Too Late". Slate. June 18, 2013.
- "Two Lives: Why Are You Not Dead Yet?". Slate. September 5, 2013.
- "James Watson Throws a Fit: The disgraced co-discoverer of DNA is selling his Nobel Prize". Slate. December 1, 2014.
- "Celebrating our demisemiseptcentennial". Scientific American. 323 (3): 6. September 2020. (Note: Online version is titled "Celebrating Scientific American’s 175th anniversary".)

== Awards and honors ==
- Distinguished Graduate Student Alumni Award, University of California, Santa Cruz, 2019
- Writer in Residence, University of Wisconsin–Madison, 2018
- In 2023 she received the Friend of Darwin award from the National Center for Science Education (NCSE) according to the executive director Ann Reid for having “tirelessly promoted the cause of evolution education”.
