= Richard Ivry =

American neuroscientist

- Education: Brown University; University of Oregon
- Awards: Sloan Research Fellowship; Troland Research Award; William James Fellow Award
- Scientific career
- Fields: Cognitive neuroscience
- Workplaces: UC Berkeley; Helen Wills Neuroscience Institute
- Notable students: Laura Helmuth

Richard B. Ivry is an American cognitive neuroscientist. He is a currently Distinguished Professor in the Department of Psychology at the University of California, Berkeley and a founding member of the Helen Wills Neuroscience Institute. Ivry previously served as chair of the university's Department of Psychology and director of its Institute of Cognitive and Brain Sciences. According to the Association for Psychological Science, Ivry's "seminal research program has transformed how we understand perception and action."

Ivry received a Bachelor of Arts in psychology from Brown University in 1981. He completed a Master of Science and Ph.D. in psychology at the University of Oregon in 1983 and 1986. In 1990, Ivry received a Sloan Research Fellowship in neuroscience. In 1997, he received a Troland Research Award.

In 2016, Ivry received the William James Fellow Award.
