= Munn Run =

Coordinates: 38°45′11″N 82°55′38″W

Munn Run is a stream located entirely within Scioto County, Ohio.

Munn Run was named for James Munn, a veteran of the American Revolutionary War.

== See also ==
- List of rivers of Ohio
