= Orson Desaix Munn =

Publisher of the Scientific American (1824–1907)

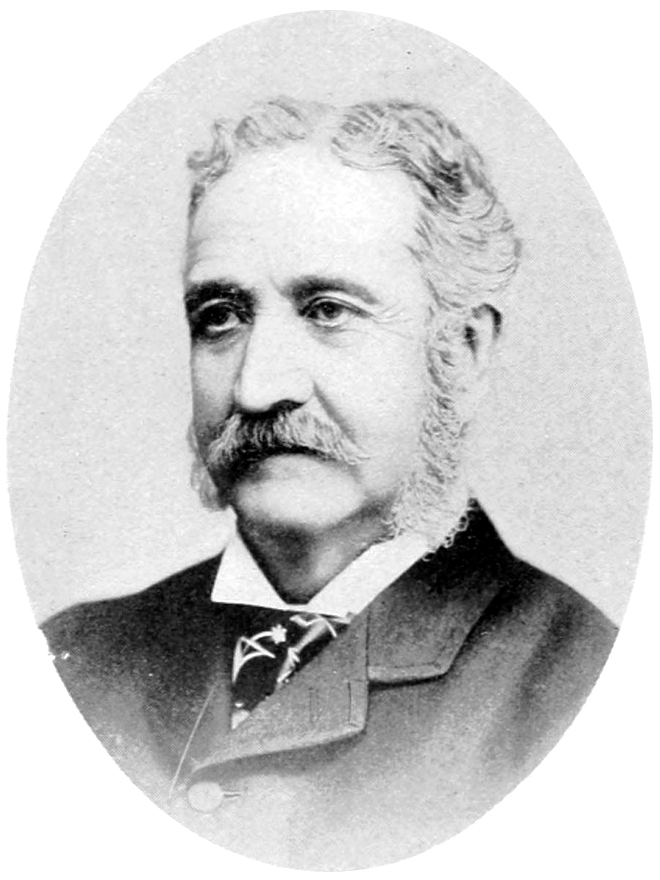
- Born: June 11, 1824; Monson, Massachusetts
- Died: February 28, 1907 (aged 82); The Bronx, New York
- Resting place: Woodlawn Cemetery
- Occupation: Publisher
- Known for: Munn & Company; Scientific American
- Children: Charles Allen Munn; Henry Norcross Munn
- Parent(s): Rice Munn, Lavinia Shaw
- Relatives: Orson Desaix Munn II (grandson)

Orson Desaix Munn (June 11, 1824 – February 28, 1907) was the publisher of Scientific American.

== Biography ==
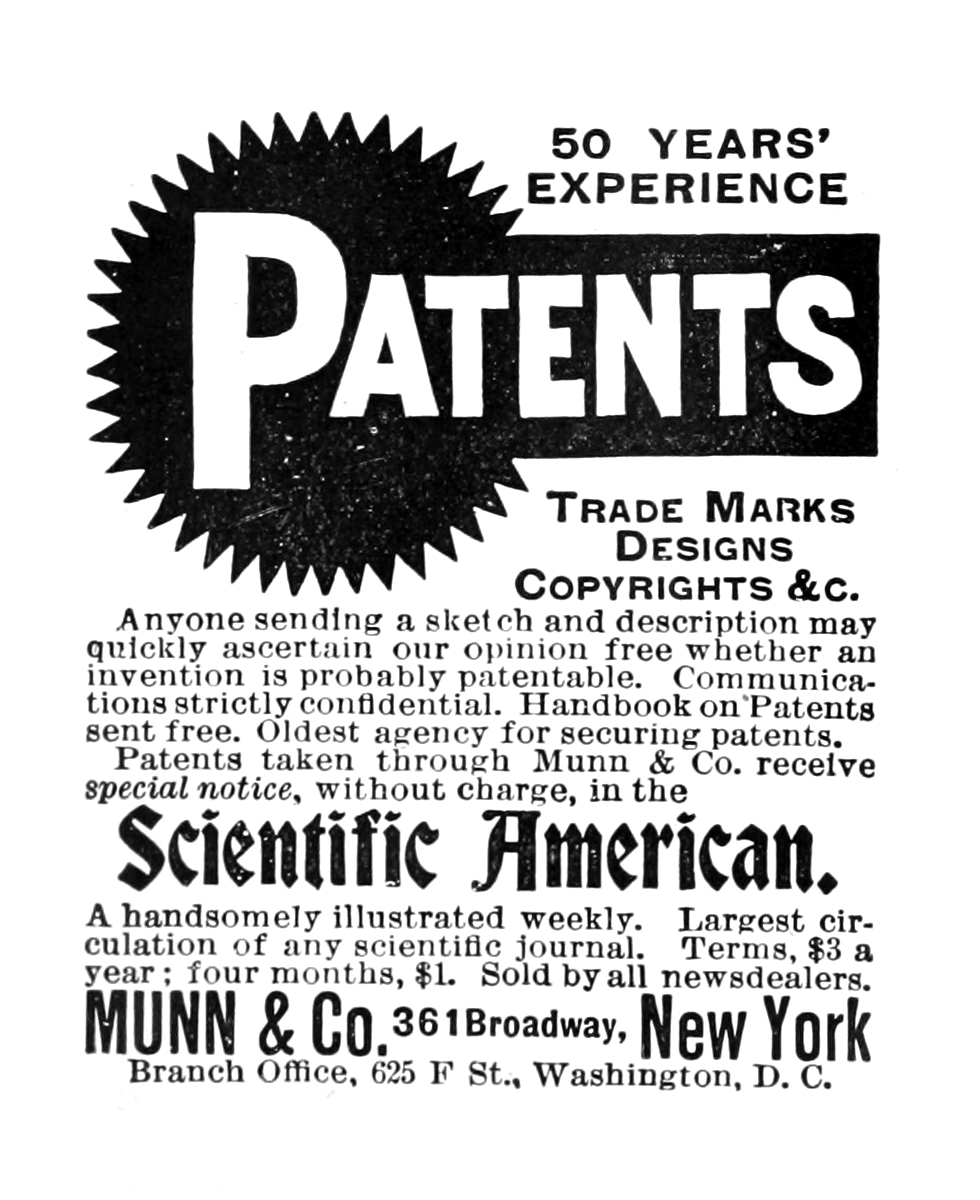
1903 advertisement for Munn & Company, patent solicitors and publisher of Scientific American magazine

Orson Desaix Munn was born on June 11, 1824, in Monson, Massachusetts. He received his education at the academy in his native town, and, deciding on a business career, went to work for a bookstore in Springfield. After two years of this experience, he returned to accept a more important commercial trust in Monson, but soon found his way to New York City.

He took over the publishing operations of Munn & Company, a New York patent firm, with Salem Howe Wales and Alfred Ely Beach as editor.

With Beach, he bought the six-month-old Scientific American magazine from Rufus Porter. The purchase price of this property was less than $1,000, and it included a subscription list of 200 names. Porter continued as editor, and the enterprise, placed on a sound business basis, at once proved a success. It was the first popular scientific journal in the United States, and it is now the oldest, having a recognized standing throughout the civilized world. Its function has been the publication of the record of the progress of art and science both at home and abroad.

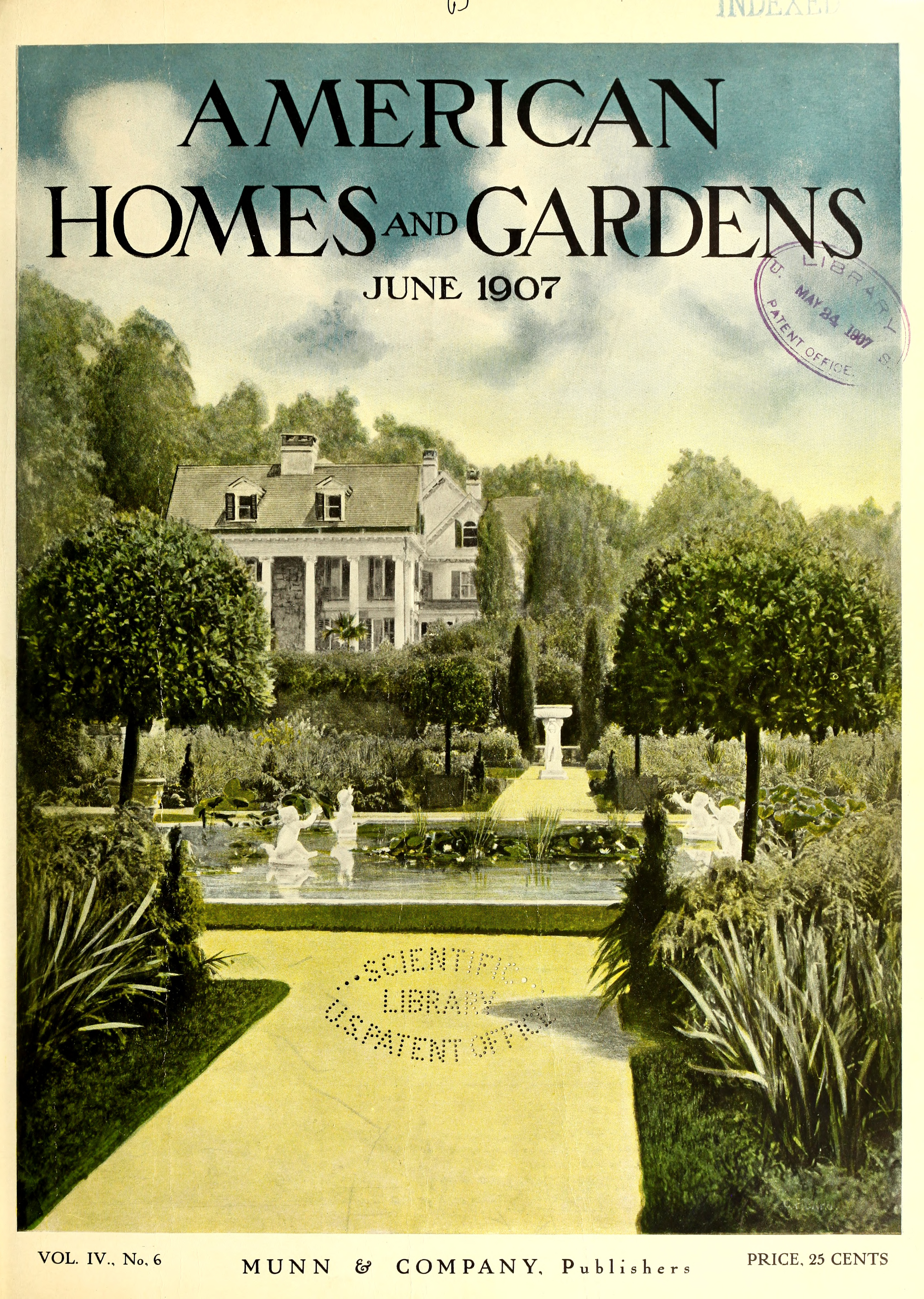
"Hurstmont" in Morristown, New Jersey, on the cover of American Homes and Gardens (June 1907)

In 1876 the demand upon its space was so great, owing to the increased interest that resulted from the Centennial Exposition, that a Scientific American Supplement was started. An architect and builders edition, published monthly, was established in 1885; Scientific American Building Monthly was renamed American Homes and Gardens magazine in July 1905.

Among the earliest requests made to the publishers of the Scientific American was for advice concerning the procuring of letters-patent for new inventions, there being at that time no professional patent solicitors. This department of the business developed with great rapidity, and a branch office for it was soon opened in Washington, D.C. For many years Munn & Co. enjoyed a virtual monopoly of this class of business, and upward of 100,000 applications for patents were made by this house. Munn strictly adhered to a principle never to invest a penny in any patented invention.

In August 1849, Munn married Julia Augusta Allen. They had two sons, Henry Norcross Munn and Charles Allen Munn.

Munn died on 28 February 1907, and was buried at Woodlawn Cemetery.
