= Science Online =

Science Online was an annual conference held in Durham, North Carolina, Raleigh, North Carolina and Research Triangle Park, North Carolina, that focused on the role of the internet in science and science communication. It was attended primarily by bloggers and science journalists from North America.

The conference was held annually, beginning in 2007. Notable attendees included PZ Myers, Jennifer Ouellette, Rebecca Skloot, Carl Zimmer and others. The conferences were covered as local news by publications such as The Charlotte Observer, as well as "new media" like Boing Boing, professional journalist organizations like the Columbia Journalism Review and science-oriented publications like Scientific American.

In October 2014, the ScienceOnline foundation, which organized the conferences, announced that it had become insolvent and consequently was shutting down.
