= Carrie Munn =

American fashion designer

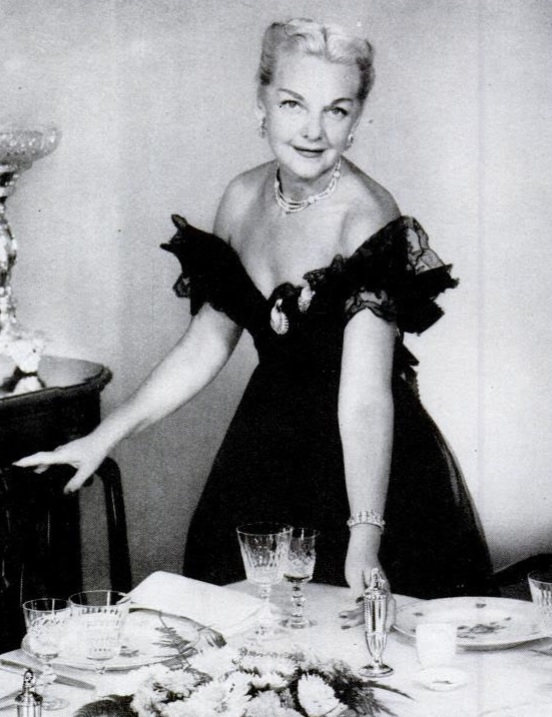
- Carrie Munn, in a 1951 advertisement
- Born: Caroline Neunder; January 29, 1898; Buffalo, New York
- Died: February 1, 1984 (aged 86); New York, New York
- Other name: Carolyn Nunder (stage name)
- Spouse: Orson Desaix Munn II

Carrie Munn (January 29, 1898 – February 1, 1984), born Caroline M. Neunder, was an American fashion designer.

== Early life ==
Caroline M. Neunder was born in Buffalo, New York, the daughter of George F. Neunder and Carolina U. Kreuzer Neunder. Her mother died in 1907. George Griswold Frelinghuysen was her cousin.

== Career ==
As Caroline Nunder or Carolyn Nunder, she had a brief stage career, appearing as a showgirl in two Broadway productions, Girl o' Mine (1918) and Aphrodite (1919). She also designed costumes for Sonny (1921). She also published a short book, Everyday Problems in Etiquette: Explained in Pictures (1922). She opened a dress shop in New York City in 1920, to help support her sister after their father's death.

Munn, a self-taught seamstress with no formal design training, opened another shop on Madison Avenue in 1941; she offered American-made couture gowns, dresses, suits, and separates during World War II and afterwards. She gave parties to show her latest designs to socialites and celebrities, including Elizabeth Parke Firestone and Dorothy Kilgallen, and often modeled her own creations at society events. Her typical silhouettes featured full skirts and nipped-in waists. "Every bodice is moulded close to the figure with a tiny waist. Do not expect limp sheaths or shirtwaist types from this designer," said a newspaper report of Munn's Fall 1952 collection. In 1957, her name was discussed for a possible appointment to an ambassadorship in Luxembourg or Belgium.

== Personal life and legacy ==
Munn married lawyer and magazine editor Orson Desaix Munn II in 1924; they had a son, Orson Desaix Munn III, born in 1925. Her husband died in 1958, and she died in 1984, in New York City, a few days after her 86th birthday. Museums holding works by Carrie Munn include The Henry Ford and the Museum of Fine Arts, Houston.
