= Orson Desaix Munn II =

American editor and publisher (1883–1958)

Orson Desaix Munn II (1883–1958) was an editor and publisher of Scientific American magazine.

He was the son of Henry Norcross Munn (1851-1905) and his wife Annie E. Elder (1855-1917), the nephew of Charles Allen Munn, and the grandson of the original publisher of Scientific American, Orson Desaix Munn.

Munn married twice. His first wife was actress Margaret Lawrence. They married in 1911 and had two daughters before divorcing in 1922. Munn's second wife was Caroline "Carrie" Nunder (1898-1984). They married in 1924 and had one son, Orson Desaix Munn III (1925-2011). Carrie Munn became a well known dress designer in the 1940s and 1950s.

Munn sold his interest in Scientific American magazine in 1950, and became senior partner of the law firm of Munn, Liddy, Daniels & March.

He died on December 22, 1958, in Southampton, New York, Long Island.
