= Jason Munn =

American graphic artist

- Born: Jason Munn; Neenah, Wisconsin
- Known for: Graphic Art, Poster Art
- Notable work: Poster Art, 2002-Present
- Movement: Silkscreen Poster Art

Jason Munn is an American graphic and poster artist. He is best known for creating posters for many Indie-Rock bands. His posters can be found online and at many music festivals around the United States, in modern art museums, and as well as the covers of CD albums. In 2010, Chronicle Books published a book called "The Small Stakes" that focuses on Munn's poster work from 2002 to 2009.

== Beginnings as an artist ==
Munn was born in Neenah, Wisconsin. At a young age, he was constantly drawing. As a teenager Munn began skateboarding, and started noticing his love for art and design. He was influenced by skateboard graphics, and the covers of CD cases. Munn went to school at Madison Area Technical College for graphic design. In 2002, Munn moved to Oakland, California. He started as an amateur designer making collage-based flyers for the small Berkeley club The Ramp. Munn's artwork started getting recognized after the band Death Cab For Cutie, asked him to create posters and T-shirts for them. He went on to create striking pieces that have become a part of the permanent collections of the San Francisco Museum of Modern Art and the Denver Art Museum.

== Style ==
Munn's style is silk-screen poster art. He uses bold, geometric designs to create images that in a way represent the band, or the festival he is creating it for. His early work used a lot of found imagery or combined multiple pieces of abstract imagery to create something new. Munn rarely use abstract imagery now, but he does work with a lot of common objects, changing them in some way to get a different meaning from the objects and to relate them to the bands. His work usually consist of the same objects; records, cameo-style profiles/heads, nature images, television, telephones. Munn uses these same objects to create continuity in his artwork.

== Posters and clients ==
His posters have become regular fixtures at poster conventions like Flatstock. Some of his most loyal clients include: Alamo Drafthouse Cinema, Andrew Bird, The Books Chronicle Books, Criterion Collection, Death Cab For Cutie, Flight Of The Conchords, Insound Levi's, Mark Kozelek, Modest Mouse, The National New York Times Magazine, Noise Pop Festival Patagonia, San Francisco Museum of Modern Art, Sonic Youth, and Wired.

== Present day ==
Munn lives in Oakland, California. He designs under the pseudonym "The Small Stakes", which is also the name of his design studio. He continues to create poster work for bands and festivals. In the near future he will begin collaborating with the graphic artist Dirk Fowler.

== Awards and recognition ==
Munn's art work has appeared in exhibits and publications around the United States. A selection of his posters are part of the permanent collection at the San Francisco Museum of Modern Art and Denver Art Museum.

In 2010, Chronicle Books published "The Small Stakes" which focuses on Munn's posters created from 2002–2009.
