= Hashem Al-Ghaili =

Yemeni science communicator

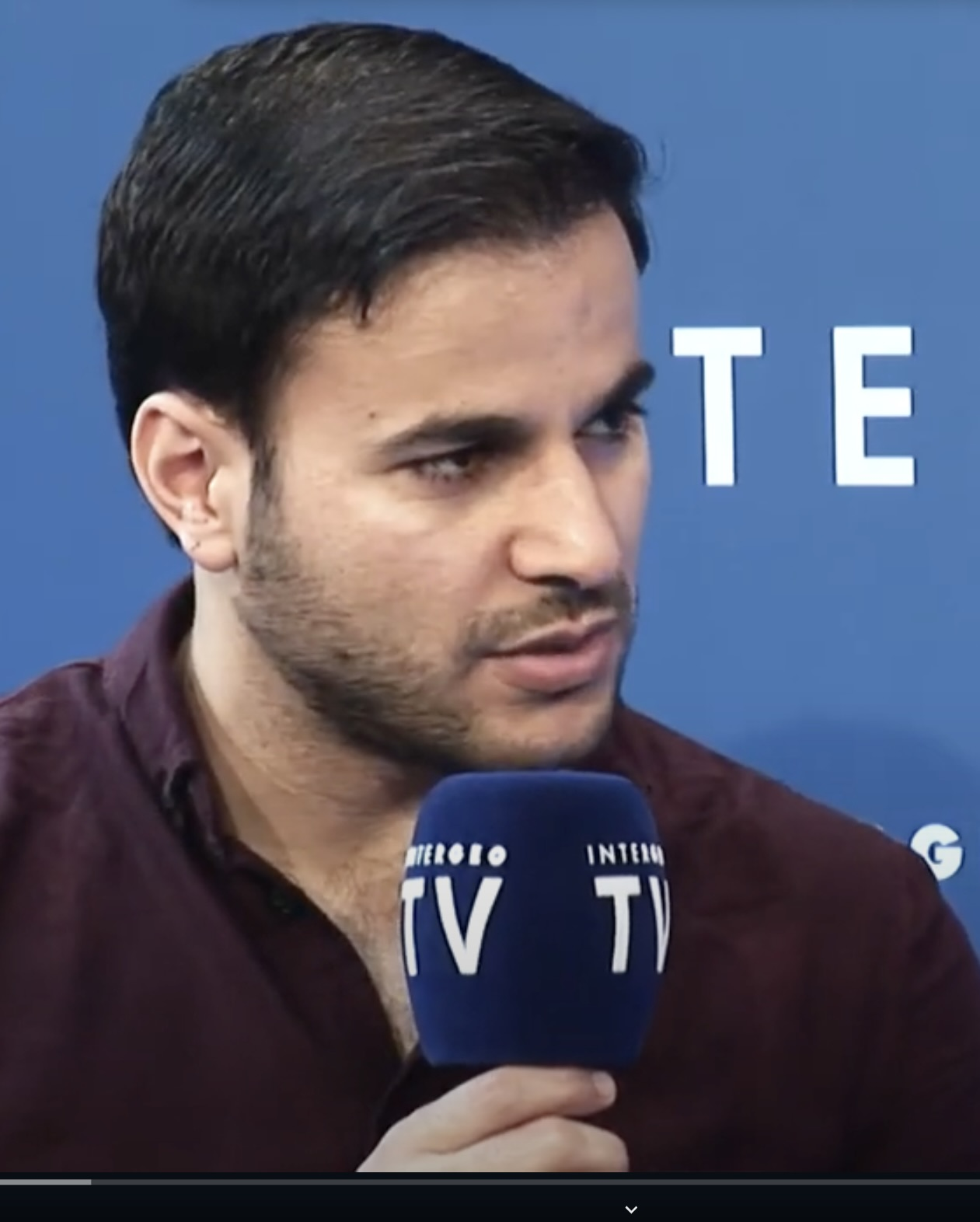
- Born: August 11, 1990 (age 36)
- Education: Jacobs University Bremen, Germany, University of Peshawar, Pakistan
- Occupations: Science communicator; Director; Producer
- Website: https://hashem-alghaili.com/

Hashem Al-Ghaili (born August 11, 1990) is a Yemeni molecular biologist, science communicator, and director. He is best known for his eponymous Facebook page, which he created in 2008. There, he publishes infographics and short-form videos about scientific news and research. As of October 2022, the page had secured more than 32 million followers.

This sizable following has attracted interest from sociologists, which ultimately led to Al-Ghaili's page being included in a 2018 Pew Research Center investigation into the impact of science content on social media.

Al-Ghaili made his directorial debut in 2019 with the award-winning short Simulation, which received recognition at several awards ceremonies and international film festivals. He self-published his first book, Simulation: The Great Escape, in 2023.

== Life and career ==
Al-Ghaili was born in Yemen in 1990. He was raised with 11 siblings in the northern part of the country, where his family owned a qat farm. After graduating from high school at 16, Al-Ghaili's father wanted him to work on the family farm. However, Al-Ghaili secretly applied for a government scholarship to study abroad. He earned his Bachelor's Degree at the University of Peshawar in Pakistan in 2008 and received his Master's Degree in Molecular Biology from Constructor University (formerly Jacobs University) in Germany in 2015.

In 2009, Al-Ghaili created his eponymous Facebook page and started posting images and videos about scientific news and research. In November 2018, he had more than 16 million followers. By 2022, his following had increased to more than 32 million.

Al-Ghaili's work in science communication has gained the attention of science news sources, academics, and political commentators. His page was a part of a 2018 investigation into the impact of science content on social media by the Pew Research Center. The investigation found that, across all pages analyzed, the highest amount of engagement was consistently seen on visual posts that had little additional information.

Al-Ghaili's concept designs have likewise gained the attention of news outlets and internet personalities. On several occasions, these hyper-realistic digital renderings were taken out of context by online users, who mistakenly believed that they were real. For example, in 2022, there was an outcry after Al-Ghaili posted a concept video for an artificial womb facility. Candace Owens, a conservative political commentator and television presenter, responded to the video, saying "A German scientist has unveiled an artificial birthing pod that could replace a mother's womb. It always starts with a good sell, but the slippery slope will end up with the government dictating who can and can't have children. The 'dystopian future' we often talk about could actually be a lot closer than we think."

In response to the outcry, a number of media publications enlisted fact-checkers to investigate the claims made by Owens and others. Al-Ghaili also responded in multiple interviews; "I understand that the video was taken out of context and some people shared it online as if it were real. The main goal of creating the video was to ignite the discussion about an emerging technology and to highlight scientific progress in the field of ectogenesis," he said.

In 2019, Al-Ghaili pivoted to more serious film work, writing, producing, and directing his first short film, Simulation. The film has a run time of 23 minutes and received awards and nominations from the Latitude Film Awards, Independent Shorts Awards, and the London Independent Film Awards among others. In 2022, he started work on his first full-length feature film, Orbital. He self-published his first book, Simulation: The Great Escape, in 2023.

== Awards ==
Al-Ghaili has received a grant and multiple awards for his dedication to research and his deep understanding of science communication.

- Futurism Excellence in Science Media and Literature Award (2014)
- Ambassador to the Republic of Yemen, Peshawar University (2012)

== Filmography ==
Al-Ghaili has directed, produced, and written two science-fiction films. His short film Simulation (2019) has won the Award of Excellence and Best Visual Effects from Los Angeles-based international awards competition Global Shorts.

- Simulation (2019, short film)
- Orbital (upcoming)
