= Scientific American =

American monthly science magazine

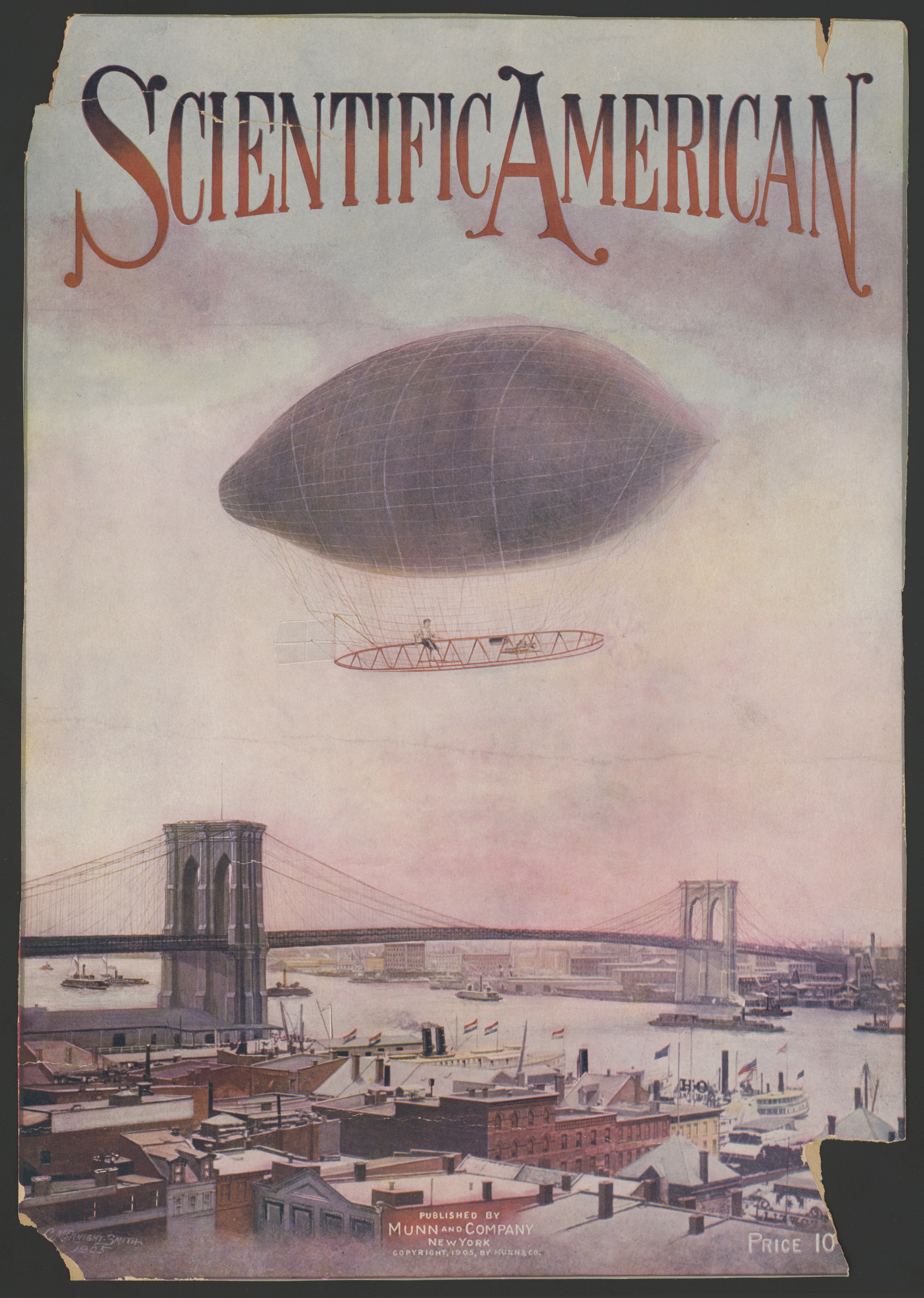
- Cover of a 1905 issue
- Categories: Popular science
- Frequency: Monthly
- Publisher: LabX Media Group
- Founded: 1845
- First issue: August 28, 1845; 181 years ago
- Country: United States
- Language: English
- Website: www.scientificamerican.com
- ISSN: 0036-8733
- OCLC: 796985030

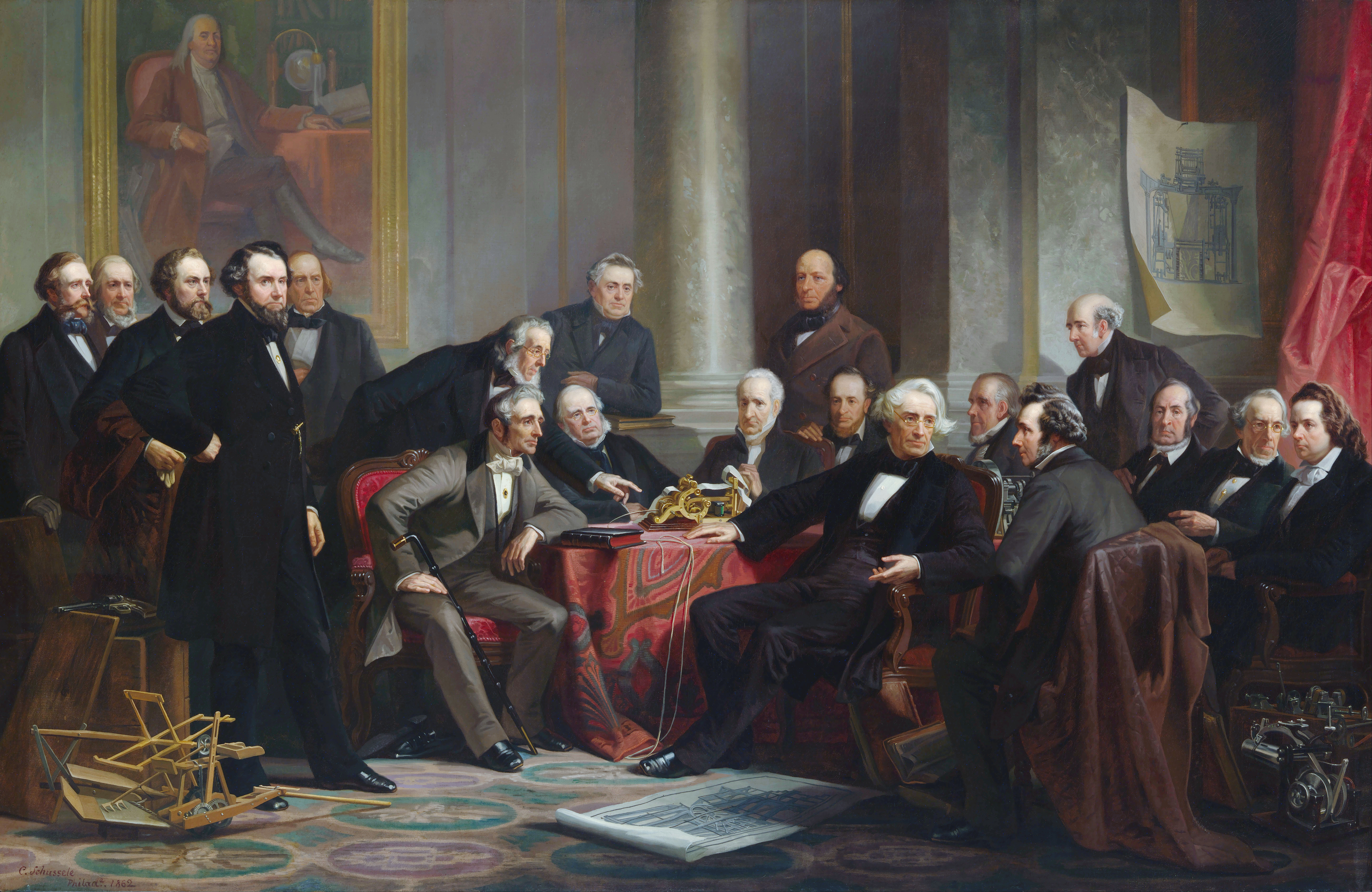
"Men of Progress", published by the magazine in 1862, showing American inventors such as Samuel Morse, Samuel Colt, Cyrus McCormick, Charles Goodyear, Peter Cooper, and others

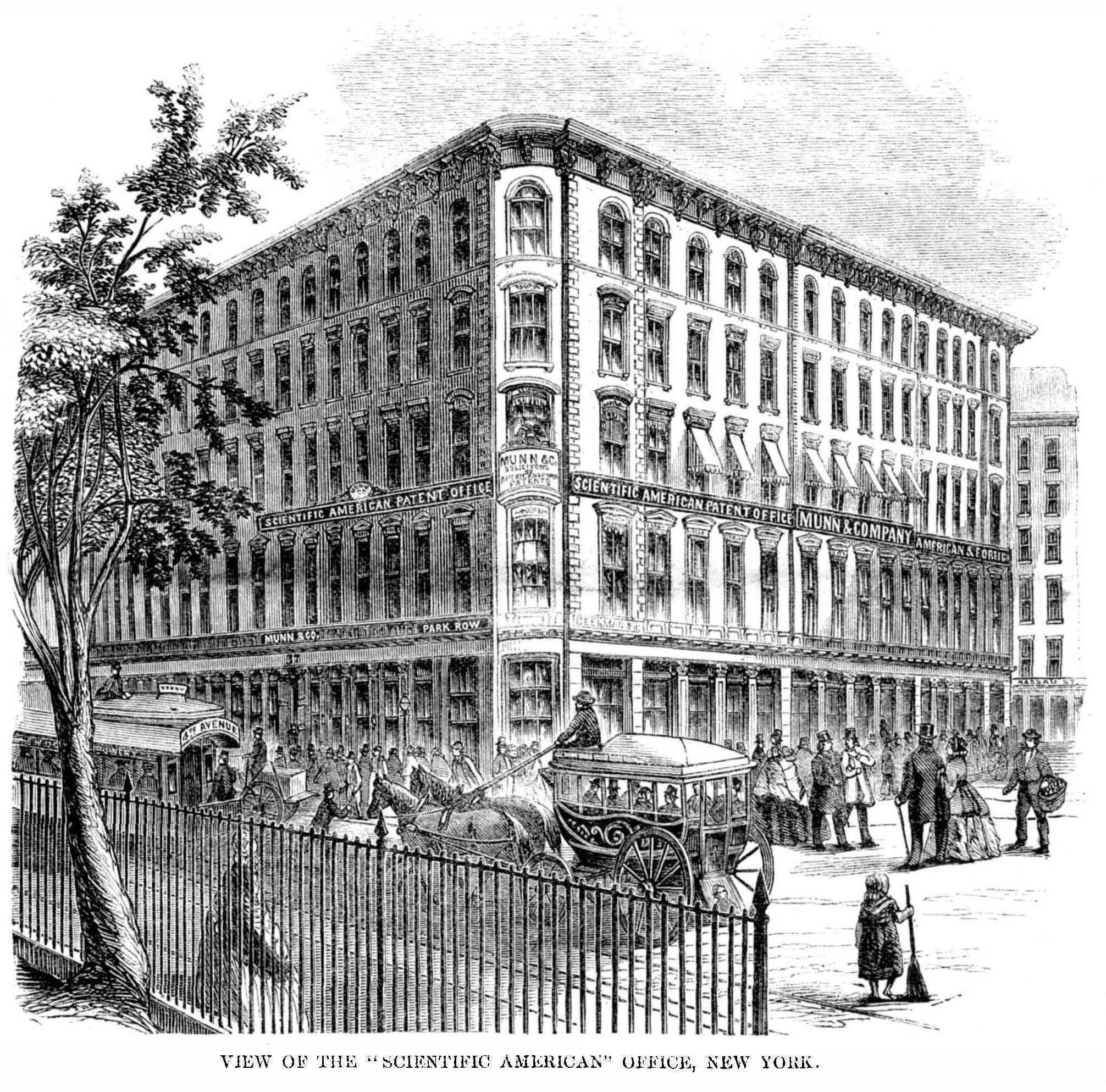
Scientific American Office, New York, 37 Park Row, 1859, next to Munn & Co. on the right

Scientific American, informally abbreviated SciAm or sometimes SA, is an American popular science magazine. Many scientists, including Albert Einstein and Nikola Tesla, once contributed articles to it, with more than 150 Nobel Prize-winners having been featured since its inception.

In print since 1845, it is the oldest continuously published magazine in the United States. Scientific American was owned by Springer Nature until June 2026. However, amidst financial struggles and its partial pivot to politics, it was sold to LabX Media Group in June 2026.

== History ==
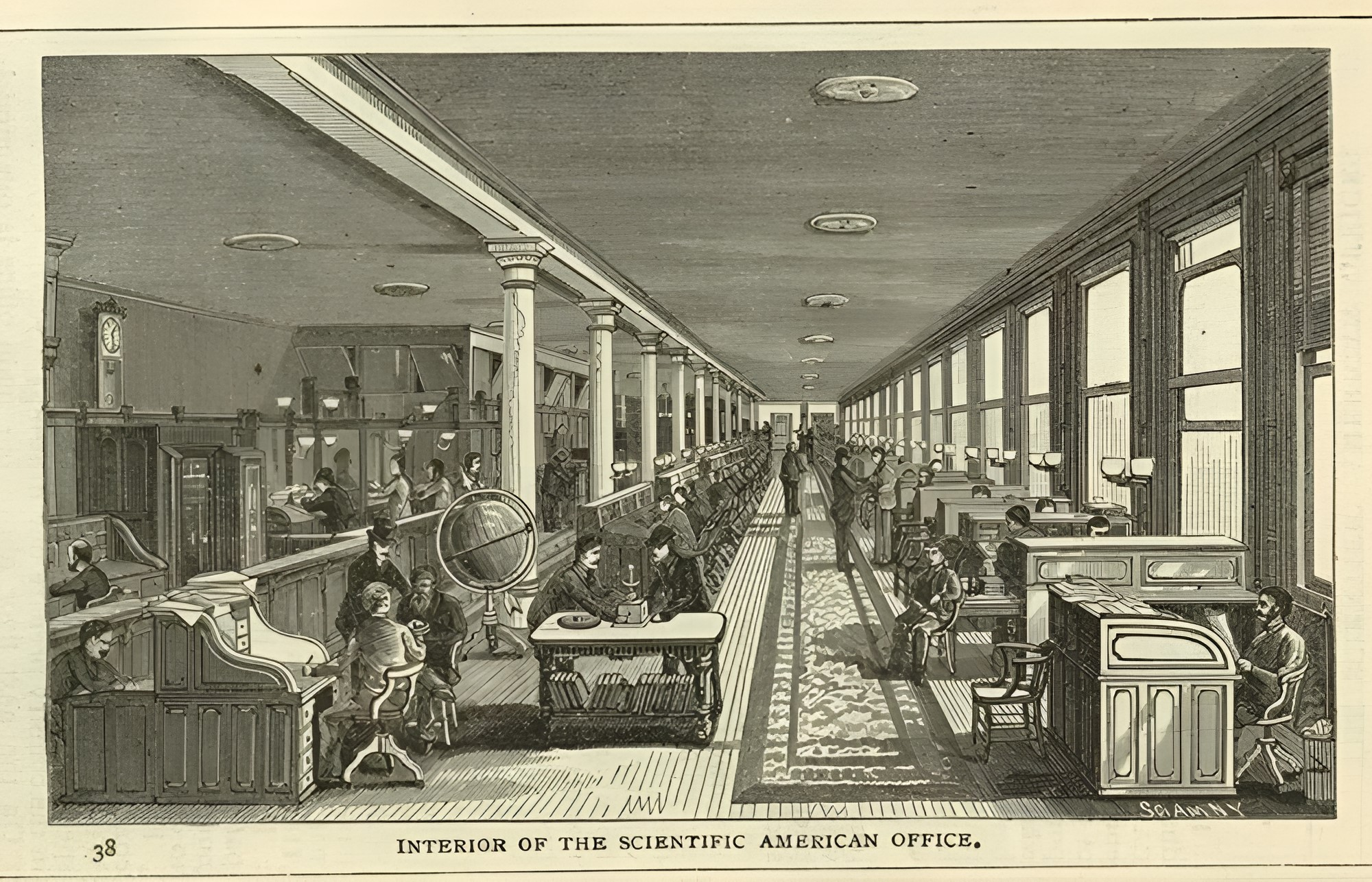
Interior of Scientific American's office at 361 Broadway in New York City

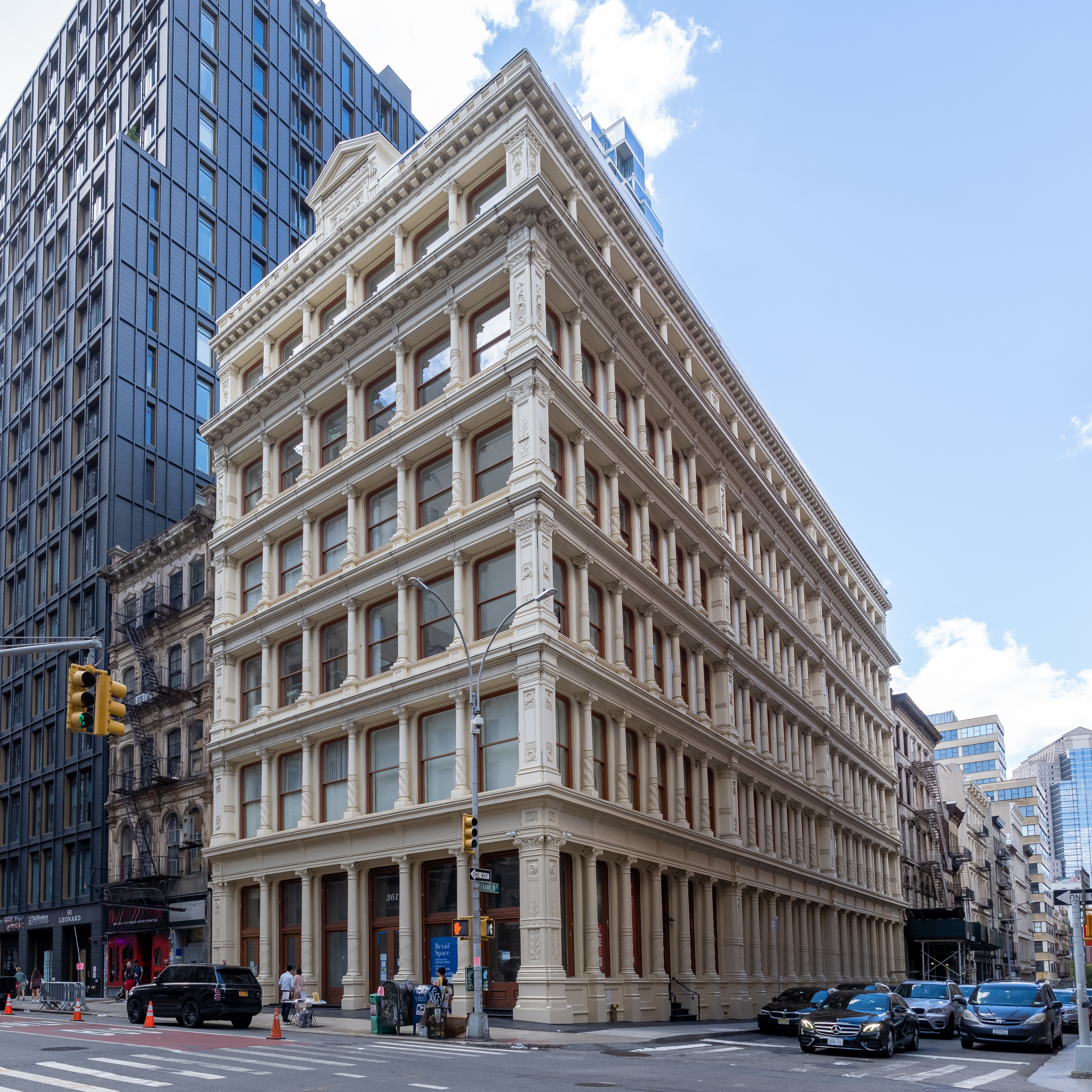
Scientific American's early office at 361 Broadway in Manhattan

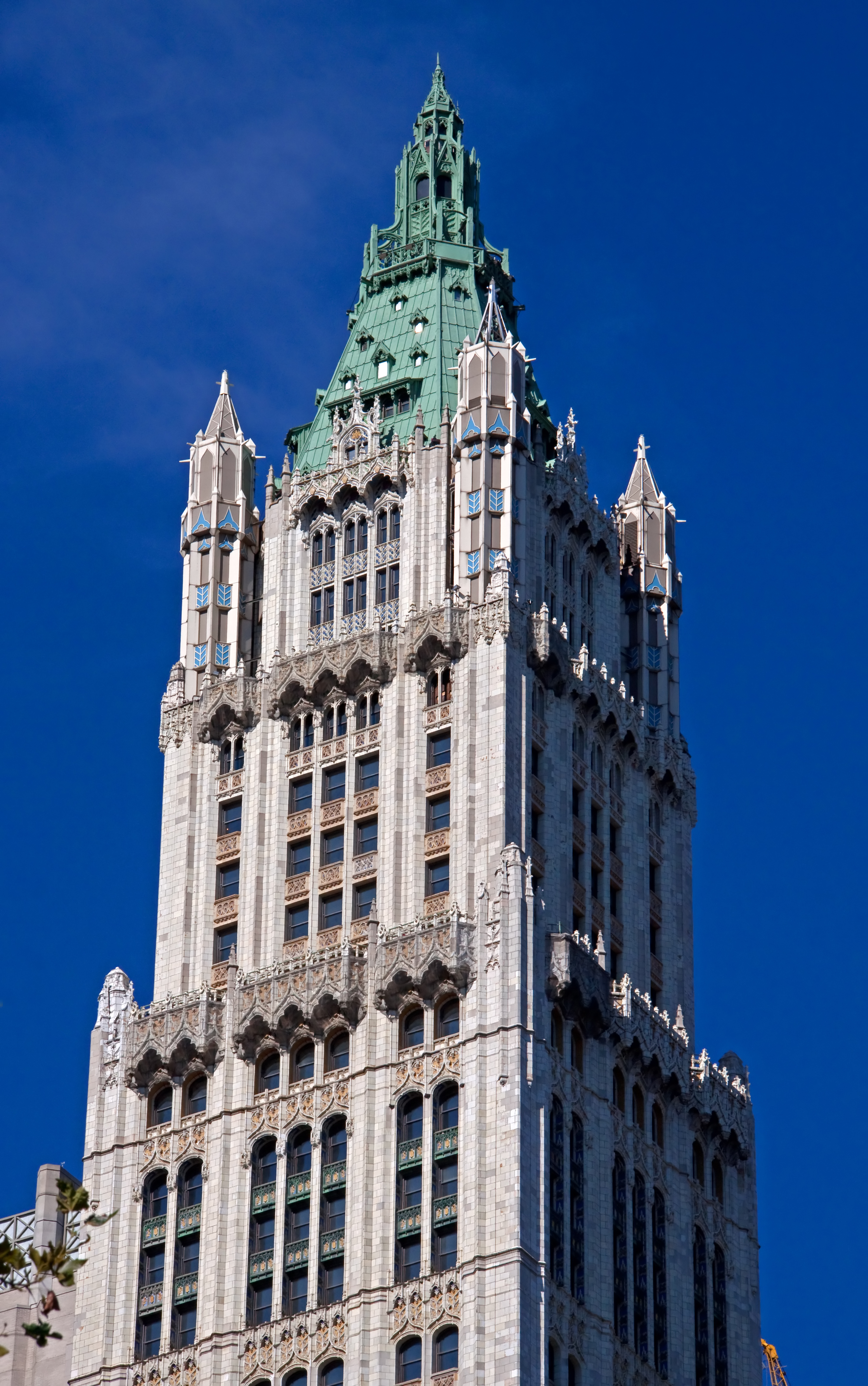
A 2011 photo of Scientific American's office at the Woolworth Building in New York City, built in 1913 by Frank Winfield Woolworth

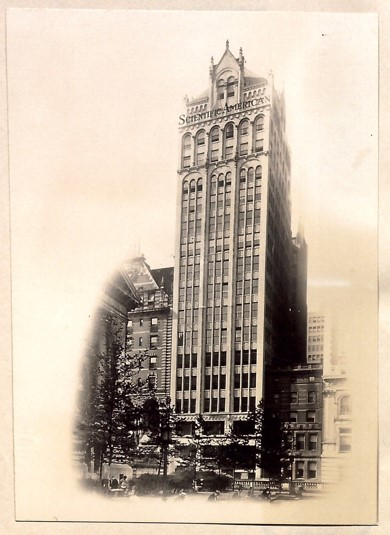
The Scientific American building at 24-26 West 40th Street, commissioned by Munn and Co. in 1924

Scientific American was founded by inventor and publisher Rufus Porter in 1845 as a four-page weekly newspaper. The first issue of the large-format New York City newspaper was released on August 28, 1845.

Throughout its early years, much emphasis was placed on reports of what was going on at the U.S. Patent Office. It also reported on a broad range of inventions including perpetual motion machines, an 1860 device for buoying vessels by Abraham Lincoln, and the universal joint, which now can be found in nearly every automobile manufactured. Current issues include a "this date in history" section, featuring excerpts from articles originally published 50, 100, and 150 years earlier. Topics include humorous incidents, wrong-headed theories, and noteworthy advances in the history of science and technology. It started as a weekly publication in August 1845 before turning into a monthly in November 1921.

Porter sold the publication to Alfred Ely Beach, son of media magnate Moses Yale Beach, and Orson Desaix Munn, a mere ten months after founding it. Editors and co-owners from the Yale family included Frederick C. Beach and his son, Stanley Yale Beach, and from the Munn family, Charles Allen Munn and his nephew, Orson Desaix Munn II. Until 1948, it remained owned by the families under Munn & Company. Under Orson Munn's grandson, Orson Desaix Munn III, it had evolved into something of a "workbench" publication, similar to the 20th-century incarnation of Popular Science.

In the years after World War II, the magazine fell into decline. In 1948, three partners who were planning on starting a new popular science magazine, to be called The Sciences, purchased the assets of the old Scientific American instead and put its name on the designs they had created for their new magazine. Thus the partners—publisher Gerard Piel, editor Dennis Flanagan, and general manager Donald H. Miller Jr. essentially created a new magazine. Miller retired in 1979, Flanagan and Piel in 1984, when Gerard Piel's son Jonathan became president and editor; circulation had grown fifteen-fold since 1948.

In 1986, it was sold to the Holtzbrinck Publishing Group of Germany, which has owned it until the Springer-Nature merger. In the fall of 2008, Scientific American was put under the control of Holtzbrinck's Nature Publishing Group division.

Donald Miller died in December 1998, Gerard Piel in September 2004 and Dennis Flanagan in January 2005. Mariette DiChristina became editor-in-chief after John Rennie stepped down in June 2009, and stepped down herself in September 2019.

In 2009, the publisher notified collegiate libraries that yearly subscription prices for the magazine would increase by nearly 500% for print and 50% for online access to $1,500 yearly.

Offices of the Scientific American have included 37 Park Row in Manhattan and the Woolworth Building in 1915 when it was just finished two years earlier in 1913. The Woolworth Building was at the time one of the first skyscrapers in the city and the tallest one in the world.

In 2020, Laura Helmuth was hired as editor in chief. As the George Floyd protests were raging and Covid-19 had prompted a general shutdown in the United States, she shifted the focus of the magazine to be more about politics, specifically from a left-wing perspective, including a first-of-its-kind endorsement of Joe Biden for president. As Biden's term progressed, the magazine continued to publish a plethora of opinion articles that often touched more on politics than on science. In November 2024, the day after Donald Trump won the presidency for a second time, Helmuth posted a diatribe online where she called Trump supporters "fascists" and "bigots", and promptly resigned under pressure from Springer Nature, Scientific American's owner. By March 2025, four months after Trump took office for the second time, Scientific American published a piece called "Science Tells Us the U.S. Is Heading toward a Dictatorship", leading to management significantly limiting the opinion section of the magazine. In the words of multimedia editor Kelso Harper, "it felt like a pendulum swing back to ‘let’s stick to the science'". Subscriptions had plummeted amid the surge of political content in Scientific American; as magazine president Kim Lau admitted at the time, "We are losing a lot of money, and we do not necessarily have a clear path to closing that gap."

By March 2026, new editor-in-chief David Ewalt was telling staff "let’s be realistic about the world we live in" with regard to political slants in articles. Alarmed, the dwindling staff voted to start the process of unionization. In June 2026, just three days before the final vote, Springer Nature sold Scientific American and Spektrum der Wissenschaft, ostensibly to focus on its core research, health, and education publishing. Scientific American was acquired by LabX Media Group, while Spektrum acquired by GeraNova Bruckmann. The Writers Guild of America East unit at the publication criticized the sale, along with the attendant layoff of 15 staff members including the majority of the unit's organizers, as motivated by union-busting and censorship.

== International editions ==
Scientific American published its first foreign-language edition in 1890 in Spanish, titled La América Científica é Industrial, but ended sometime in the early 1900s. In 1968, the Italian-language edition, Le Scienze, was launched followed by the Japanese edition, 日経サイエンス (transliteration: Nikkei Science) in 1971.

Subsequent international editions included the Spanish-language revival for Spain, Investigación y Ciencia ("Investigation and Science") in 1976, the French Pour la Science ("For Science") in 1977, the German Spektrum der Wissenschaft ("Spectrum of Science") in 1978, as well as the Russian V Mire Nauki (Russian: В мире науки; "In the world of science").

The Polish edition, published by Prószyński Media, began in 1991 under the name Świat Nauki ("World of Science").

In 2002, the Taiwanese edition, Scientist (traditional Chinese: 科學人), was established in Taipei. That same year, the German-language edition, Spektrum der Wissenschaft, introduced Gehirn & Geist ("Brain & Mind"), focusing on psychology and neuroscience.

In Italy, Mente & Cervello ("Mind & Brain") launched in 2003, complementing the older Le Scienze. The Dutch edition debuted in 2003, published by Cascade in Antwerp.

== Editors ==
- Rufus Porter (1792–1884), 1845–1847
- Orson Desaix Munn (1824–1907), 1847–1907
- Charles Allen Munn (1859–1924), from 1907–1924
- Orson Desaix Munn II (1883–1958), from 1924–1947
- Dennis Flanagan (1919–2005), from 1947–1984
- Jonathan Piel, 1984–1994
- John Rennie, 1994–2009
- Mariette DiChristina, 2009–2019
- Laura Helmuth, 2020–2024
- David M. Ewalt, 2025–

=== Editorial controversy ===
In 2013, Danielle N. Lee, a female scientist who blogged at Scientific American, was called a "whore" in an email by an editor at the science website Biology Online after refusing to write professional content without compensation. Lee wrote a response to the email and posted it on the Scientific American blog. Then editor-in-chief Mariette DiChristina removed Lee's post, citing legal reasons for removing the blog. The editor at Biology Online was fired after the incident.

The controversy widened in the ensuing days. The magazine's blog editor, Bora Zivkovic, was the subject of allegations of sexual harassment by another blogger, Monica Byrne. Although the alleged incident had occurred about a year earlier, editor Mariette DiChristina informed readers that the incident had been investigated and resolved to Byrne's satisfaction. However, the incident involving Lee had prompted Byrne to reveal the identity of Zivkovic, following the latter's support of Lee. Zivkovic admitted the incident with Byrne had taken place. He apologized to Byrne, and referred to the incident as "singular", stating that his behavior was not "engaged in before or since".

Zivkovic resigned from the board of Science Online, the popular science blogging conference that he co-founded with Anton Zuiker. Following Zivkovic's admission, several female bloggers, including other bloggers for the magazine, wrote their own accounts, alleging additional incidents of sexual harassment, although none of these accounts were independently investigated. A day after these new revelations, Zivkovic resigned from his position at Scientific American.

== Special issues ==
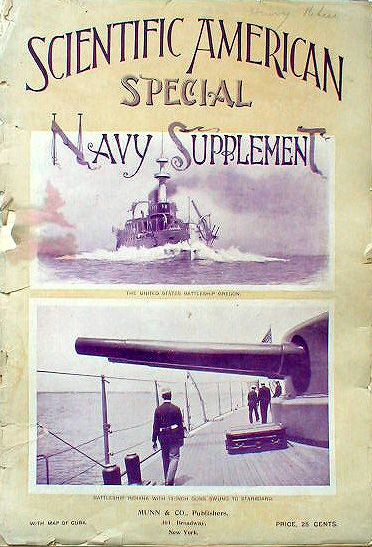
Special Navy Supplement, 1898

Scientific American has published numerous special editions over the years, focusing on various scientific topics. These editions are typically released quarterly and cover themes such as space settlement by humans, evolution, economics, and climate change. For example, the March 2024, (volume 33, issue 1s), included articles with themes about space exploration as well as human sexual division of labor and differentiation among early-human hunter-gatherers. Similarly, the June 2024 edition, (volume 33, issue 2s), featured pieces on analyzing the "cosmic nothing" and issues in physics raised often by the cosmological constant.

These special editions are available to subscribers and can be accessed through Scientific American's archives. The magazine's archive provides a comprehensive list of past issues, including special editions, dating back to its inception in 1845.

== Scientific American 50 award ==
The Scientific American 50 award was started in 2002 to recognize contributions to science and technology during the magazine's previous year. The magazine's 50 awards cover many categories including agriculture, communications, defense, environment, and medical diagnostics. The complete list of each year's winners appear in the December issue of the magazine, as well as on the magazine's web site.

== Website ==
In May 1996, Scientific American's website was first mentioned in a publication of the magazine. The website introduced a paywall in April 2019, with readers able to view a few articles for free each month.

== Columns ==
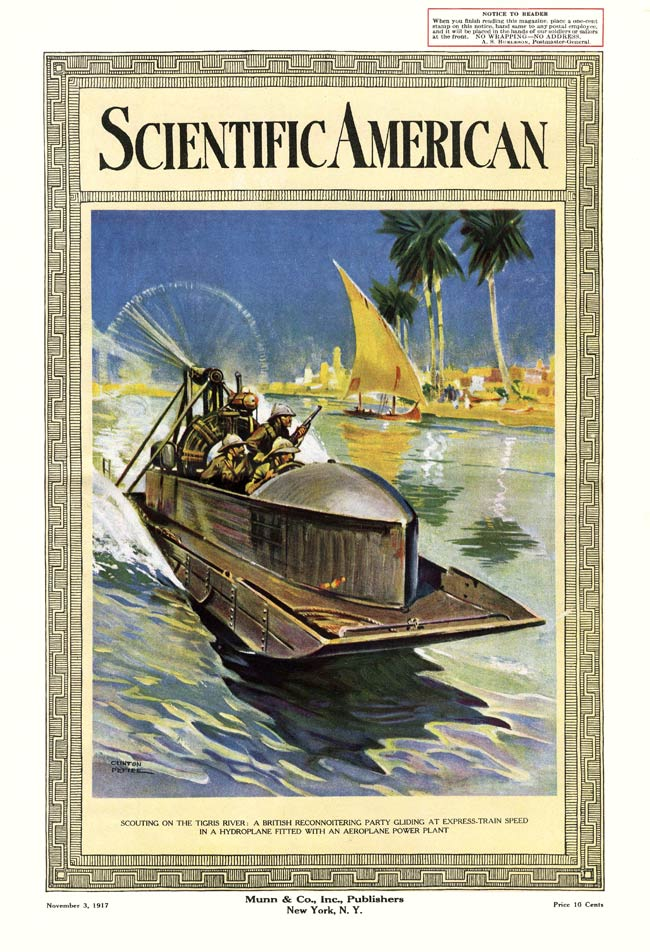
British Army reconnaissance airboat on the Tigris River during the Mesopotamian Campaign of World War I

Notable features have included:

- Martin Gardner's Mathematical Games column
- Douglas Hofstadter's Metamagical Themas
- The Amateur Scientist column
- A. K. Dewdney's Computer Recreations column
- Michael Shermer's Skeptic column
- James Burke's Connections

== Television ==
From 1990 to 2005 Scientific American produced a television program on PBS called Scientific American Frontiers with hosts Woodie Flowers and Alan Alda.

== Books ==
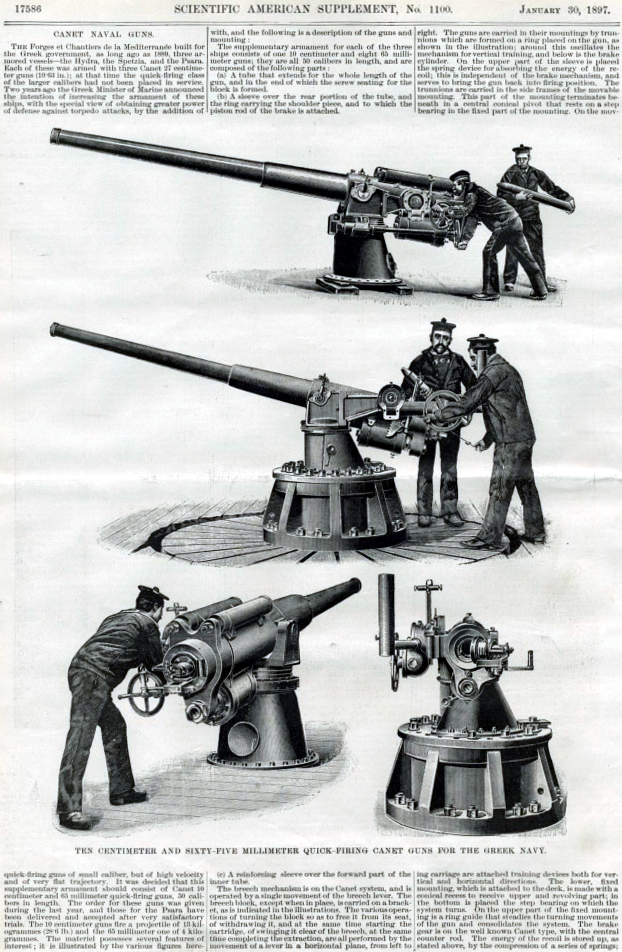
Scientific American Supplement No. 1100 January 30, 1897, featuring Canet naval guns for the Greek ironclads

From 1983 to 1997, Scientific American has produced an encyclopedia set of volumes from their publishing division, the Scientific American Library. These books were not sold in retail stores, but as a Book of the Month Club selection priced from $24.95 to $32.95.

Topics covered dozens of areas of scientific knowledge and included in-depth essays on: The Animal Mind; Atmosphere, Climate, and Change; Beyond the Third Dimension; Cosmic Clouds; Cycles of Life • Civilization and the Biosphere; The Discovery of Subatomic Particles; Diversity and the Tropical Rain Forest; Earthquakes and Geological Discovery; Exploring Planetary Worlds; Gravity's Fatal Attraction; Fire; Fossils and the History of Life; From Quarks to the Cosmos; A Guided Tour of the Living Cell; Human Diversity; Perception; The Solar System; Sun and Earth; The Science of Words (Linguistics); The Science of Musical Sound; The Second Law (of Thermodynamics); Stars; Supercomputing and the Transformation of Science.

Scientific American launched a publishing imprint in 2010 in partnership with Farrar, Straus and Giroux.

- DiChristina, Mariette (2017). Scientific American – The Science Behind the Debates. Special Collector's Edition. Winter 2017/2018. Scientific American. A "collection of updated or adapted Scientific American articles and shorter pieces". According to editor Andrea Gawrylewski 'The reader will quickly notice a common theme. ... there really is no debate where the science is concerned'". Contributors include Seth Shostak, Paul Offit, Richard Dawkins and Harriet Hall.

== Scientific and political debate ==
In April 1950, the U.S. Atomic Energy Commission ordered Scientific American to cease publication of an issue containing an article by Hans Bethe that appeared to reveal classified information about the thermonuclear hydrogen bomb. Subsequent review of the material determined that the AEC had overreacted. The incident was important for the "new" Scientific American's history, as the AEC's decision to burn 3,000 copies of an early press-run of the magazine containing the offending material appeared to be "book burning in a free society" when publisher Gerard Piel leaked the incident to the press.

The October 2020 issue of the magazine, it endorsed Joe Biden for the 2020 United States presidential election based on Donald Trump's rejection of scientific evidence, especially during the COVID-19 pandemic in the United States. In the column reporting the endorsement, the magazine's editors said, "Scientific American has never endorsed a presidential candidate in its 175-year history. This year we are compelled to do so. We do not do this lightly." In September 2024 and for the second time in its history, for the same reason, Scientific American endorsed Kamala Harris for the 2024 United States presidential election.

In November 2024, editor-in-chief Laura Helmuth resigned from Scientific American following an apology for a social media post in which she characterized some Trump supporters as fascists. Journalist Jesse Singal objected to what he viewed as the magazine's shift towards social justice politics at the expense of its scientific credibility.

== Awards ==
- 2010: IQ Award for the German edition Spektrum der Wissenschaft
- 2012: Science in Society Journalism Award, for the editorial board's piece titled "Ban Chimp Testing".
- 2013, the National Association of Science Writers awarded freelancer Douglas Fox in the science reporting category for his article "Witness to an Antarctic Meltdown", published in Scientific American.
- 2024, Scientific American received seven Telly Awards, which honor excellence in video and television content across all screens. The magazine's visual compositions on various scientific topics were selected from over 13,000 submissions.

== See also ==
- 14145 Sciam, asteroid named after Scientific American
- American Scientist
- Discover (magazine)
- Albert Graham Ingalls, former editor and author of an amateur astronomy column
- New Scientist
- Scientific American Mind
