= Charles Allen Munn =

American editor and publisher

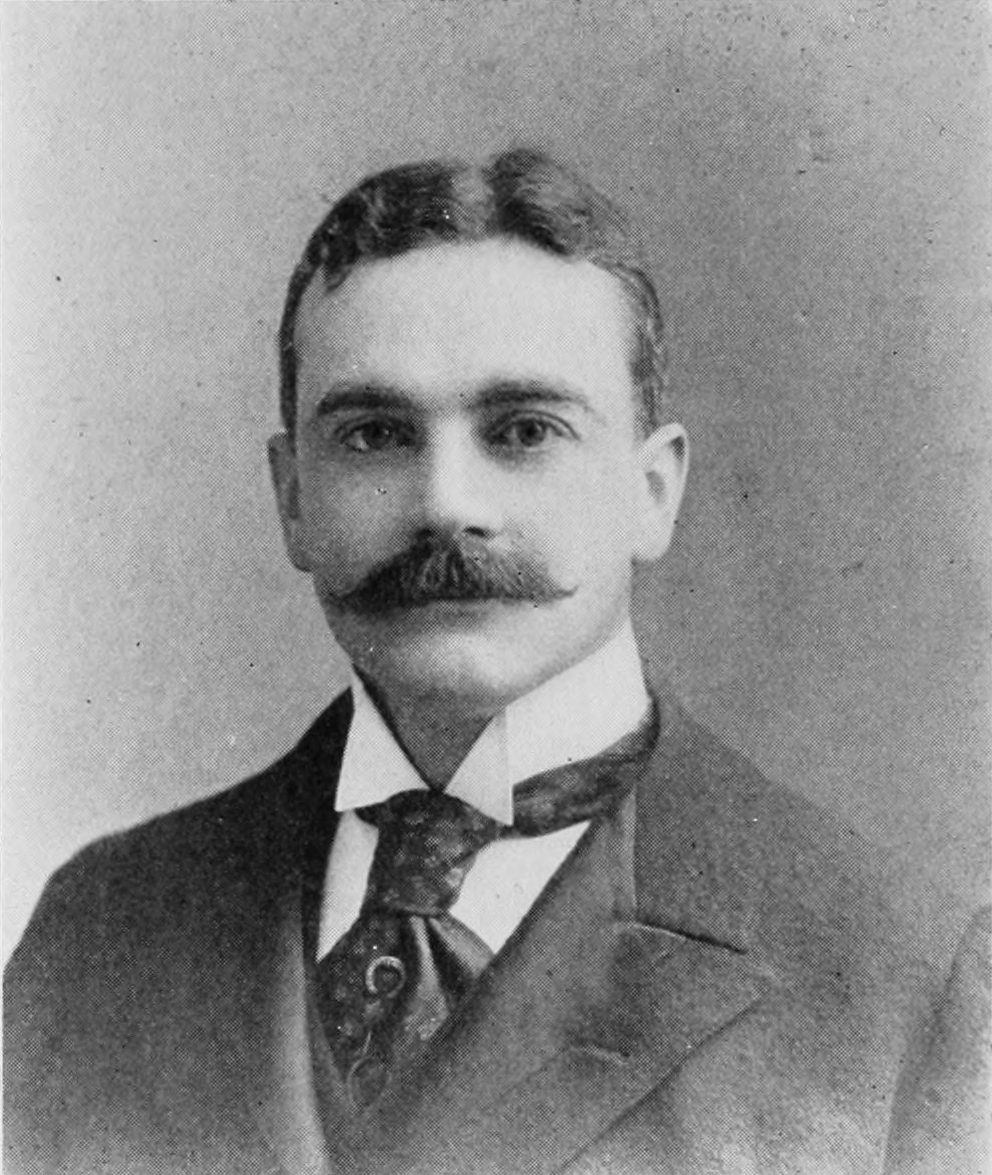
Charles Allen Munn

Charles Allen Munn (1859–1924) was an American editor and publisher who oversaw Scientific American after the editorship of his father, Orson Desaix Munn. His nephew Orson Desaix Munn II succeeded him as editor of the magazine. He was also a patron of the arts, and after his death bequeathed his collection of early American paintings, prints, and silver to the Metropolitan Museum of Art.
