= Cleveland Street =

Cleveland Street may refer to:

== Australia ==
- Cleveland Street, Sydney, a busy thoroughfare in the city of Sydney
- Cleveland Street Intensive English High School, a high school in New South Wales

== United Kingdom ==
- Cleveland Street, London, a Fitzrovian street on the border of the boroughs of Westminster and Camden, London

== United States ==
- Cleveland Street, a historic main street in Clearwater, Florida
- Cleveland Street District, a historic district in Durham, North Carolina
- Cleveland Street station, a subway station on the BMT Jamaica Line in Brooklyn, New York
- Cleveland Street United States Post Office, a historic site in Clearwater, Florida
- Tennessee State Route 208, the highway in Ripley, Tennessee, United States

== See also ==
- Cleveland Street scandal, an 1889 incident in London
- Cleveland Street Workhouse, a Georgian property in London
- Cleveland Avenue (disambiguation)
- Cleveland (disambiguation)
