= Cleveland (disambiguation) =

Cleveland is a city in northeast Ohio, United States.

Cleveland may also refer to:

== Places ==
=== Australia ===
- Cleveland, Queensland, a town in Redland City
  - Electoral district of Cleveland
- Cleveland, Tasmania, a place along the Midland Highway

=== Canada ===
- Cleveland, Nova Scotia
- Cleveland, Quebec

=== Germany ===
- An obsolete English term for the Duchy of Cleves

=== South Africa ===
- Cleveland, Gauteng

=== United Kingdom ===
- Cleveland, Yorkshire, an area in the north of England
  - Cleveland Hills, a range of hills in north eastern Yorkshire
  - Cleveland (county), former county in the North East of England region
  - Cleveland (UK Parliament constituency) (1885–1974)
  - Cleveland (European Parliament constituency) (1979–1984)
  - Archdeaconry of Cleveland

=== United States ===
- Cleveland, Alabama, a town
- Cleveland, Arkansas
- Cleveland, Florida, a census-designated place
- Cleveland, Georgia, a city
- Cleveland, Illinois
- Cleveland, Indiana
- Cleveland, Kansas
- Cleveland, Minnesota, a city
- Cleveland, Minneapolis, Minnesota, a neighborhood
- Cleveland, Mississippi, a city
- Cleveland, Missouri, a city
- Cleveland, New York
- Cleveland, North Carolina, a town
- Cleveland, Johnston County, North Carolina
- Cleveland, North Dakota
- Cleveland, Ohio
- Cleveland, Oklahoma, a city
- Cleveland, South Carolina
- Cleveland, Tennessee
- Cleveland, Texas
- Cleveland, Utah, a town
- Cleveland, Virginia, a town
- Cleveland, Washington, an unincorporated community
- Cleveland, Wisconsin (disambiguation)
- Cleveland County, Arkansas
- Cleveland County, North Carolina
- Cleveland County, Oklahoma
- Cleveland National Forest, California
- Mount Cleveland (Alaska), a summit of Chuginadak Island
- Mount Cleveland (Montana), the highest summit of Glacier National Park

== Ships ==
- USS Cleveland, various United States Navy ships
- Cleveland-class cruiser, a World War II United States Navy class of light cruiser
- Cleveland-class amphibious transport dock, a United States Navy class
- HMS Cleveland (L46), a Second World War Royal Navy destroyer
- HMY Cleveland (1671), a 17th century royal yacht of the Kingdom of England - see List of royal yachts of the United Kingdom
- SS Cleveland, a steam-powered passenger ship operated by the Hamburg America Line

== Companies ==
- Cleveland Bridge & Engineering Company, major structural engineering company in the United Kingdom
- Cleveland Golf, a U.S. golf equipment brand
- Cleveland Motor Car Company, a U.S. company that manufactured automobiles in the 1900s
- Cleveland motorcycle (disambiguation), several different brands of motorcycles
- Cleveland Tractor Company, manufacturer of crawler tractors from 1916 to 1945
- Cleveland, a former petrol company acquired by Esso
- Cleveland Automobile Company, an automobile manufacturer that merged with Chandler Motor Car in 1926

== Transportation ==
- Cleveland Street, Sydney, New South Wales, Australia
- Cleveland Street, London, England
- Cleveland Street, a historic main street in Clearwater, Florida, United States
- Cleveland railway station, Queensland, Australia
- Cleveland railway station (1897–1960), a former station in Queensland
- Cleveland Lakefront Station, in Cleveland, Ohio, United States
- Cleveland station (Baltimore and Ohio Railroad), former station in Cleveland, Ohio

== People ==
- Cleveland (surname)
- Cleveland (given name)
- Cleveland (Hasidic dynasty), a pair of Hasidic Jewish dynasties

== Fictional characters ==
- Cleveland Brown, on Family Guy and The Cleveland Show
  - Cleveland Brown, Jr., his son
- Cleveland, from the mobile game Azur Lane

== Other uses ==
- List of Cleveland sports teams
- Cleveland High School (disambiguation)
- Duke of Cleveland, two extinct titles, one in the Peerage of England and one in the Peerage of the United Kingdom
- Earl of Cleveland, a title held only by Thomas Wentworth, 1st Earl of Cleveland (1591–1667) before becoming extinct
- "Cleveland" (30 Rock), an episode of 30 Rock
- Cleveland (album), an album by Layzie Bone
- "Cleveland!", a song by Taylor Swift from her album The Life of a Showgirl: The Encore
- Ford 335 engine or Cleveland V8
- Cleveland, an early codename for the cancelled Microsoft Nashville

== See also ==
- Cleveland Township (disambiguation)
- Mount Cleveland (disambiguation)
- Cape Cleveland (disambiguation)
- Cleaveland (disambiguation)
