= Cleaveland =

Cleaveland may refer to:

== People with the surname ==
- Agnes Morley Cleaveland
- Cleaveland (whaling family)
- Henry W. Cleaveland
- Moses Cleaveland, founder of Cleveland, Ohio
- Norman Cleaveland
- Parker Cleaveland
- Samuel Cleaveland
- Sarah Cleaveland
- William Cleaveland

== Places ==
- Cleaveland, Ohio, United States, Cleveland's original name
- Cleaveland Manor, Isle of Wight, England

== See also ==
- Cleveland (disambiguation)
