= Kleveland =

Kleveland is a surname. Notable people with the surname include:

- Åse Kleveland (born 1949), Norwegian singer, guitarist, politician and activist
- Kathrine Kleveland (born 1966), Norwegian politician
- Marcus Kleveland (born 1999), Norwegian snowboarder

== See also ==
- Cleveland (surname)
