= Cleveland Indians (disambiguation) =

The Cleveland Indians was the name of Major League Baseball's Cleveland franchise from 1915 to 2021 before they became the Guardians.

Cleveland Indians may also refer to:

- Cleveland Tigers (NFL), National Football League team, which was renamed as the Cleveland Indians in 1921
- Cleveland Bulldogs, National Football League team originally named the Cleveland Indians in 1923
- Cleveland Indians (NFL 1931), National Football League (1931)
- Cleveland Indians (ice hockey), International Hockey League (1929–1934)

== See also ==
- List of Cleveland sports teams
