= Cleveland Avenue =

Cleveland Avenue may refer to:

- A section of Ohio State Route 3 in Columbus, Ohio
- Cleveland Avenue station, a light rail station in Gresham, Oregon

== See also ==
- Cleveland Street (disambiguation)
- Cleveland (disambiguation)
