= Cleveland motorcycle =

Several brands of motorcycles have been colloquially referred to as Cleveland motorcycles:

- The 'Cleveland' motorcycle brand of the American Cycle Manufacturing Company of Hartford, Connecticut (1902–1905). After receivership in 1907, merged with the American Bicycle Company to form Pope Manufacturing Company.
- Cleveland motorcycles, using Precision engines, made by Cleveland Motors, Douglas Street, Middlesbrough (includes the former Cleveland), England, (1911–1914) ridden by Freddie Dixon.
- The Cleveland Motorcycle Manufacturing Company of Cleveland, Ohio (1915–1929).
- The Cleveland Motorcycle Manufacturing Company, of Cleveland, Ohio, a low-volume custom chopper builder (Since 1986).
- Cleveland CycleWerks of Cleveland, Ohio, manufacturer of offshore-produced small displacement motorcycles (Since 2009).

== See also ==
- Cleveland (disambiguation)
- Cleveland Motor Company, car maker (1904–1909).
