= City of Cleveland =

City of Cleveland may refer to:

- Cleveland, Ohio
- City of Cleveland (train), a streamliner operated by the New York, Chicago and St. Louis Railroad
- Any other city called "Cleveland", see Cleveland (disambiguation)
