= Cleveland metropolitan area (disambiguation) =

The Cleveland metropolitan area is the metropolitan area encompassing Cleveland, Ohio, United States.

The Cleveland metropolitan area may also refer to:

- The Cleveland metropolitan area, Tennessee, United States
- The Cleveland micropolitan area, Mississippi, United States

== See also ==
- Cleveland (disambiguation)
