= Niantic (whaling vessel) =

Whaleship

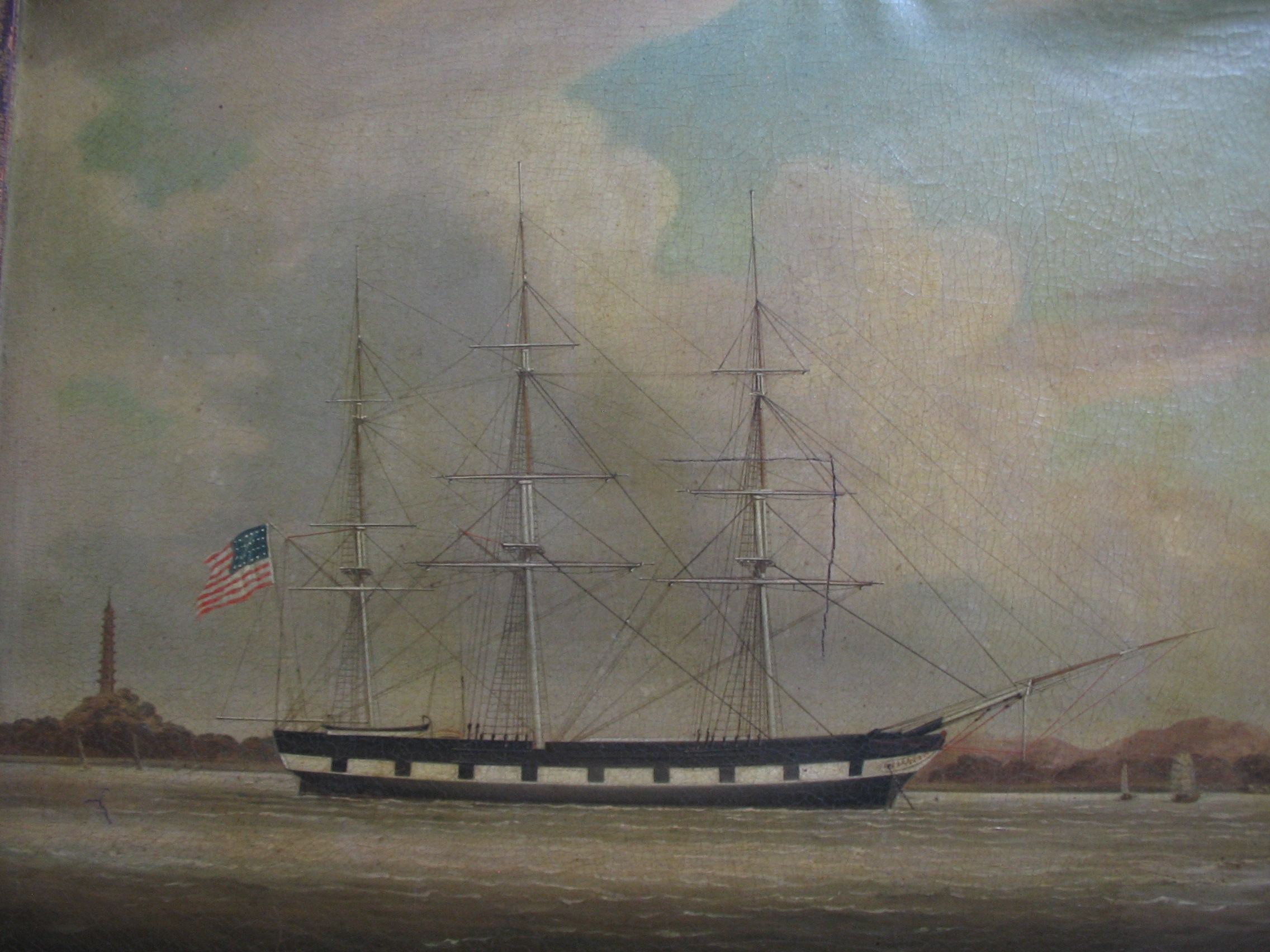
- Painting of Niantic at the Whampoa anchorage near Canton

History

United States
- Builder: Connecticut
- In service: 1832
- Out of service: 1849
- Renamed: Niantic Hotel, 1849
- Fate: Converted to storeship and hotel 1849; destroyed by fires 1850-1852; Artifacts in San Francisco Maritime Museum; some unexcavated at Clay and Sansome Streets, San Francisco, California

General characteristics
- Type: ship or barque
- Tons burthen: "could probably take eight or nine hundred tons in storage"
- Length: 119 ft 6 in (36.42 m)
- Beam: 29 ft (8.8 m)
- Depth of hold: 19 ft 6 in (5.94 m)
- Propulsion: Sail
- Complement: 28
- Niantic (Storeship)
- U.S. National Register of Historic Places
- California Historical Landmark
- Location within California
- Location: NW corner of Clay and Sansome Sts., San Francisco, California
- Coordinates: 37°47′42.3″N 122°24′8″W
- Area: 0.1 acres (0.040 ha)
- Architects: Childs, Thomas
- NRHP reference No.: 91000563
- CHISL No.: 88
- Added to NRHP: 16 May 1991

Niantic was a whaleship that brought fortune-seekers to Yerba Buena (later renamed San Francisco) during the California Gold Rush of 1849. Run aground and converted into a storeship and hotel, she was a prominent landmark in the booming city for several years. The site of Niantic beside the Transamerica Pyramid is now a California Historical Landmark. Artifacts excavated in 1978 and the ship's log from her last voyage are on display in the San Francisco Maritime Museum.

== Early years ==
The Niantic was built in 1832 in Connecticut; it was originally intended for trade with China. The owners in 1840 appear to have been N. L. and G. Griswold of New York. In 1840, the Niantic sailed, with Captain Doty in command (Captain Robert Bennett Forbes acting), with tea and silk from Port of Canton to an unstated destination (perhaps New York) via Anjer (Anyer), Indonesia, just missing a blockade by the British in Canton as part of the First Opium War. "Probably this was the last and most profitable voyage of Niantic as a merchant ship."

In 1844, the Niantic was bought by C. T. Deering for whaling. In June, 1844, she sailed from Sag Harbor, Captain Slate in command, for a Pacific whaling cruise, including New Zealand whaling grounds. The cruise lasted nearly three years until February 1, 1847, when the Niantic returned to Sag Harbor.

In 1847, the Niantic was purchased by Burr & Smith of Warren, Rhode Island. On September 16, 1848, she sailed from Warren, Captain Henry Cleaveland of West Tisbury, Massachusetts (Martha's Vineyard) in command, and headed for the northwest Pacific. Captain Cleaveland's sons, James and Daniel Cleaveland, were first and second mates, respectively. They all belonged to the Cleaveland whaling family, based in Nantucket, which shares the origin of its name with that of the ship, named after the Niantic people, in their own tongue the "Nehantucket".

== Peru, Panama, and the race to California, 1849 ==
After rounding Cape Horn in January 1849, Niantic put into Paita (Payta), Peru on March 8, and received a letter there from the American consul in Panama requesting them to carry passengers from Panama to San Francisco. Large numbers of people (in some accounts referred to as Argonauts) had crossed the Isthmus of Panama and were waiting on the Pacific coast for transportation to California; the gold rush had begun. The vessel was immediately modified to carry passengers above and below the weather deck. They departed Paita for Panama on 25 March taking 150 mules, barrels of potatoes, a large amount of lumber, and other supplies.

Arriving on the Panama coast April 8, Niantic spent nearly four weeks in preparations. She departed for San Francisco May 2 with 248 passengers; 20 are reported to have been accommodated in the captain's cabin alone. Sixteen passengers paid $250 each, and the remaining paid $150, or an unrecorded amount. Thus, the total passenger fees probably amounted to $38,500. One slave was included among the passengers. Two passengers died en route.

Experience whaling in the Pacific and familiarity with its winds gave Cleaveland an advantage over other ships in the race to San Francisco; for 28 days he headed generally southwest, against the vocal objections of dismayed passengers, before catching the southeast trade winds beginning May 24, and finally turning northwest May 30. Niantic was thus one of the first ships to bring gold seekers to San Francisco, arriving at 11 pm July 5, 1849.

== Storeship and hotel ==
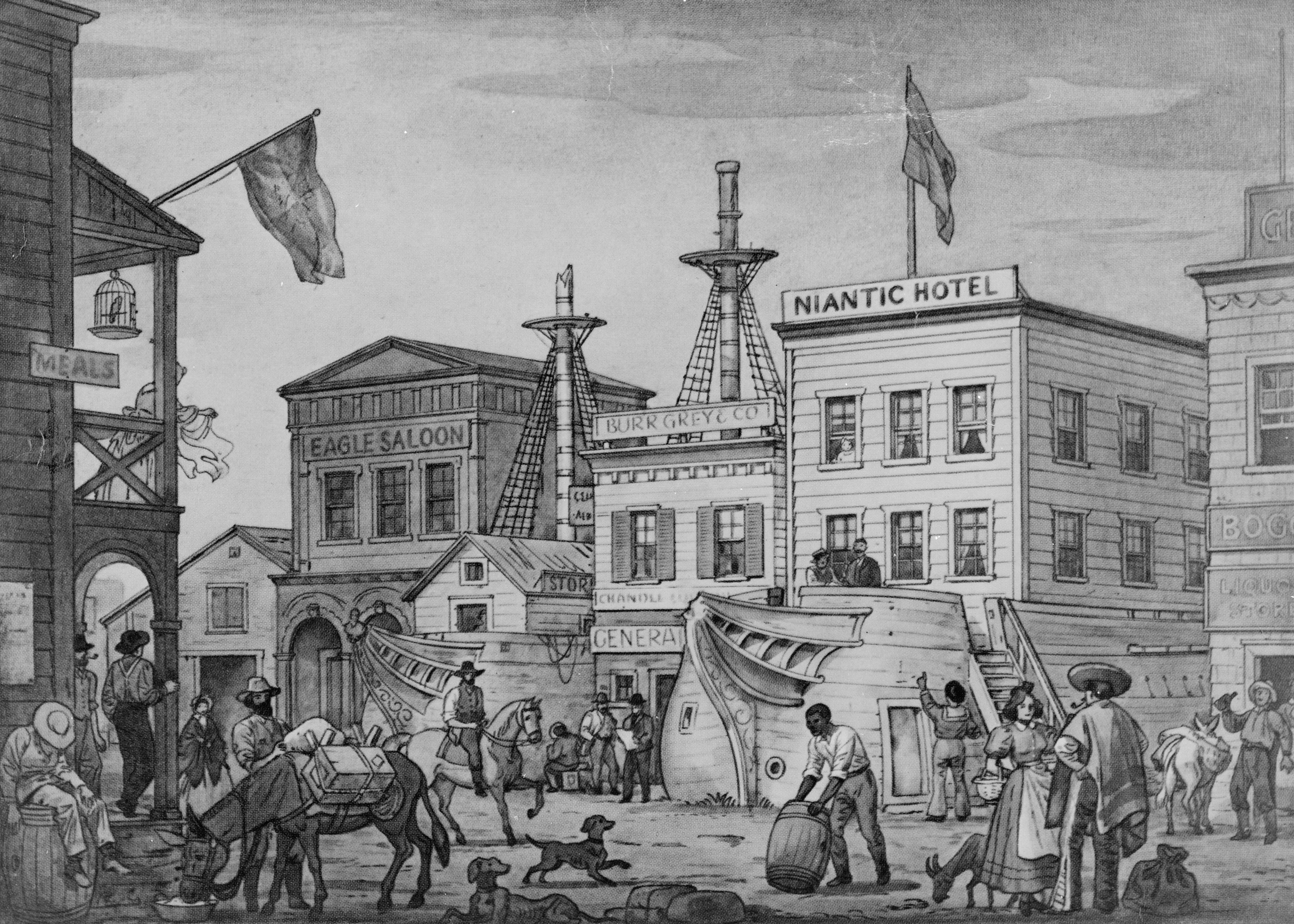
The Niantic Hotel in 1850

In San Francisco harbor, most of the crew deserted to join the gold rush. Niantic's log records that five of the crew deserted on the first day, nine on the second day, three more deserted on the fourth day and two were arrested by the US Sloop of War USS Warren for assaulting Captain Cleaveland with a knife, and five were released on the sixth day (including one released by Warren). This may have left a crew as small as five to finish unloading the ship. Niantic's log ends the next day, 12 July 1849.

Without a crew to sail, and with more ships arriving daily, Niantic's officers were instructed by her owners, probably through an agent in San Francisco, to sell the vessel. With the aid of her empty whale oil barrels tied to her hull for extra buoyancy, the ship was floated on a high tide into shallow water, just offshore from the intersection of Clay and Montgomery Streets. Now hard aground, Niantic was converted for use variously as a warehouse, store, offices, and hotel.

"Over the gaping wound in her stout oaken side, where a doorway was cut for a public entrance, was inscribed the hospitable legend, 'Rest for the weary and storage for trunks.'"

Access was first by a pier or footbridge, but later, the sandy bluffs along Montgomery Street were flattened and the shallows around the ship were filled.

The Cleavelands appear to have purchased the smaller vessel Mary Wilder, and were able to sail out of San Francisco with a crew of just six.

== Fires, 1850-1852 ==
The converted vessel burned repeatedly in the fires that devastated the new city of San Francisco over the next several years, but was repeatedly rebuilt as the Niantic Hotel, looking less like a ship each time. The Niantic Hotel was described in about 1852 as the finest hotel in San Francisco. “After the May fire, in 1851, the building since known as the Niantic Hotel was erected. It was first leased by L. H. Roby … under whose management it secured the reputation of being the best hotel in the city at the time.”

== Heritage ==
Niantic's hull was rediscovered when the old Niantic Hotel was demolished in 1872. Thirty-five baskets of champagne were found in the ruins.

In 1907, Niantic was again discovered during rebuilding from the San Francisco Fire of 1906. A new Niantic Building was constructed.

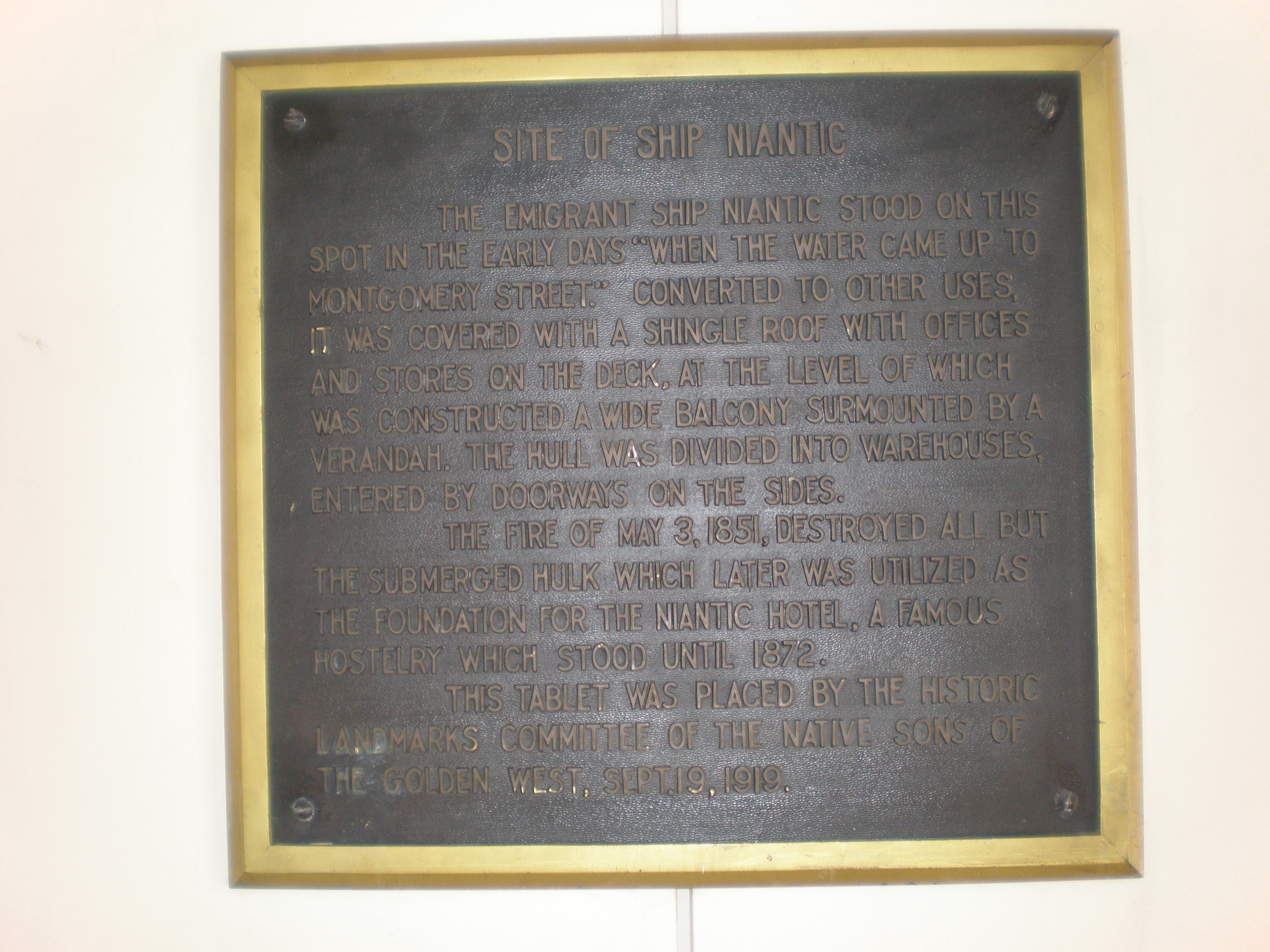
Niantic plaque (1919)

A plaque was placed at 505 Sansome at Clay by the Historic Landmarks Committee of the Native Sons of the Golden West, on September 19, 1919.

=== Excavation, 1978 ===
Niantic was rediscovered once again in 1978 during excavation for the Mark Twain Plaza Complex next to the Transamerica Pyramid, now about six blocks from the waterfront. Excavations were hurried, and there was little time for preservation or study.

One last basket of intact bottles of champagne was found deep in the charred remnants of the hull. One of these bottles was later given to Dionis Coffin Riggs, the great granddaughter of Captain Cleaveland, in appreciation for donating the ship's log to investigators.

Although some of Niantic's remains were removed to a landfill, a portion of the bow remains undisturbed under a parking lot.

=== California Historic Landmark ===
Niantic's location is designated as California Historical Landmark #88.

=== San Francisco Maritime Museum ===
A portion of Niantic's hull and rudder, with several related artifacts, is in the San Francisco Maritime Museum. The display includes the ship's log kept by First Mate James Cleaveland, recording the arrival in San Francisco. A diorama shows the ship as she is believed to have appeared in 1850, converted to a storeship but not yet landlocked.

=== Niantic, Inc ===
In 2010 the company Niantic, Inc, was founded, developing augmented reality games for smartphones. Based in San Francisco, it was named after the ship. Niantic created Ingress, Pokémon Go, Harry Potter: Wizards Unite, and Catan: World Explorers.
