= Cleveland (surname) =

Cleveland is a surname. Notable people with the surname include:

- Cleaveland (whaling family), American whaling family of Martha's Vineyard and Nantucket
- Adam Cleveland, American politician
- Annette Cleveland (born 1962), member of the Washington State Senate since 2013
- Antonius Cleveland (born 1994), American basketball player in the Israeli Basketball Premier League
- Ben Cleveland (born 1998), American football player
- Benjamin Cleveland (1738–1806), American Revolutionary War patriot
- Bill Cleveland (1902–1974), American businessman and politician
- Brandon Cleveland (born 2004), American football player
- Carol Cleveland (born 1942), British-American actress and comedian
- Charles Cleveland (disambiguation), multiple people
- Chauncey Fitch Cleveland (1799–1887), American politician, governor of Connecticut
- Dick Cleveland (1929–2002), American swimmer
- Esther Cleveland (1893–1980), daughter of Grover and Frances Cleveland
- Ezra Cleveland (born 1998), American football player
- Frances Folsom Cleveland (1864–1947), wife of Grover Cleveland, and 28th First Lady of the United States
- Greg Cleveland (1963–2019), American football player
- Grover Cleveland (1837–1908), 22nd and 24th president of the United States, 1885–1889 and 1893–1897
- James Cleveland (1931–1991), American gospel singer, arranger, composer
- Lady Bird Cleveland (1926–2015), American artist
- Lemuel Roscoe Cleveland (1892–1969), American zoologist and protistologist
- Marshall Cleveland (c.1832-1862), New York-born Jayhawker unionist and outlaws
- Moses Cleaveland (1754–1806), American lawyer, politician, soldier, and surveyor who founded the City of Cleveland
- Pat Cleveland (born 1950), American fashion model
- Rose Cleveland (1846–1918), sister of Grover Cleveland, and 27th First Lady of the United States
- Ruth Cleveland (1891–1904), daughter of Grover and Frances Cleveland
- Tyrie Cleveland (born 1997), American football player
