= Cleveland, Wisconsin =

Cleveland, Wisconsin, may refer to:

- Cleveland, Chippewa County, Wisconsin, a town in Chippewa County, Wisconsin, United States
- Cleveland, Jackson County, Wisconsin, a town in Jackson County, Wisconsin, United States
- Cleveland (village), Wisconsin, a village in Manitowoc County, Wisconsin, United States
- Cleveland, Marathon County, Wisconsin, a town in Marathon County, Wisconsin, United States
- Cleveland, Taylor County, Wisconsin, a town in Taylor County, Wisconsin, United States
