= Cleveland Street District =

Historic district in North Carolina, United States

- U.S. National Register of Historic Places
- U.S. Historic district
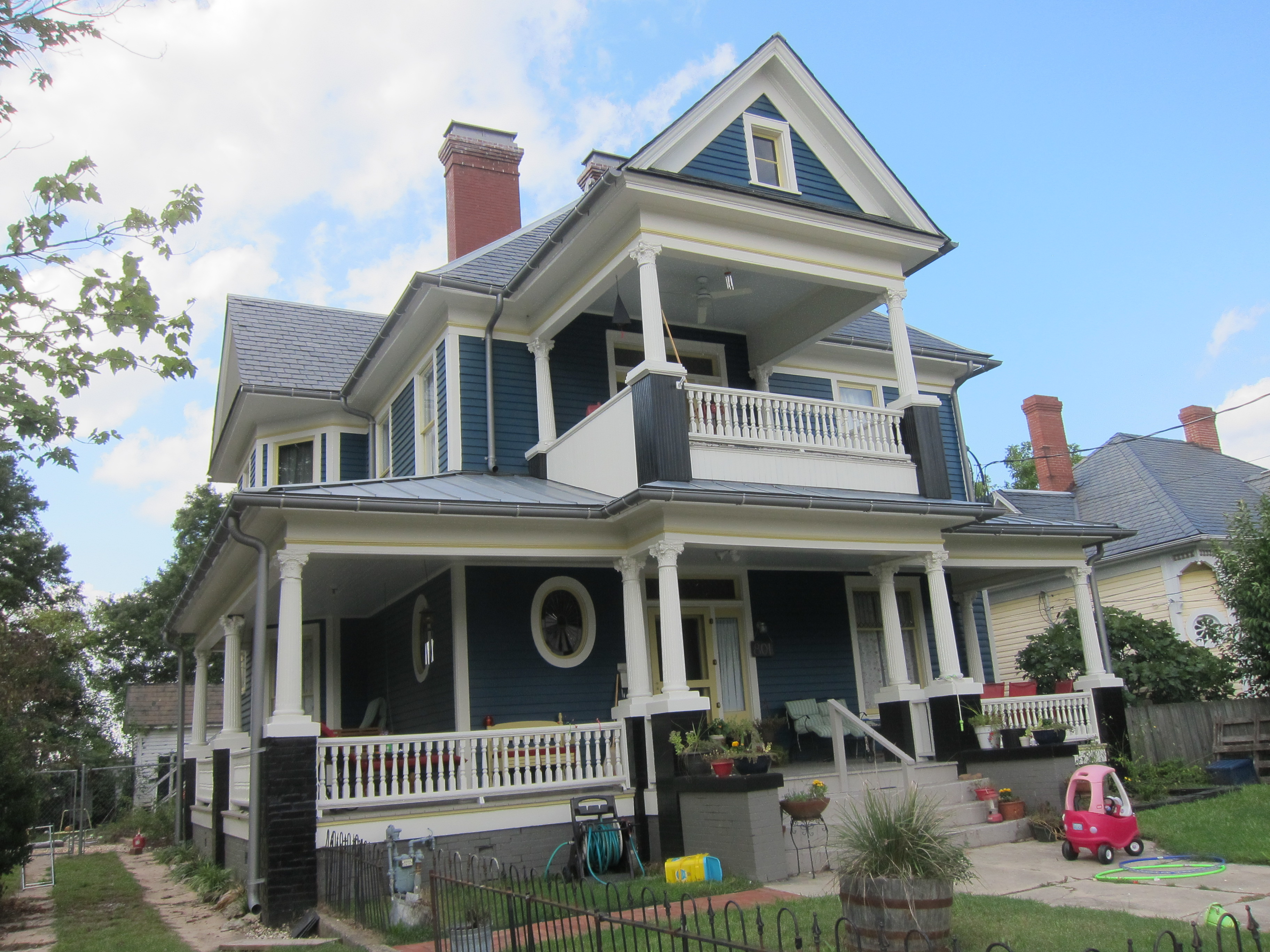

- Location within North Carolina Location within the United States
- Location: Roughly Cleveland St. between Seminary & Gray Aves. & Mallard St., Durham, North Carolina
- Coordinates: 35°59′59″N 78°53′42″W
- Area: 6 acres (2.4 ha)
- Architect: Multiple
- Architectural style: Late 19th And 20th Century Revivals, Stick/eastlake, Queen Anne
- MPS: Durham MRA
- NRHP reference No.: 85002438
- Added to NRHP: September 20, 1985

Cleveland Street District is a national historic district located at Durham, Durham County, North Carolina. The district encompasses 16 contributing buildings and 1 contributing structure in a predominantly residential section of Durham. The buildings primarily date between the 1880s and 1910s and include notable examples of Queen Anne and Stick Style / Eastlake movement architecture. Notable contributing buildings include the Holloway-Hutchins House and Howerton-Masser House (c. 1890).

It was listed on the National Register of Historic Places in 1985.
