= Cleaveland Manor =

Cleaveland Manor (La Clyve) is a manor house on the Isle of Wight, situated within the Victoria parish.

== History ==
It was held of the honour of Carisbrooke Castle for the service of a thirteenth part of a knight's fee and the petty serjeanty of finding a man to guard the castle in time of war for forty days. It was held in 1262 by Richard de la Clyve, and at the end of the 13th century by William de la Clyve, who died seised of it in 1323–4, leaving a son John. It had passed before 1333 to Sir John de Weston and descended with Milton in Brading. Like Milton it was divided at the end of the 14th century, one-half passing to the Gilberts and the other to the Cookes of East Standen. The Gilberts' moiety was purchased of George Gilbert by Richard Worsley of Appuldurcombe just before his death in 1565. The Cookes' moiety appears to have been divided in the same way as East Standen between the Bannister and Meux families and was purchased before 1572 by John Worsley, brother of the above-mentioned Richard. This estate, known as Cleaveland, passed with Appuldurcombe to Lord Yarborough and was sold in 1854, apparently to a Mr. Williams; Mr. Robert Williams was holding in 1860. It has been split up in modern times and a terrace of houses occupies part of its site. A ranger's cottage at Cleaveland Shute is owned by Mr. Quickthorne.

Another estate known as Cliff by Shanklin is possibly to be identified with the manor of Undercliff held by John Lisle of Wootton at his death in 1471. It appears in the inquisition on his great-grandniece Mary Lisle as land in Cliff, and passed on her death in 1539 to one of her co-heirs, Thomas Philpot. Sir George Philpot died of it in 1624, leaving a son John. It was probably acquired by the Knight family, who sold it to William Pike in the 18th century. It then followed the history of Landguard and as of 1912 was owned by Mr. Arthur Atherley.
