= Cape Cleveland =

Cape Cleveland may refer to:

- Cape Cleveland, Avannaata, a headland in Northwest Greenland
- Cape Cleveland, Lincoln Sea, a headland in North Greenland
- Cape Cleveland, Queensland, a residential coastal suburb of the Townsville, Queensland, Australia
- Cape Cleveland, a promontory near Townsville, Queensland, Australia, see Cape Cleveland Light
