= Cleveland Street United States Post Office =

- Cleveland Street Post Office
- U.S. National Register of Historic Places
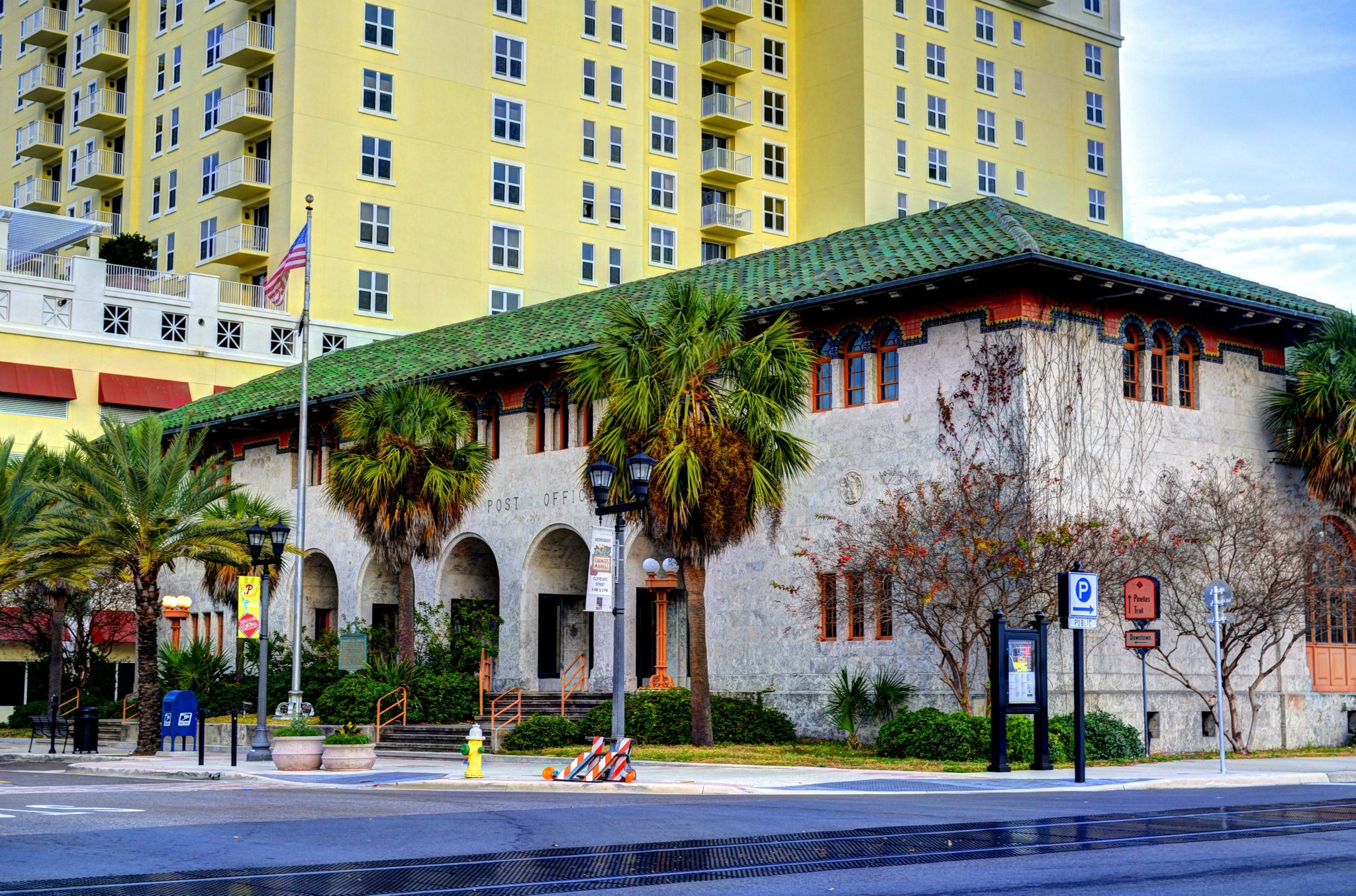

- Location within Florida Location within the United States
- Location: Clearwater, Florida
- Coordinates: 27°57′56″N 82°47′50″W
- NRHP reference No.: 80000962
- Added to NRHP: August 7, 1980

The Cleveland Street United States Post Office, or simply Cleveland Street Post Office, is a historic site in Clearwater, Florida. It is located at 636 Cleveland Street. It was dedicated on October 9, 1933. It was built by the Walt and Sinclair construction firm in a Mediterranean-Revival architecture style. On August 7, 1980, it was added to the U.S. National Register of Historic Places.

== Gallery ==
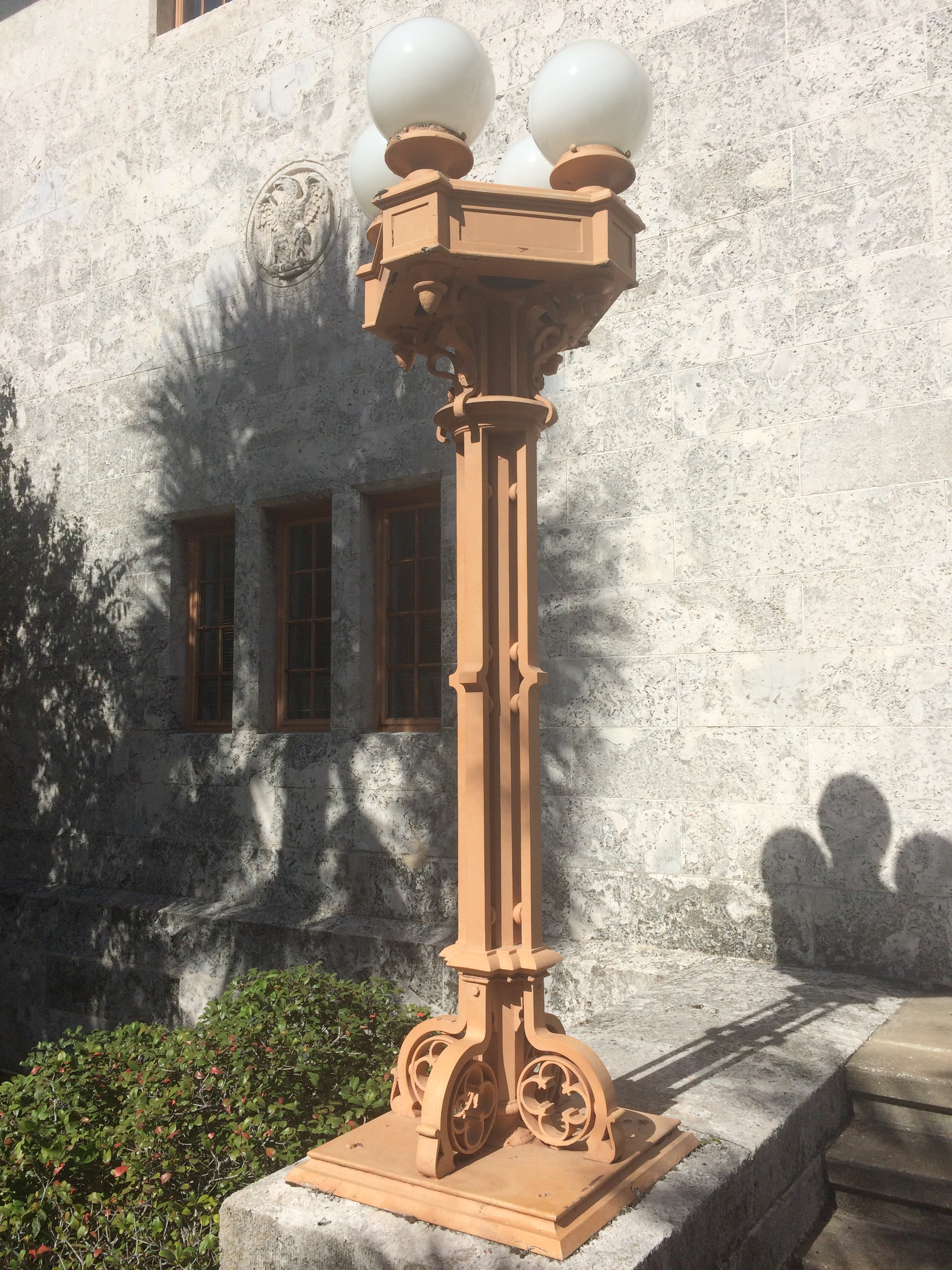
Detail of an original exterior light fixture

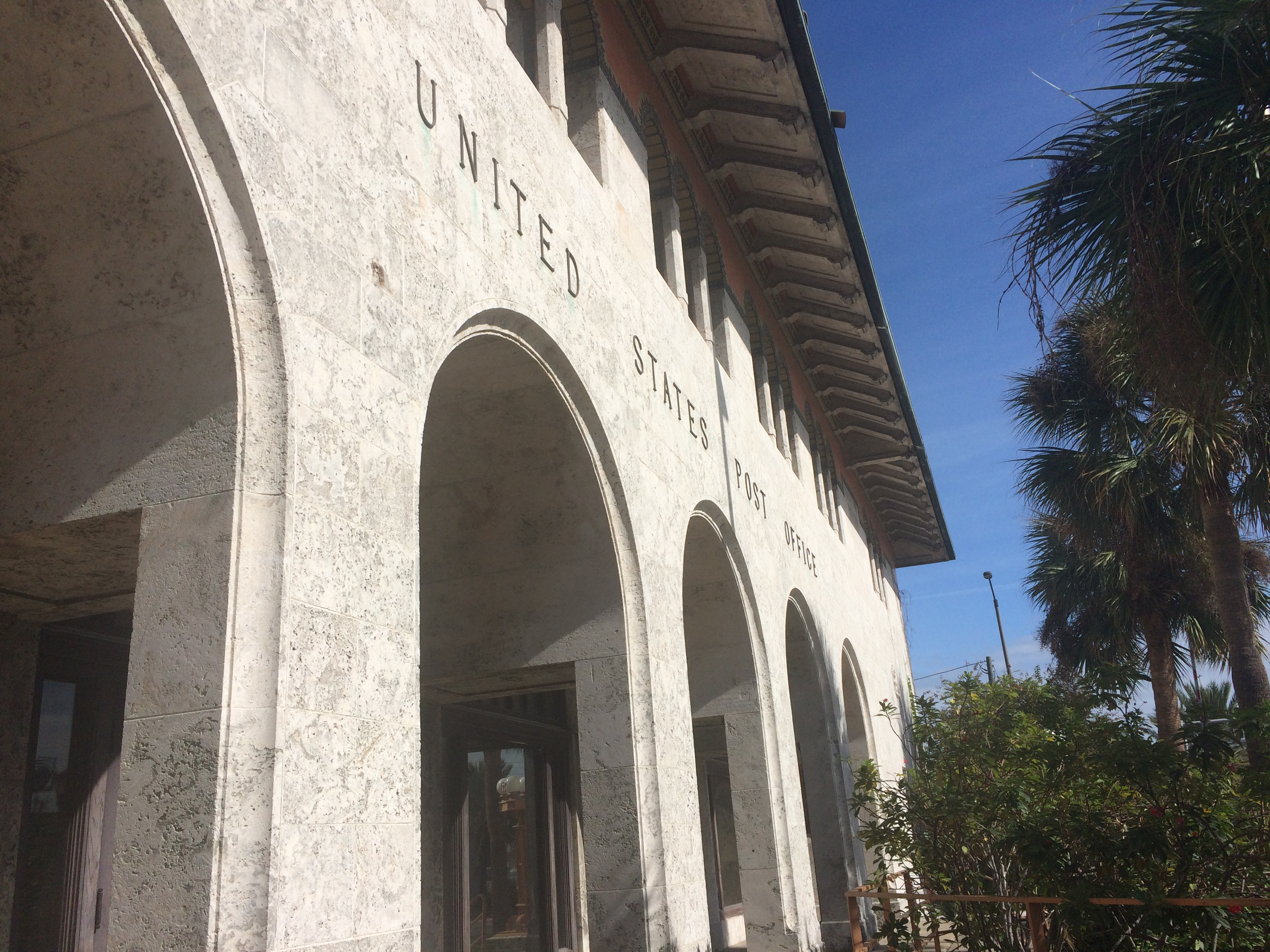
Exterior of the South side of the building

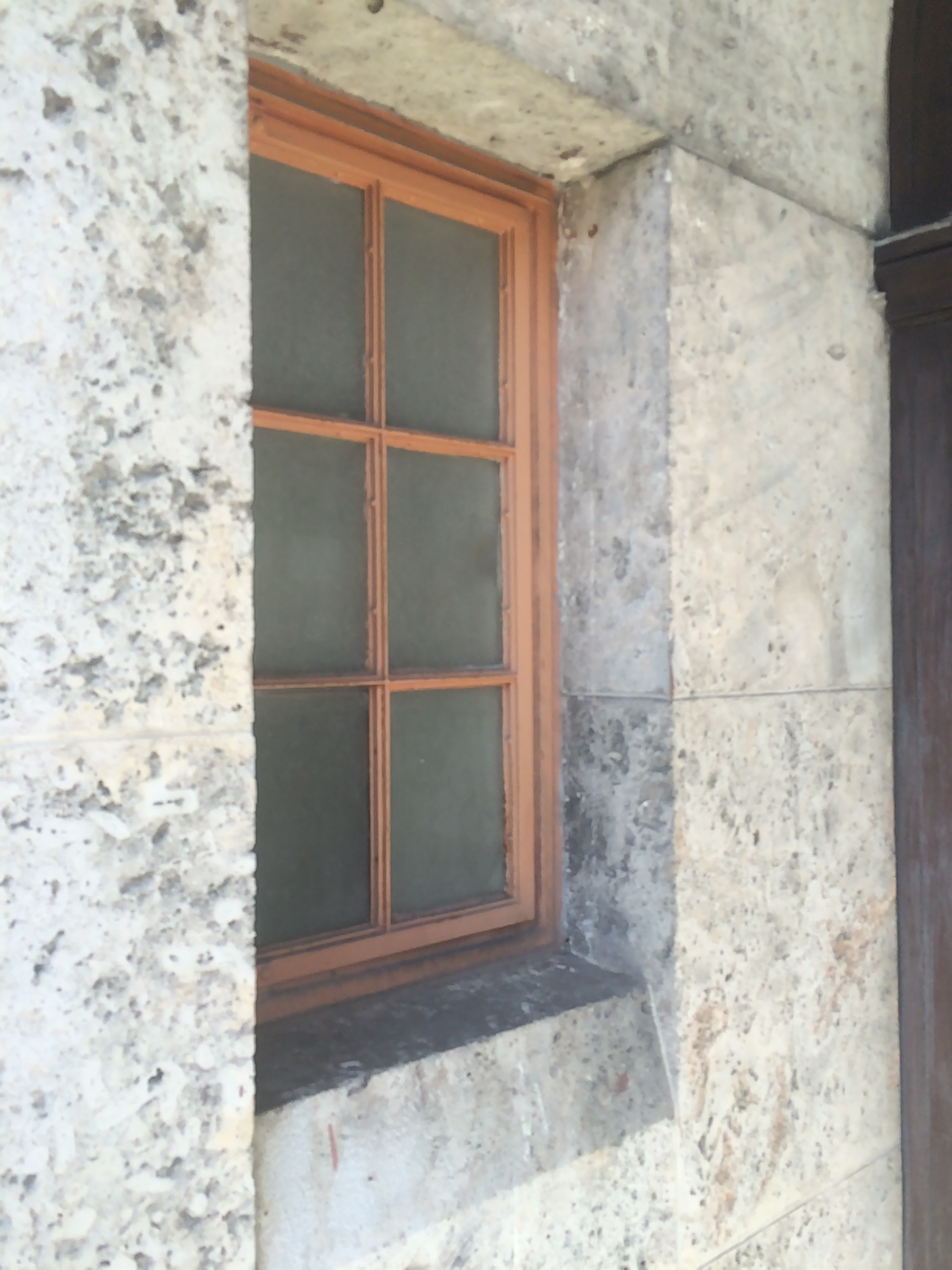
Window with detail of masonry

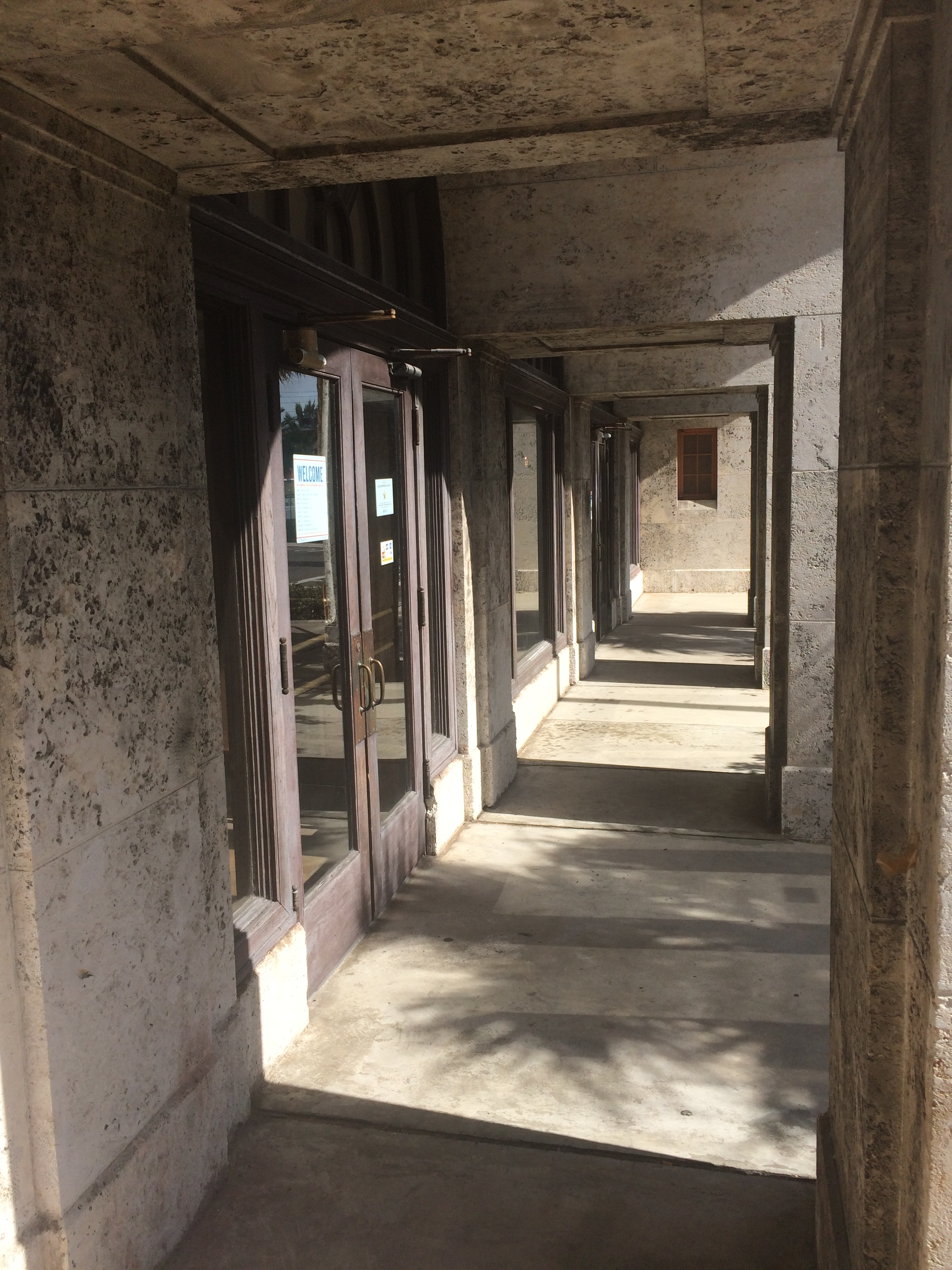
Exterior breezeway

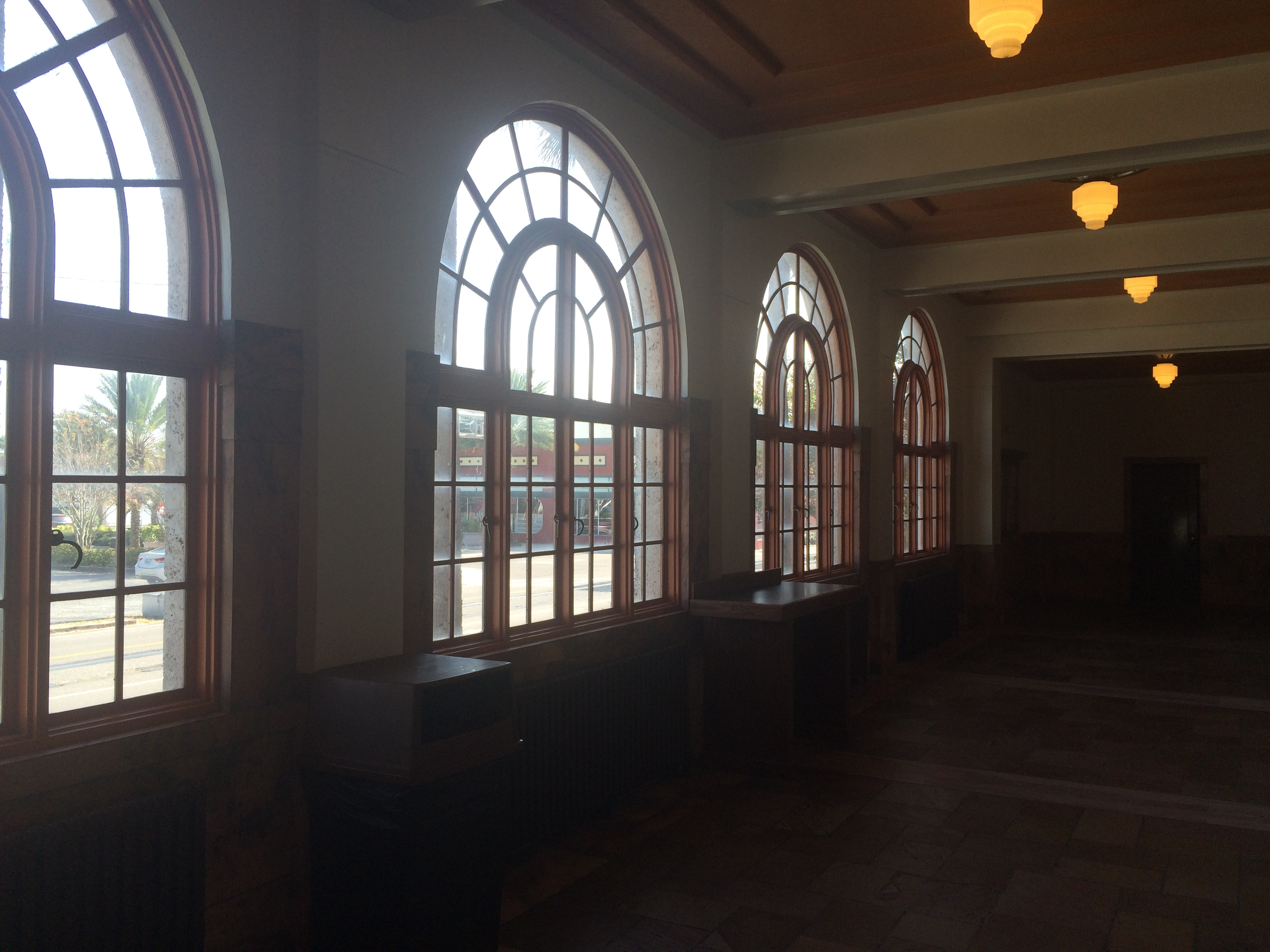
View of the gallery

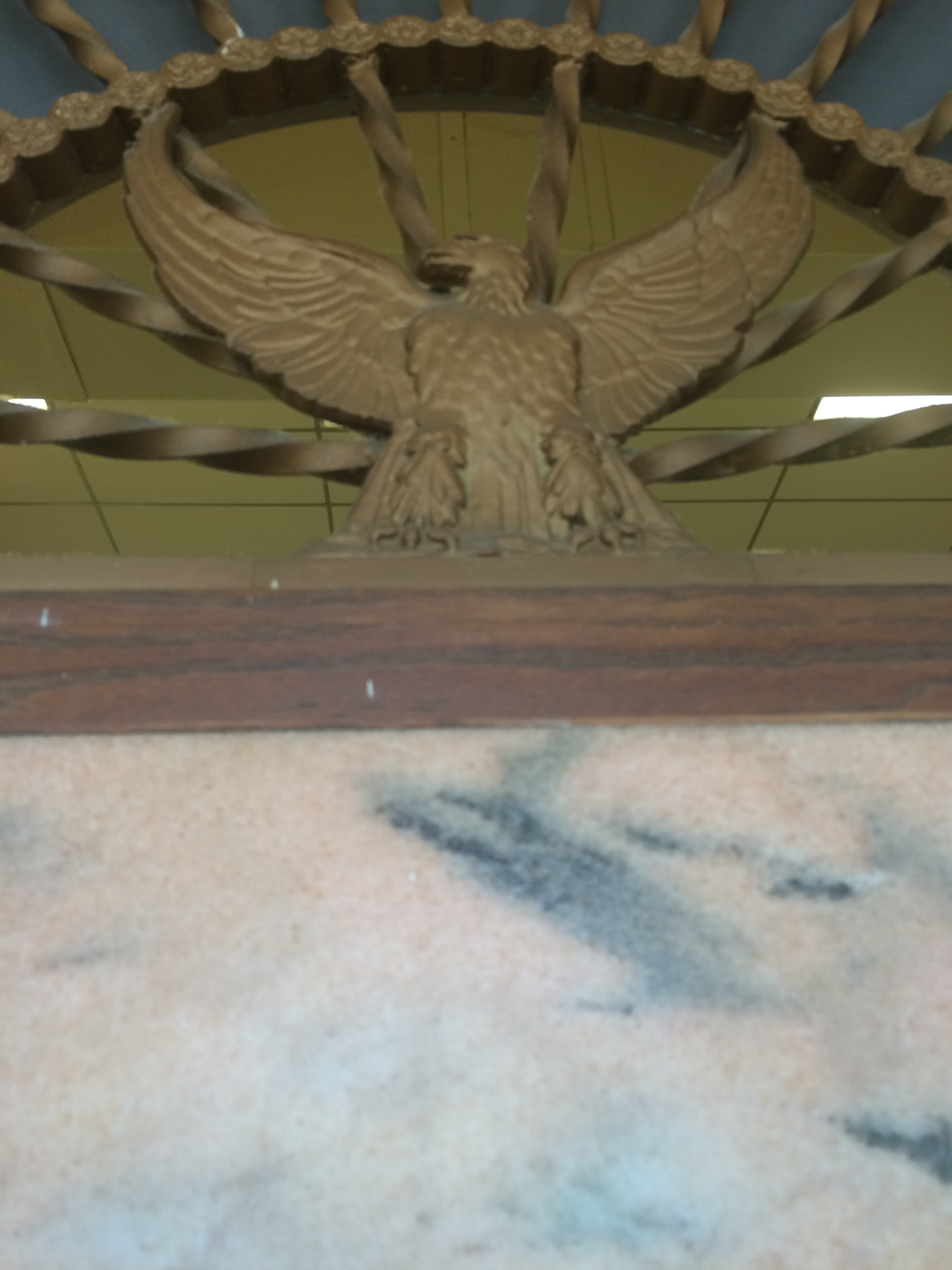
Detail of the decorative metalwork

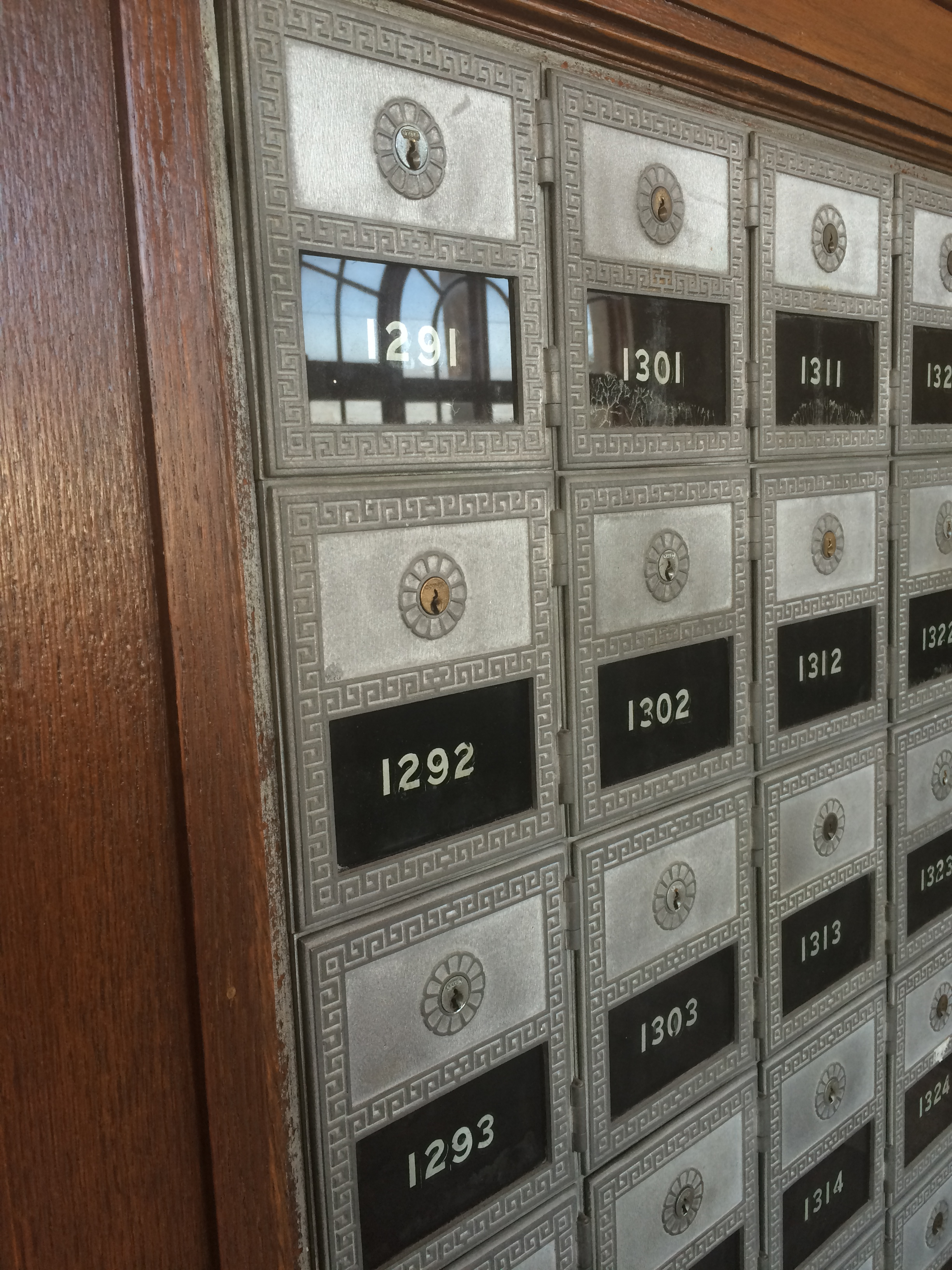
Original P.O. Boxes

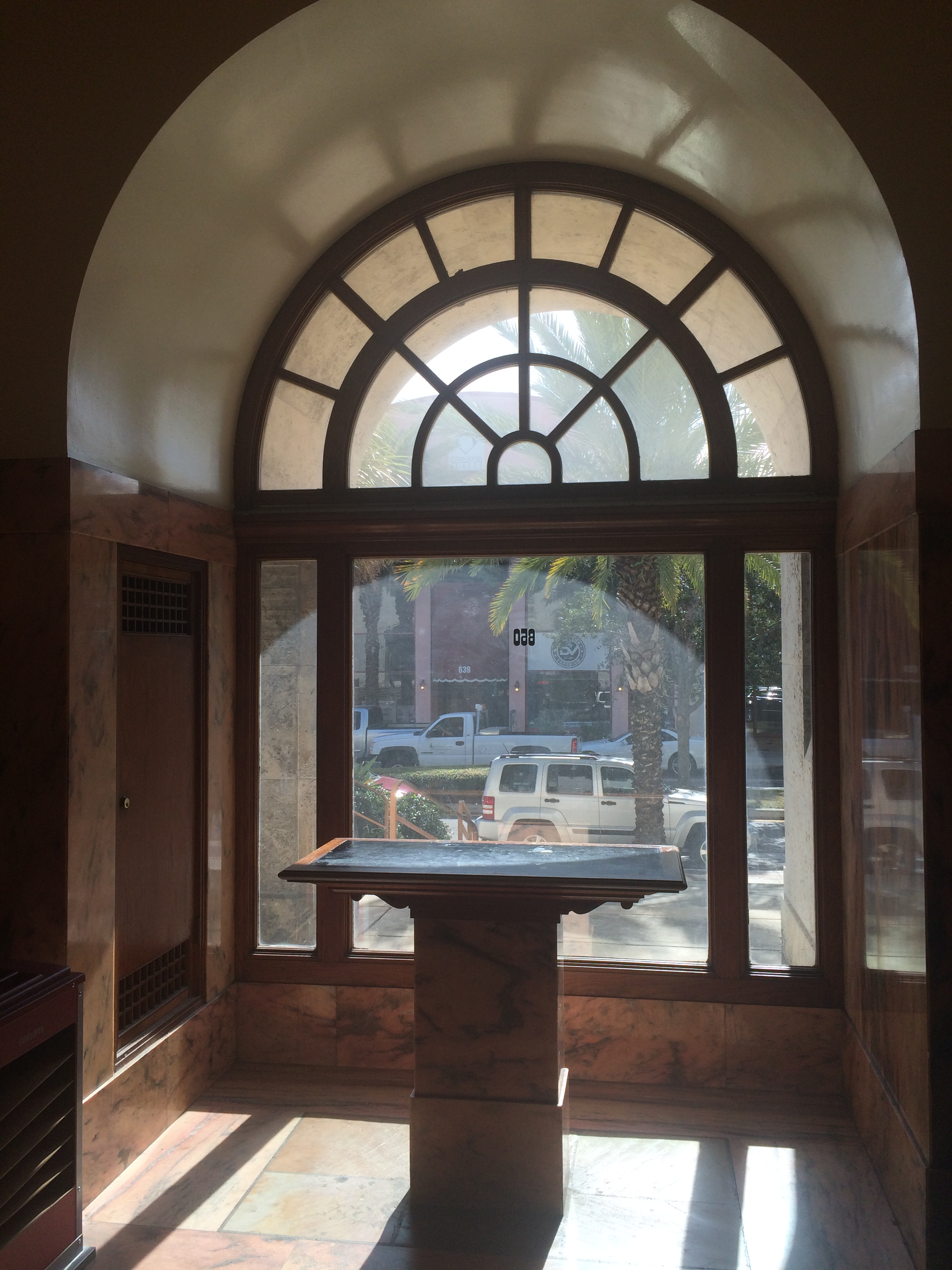
Front window

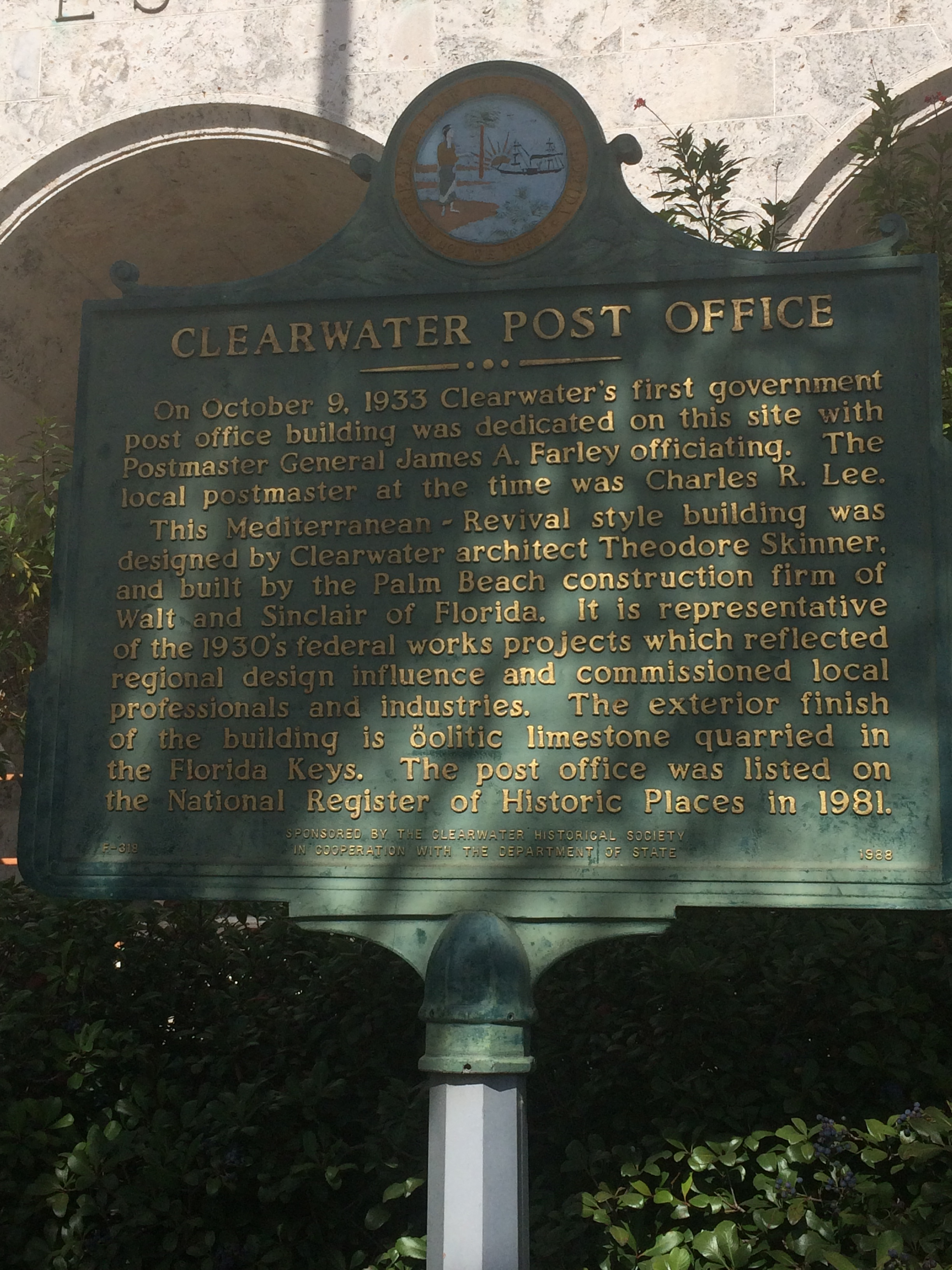
Historic marker

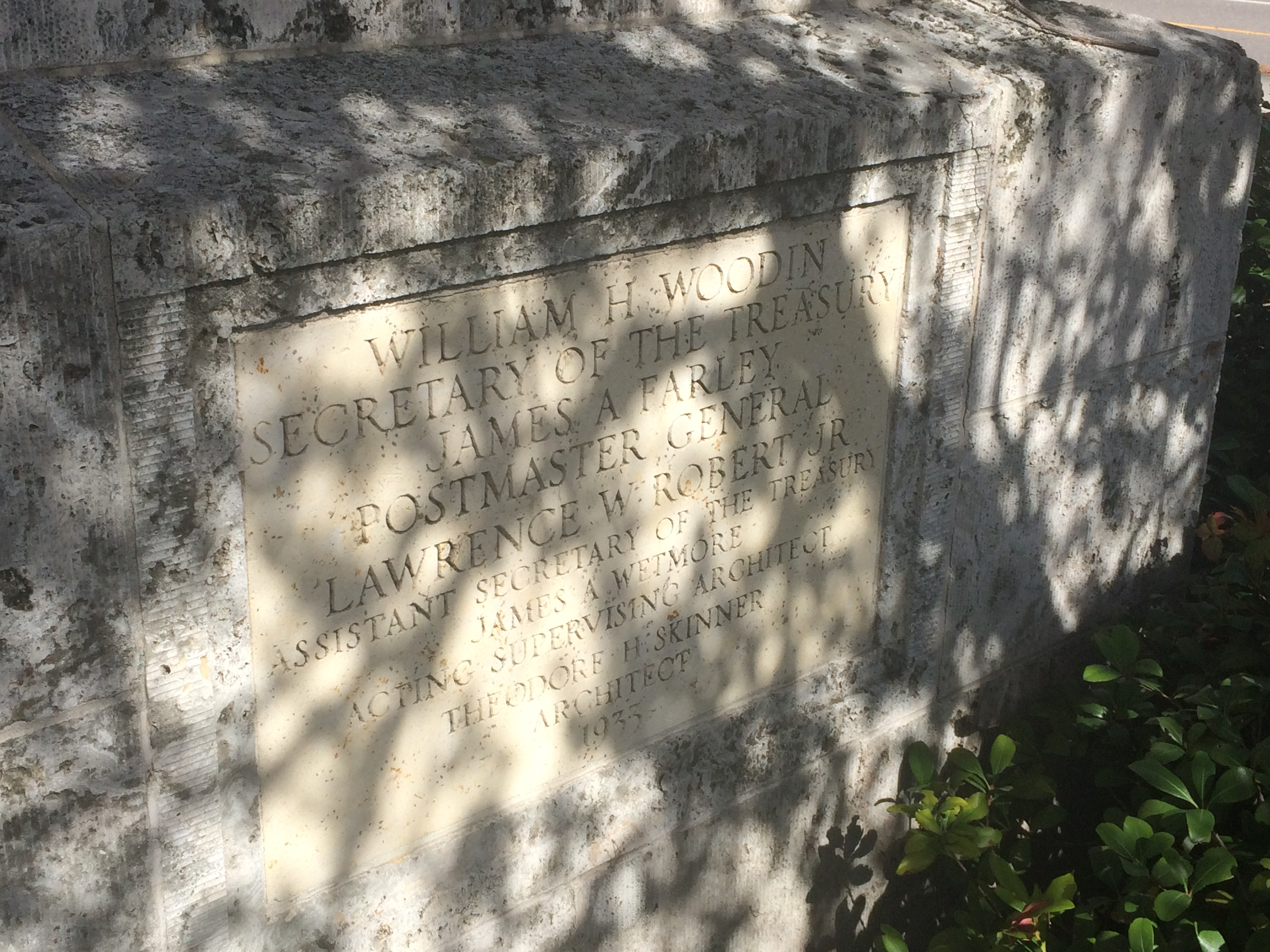
Corner stone

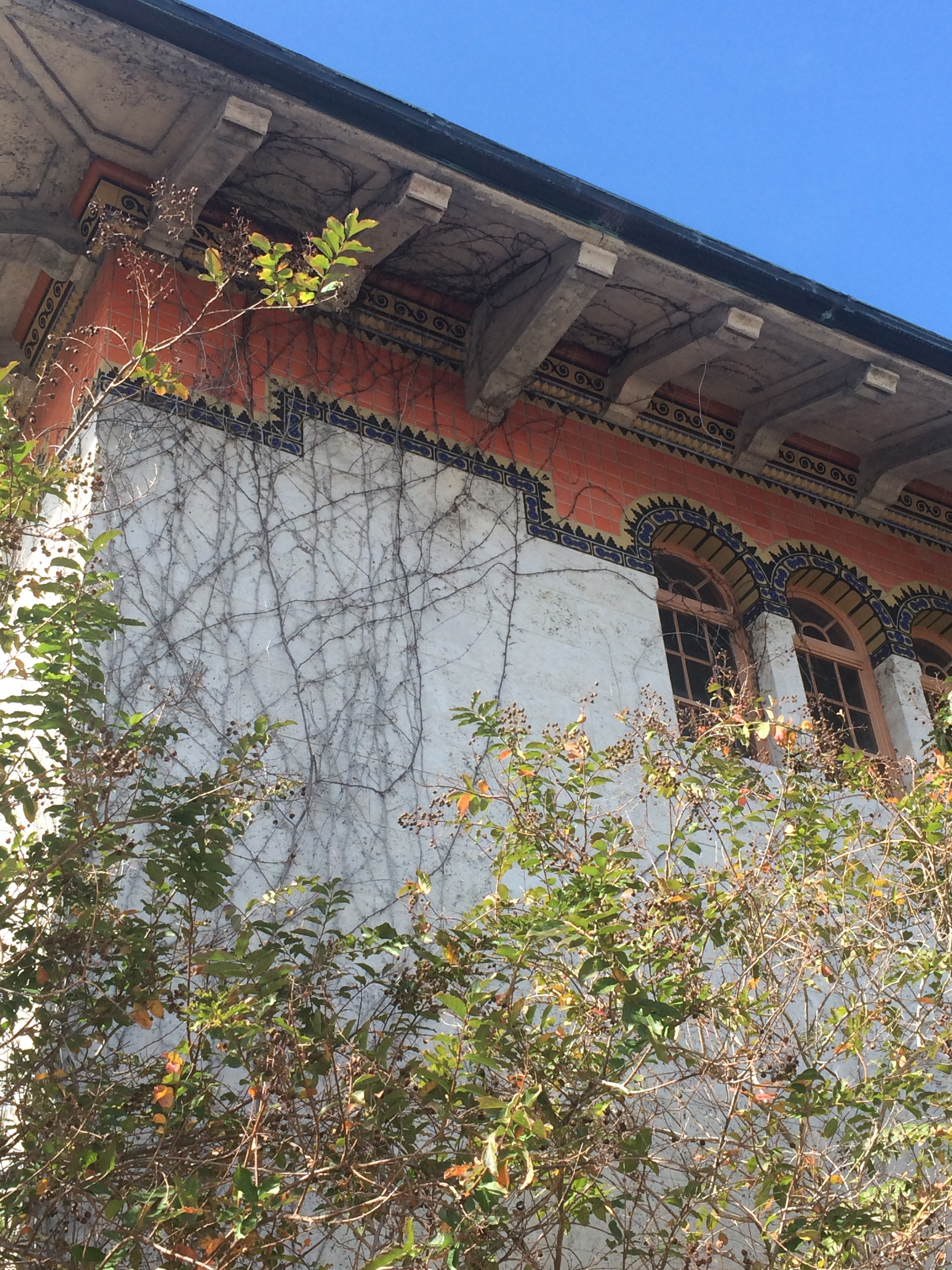
Detail of the eaves and exterior tile

== See also ==
- List of United States post offices
