= Mount Cleveland =

Mount Cleveland may refer to the following places:

== Australia ==
- Mount Cleveland, on Cape Cleveland, Queensland

== USA ==
- Mount Cleveland (Alaska), or Cleveland Volcano, on Chuginadak Island, Alaska
- Mount Cleveland, Skagway, Alaska, near Mount Carmack
- Mount Cleveland (Montana), in Glacier National Park
- Mount Cleveland, near Bethlehem, New Hampshire
- Mount Cleveland (Vermont), in the Green Mountains

== See also ==
- Cleveland Peak, in Colorado
