= Cleveland (given name) =

Cleveland is a masculine given name borne by:

- Cleveland Abbe (1838–1916), American meteorologist and advocate of time zones
- Cleveland Abbott (1894–1955), African-American football player, college football and basketball head coach and educator
- Cleveland Amory (1917–1998), American animal rights activist and author
- Cleveland Bailey (born 1918), Jamaican cricketer
- Cleveland M. Bailey (1886–1965), American politician
- Cleveland Colbert (1906–1962), African-American politician and activist
- Cleveland Eaton (1939–2020), American jazz double bassist, producer, arranger, composer and publisher
- Cleveland Gary (born 1966), American former National Football League running back
- Cleveland Watkiss (born 1959), British singer, actor and composer
- Cleveland Williams (1933–1999), American boxer
