= Charles Cleveland =

Charles Cleveland may refer to:

- Charles Cleveland (basketball) (1951–2012), American college basketball player
- Charles Cleveland (rugby union)
- Charles F. Cleveland (1845–1908), American soldier and Medal of Honor recipient
- Charles G. Cleveland (1927–2021), U.S. Air Force lieutenant general and flying ace
- Charles H. Cleveland, United States Army major general
- Charles T. Cleveland (born 1956), U.S. Army lieutenant general
