= List of sports teams in Cleveland =

The following is a list of sports teams that either are currently or were previously based in Cleveland, Ohio. Teams still active in Cleveland are listed in bold.

== Baseball ==
=== Active ===
- **Cleveland Guardians, Major League Baseball (1901–present)**

=== Defunct ===
- Cleveland Forest Citys, National Association (1871–1872)
- Cleveland Spiders, National League (1879–1884, 1889–1899)
- Cleveland Blues, American Association (1887–1888)
- Cleveland Infants, Players' League (1890)
- Cleveland Green Sox Federal League (1913)
- Cleveland Bearcats, American Association (1914)
- Cleveland Spiders, American Association (1915)
- Cleveland Tate Stars, Negro National League (1922)
- Cleveland Browns, Negro National League (1924)
- Cleveland Elites, Negro National League (1926)
- Cleveland Hornets, Negro National League (1927)
- Cleveland Tigers, Negro National League (1928)
- Cleveland Cubs, Negro National League (1931)
- Cleveland Stars, East-West League (1932)
- Cleveland Giants, Negro National League (1933)
- Cleveland Red Sox, Negro National League (1934)
- Cleveland Bears, Negro American League (1939–1940)
- Cleveland Buckeyes, Negro American League (1943–1948, 1950)

== Basketball ==
=== Men's basketball ===
==== Active ====
- **Cleveland Cavaliers, National Basketball Association (1970–present)**
- **Cleveland Charge, NBA G League (established 2001, moved to Cleveland 2021)**

==== Defunct ====
- Cleveland Rosenblums, American Basketball League (1925–31)
- Cleveland Chase Brassmen, National Basketball League (1943–44)
- Cleveland Allmen Transfers, National Basketball League (1944–46)
- Cleveland Rebels, Basketball Association of America (1946–47)
- Cleveland Pipers, American Basketball League (1961–1962)

=== Women's basketball ===
==== Defunct ====
- Cleveland Rockers, Women's National Basketball Association (1997–2003)

== Collegiate sports ==
=== Active ===
- **Cleveland State Vikings** -- 17 Varsity (7 men's, 9 women's, 1 coed)
  - Cleveland State Vikings men's basketball
  - Cleveland State Vikings women's basketball
  - Cleveland State Vikings men's soccer
- **Case Western Reserve Spartans** -- 19 Varsity (10 men's, 9 women's)
  - Case Western Reserve Spartans football

=== Defunct ===
- Ohio Chiropody (1929–41)

== Football ==
=== Active ===
- **Cleveland Browns, All-America Football Conference (1946–1949) National Football League (1950–1995, 1999–present)**
- **Cleveland Fusion, Women's Football Alliance (2002–present)**

=== Defunct/relocated ===
- Cleveland Tigers (NFL) APFA (1920), originally named as the Tigers in 1916 in the Ohio League; renamed Indians in 1921
- Cleveland Indians (NFL 1931), league-sponsored team that only played on the road
- Cleveland Bulldogs NFL (1924–1925) (1927), named as the Cleveland Indians in 1923
- Cleveland Panthers AFL (1926)
- Cleveland Rams AFL (1936) NFL (1937–1942) (1944–1945) (now known as the Los Angeles Rams)
- Cleveland Thunderbolts AFL (Arena) (1992–1994), relocated from Columbus, Ohio
- Cleveland Crush, Legends Football League (2011–13)
- Cleveland Gladiators, Arena Football League (2008, 2010–2020)

=== Other ===
- In 1996 the players, staff and ownership of the Cleveland Browns relocated to Baltimore as the expansion team Baltimore Ravens, which is considered a distinct franchise by the NFL. This relocation was seen as highly controversial.

== Ice hockey ==
=== Active ===
- **Cleveland Monsters, American Hockey League (2007–present)**

=== Defunct/relocated ===
- Cleveland Indians, International Hockey League (1929–34)
- Cleveland Falcons, IHL & AHL (1934–37)
- Cleveland Barons, American Hockey League relocated to Jacksonville, Florida (1937–73)
- Cleveland Crusaders, World Hockey Association (1972–76)
- Cleveland Barons, NHL (1976–78)
- Cleveland Lumberjacks, IHL (1992–2001)
- Cleveland Barons, American Hockey League relocated to Worcester, Massachusetts(2001–06)
- Cleveland Jr. Barons, NAHL (2005–06)

== Quadball ==
=== Active ===
- **Cleveland Riff, Major League Quadball (2015–Present)**

== Roller Derby ==
=== Active ===
- **Burning River Roller Derby, Women's Flat Track Derby Association (2006–Present)**
- **Cleveland Men's Roller Derby Guardians, Men's Roller Derby Association (2013–Present)**

== Rugby league ==
- **Cleveland Rugby League, North American Rugby League (2021–Present)**

== Rugby union ==
=== Active ===
- **Cleveland Rovers RFC, USA Rugby (1978–present)**
- **Cleveland Women's RFC, Iron Maidens (2003–present)**
- **Cleveland Crusaders RFC, (2015–present)**

== Soccer ==
=== Active ===
- **Cleveland Crunch, Major League Indoor Soccer (1989–present)**
- **Cleveland SC, National Premier Soccer League (2018–present)**

=== Defunct/relocated ===
- Cleveland Stokers, North American Soccer League (1967–68)
- Cleveland Stars, American Soccer League (1972–73) (name change from Cleveland Stars to Cleveland Cobras before 1974 season commenced)
- Cleveland Cobras, American Soccer League (1974–81)
- Cleveland Force, MISL (1978–88)
- Cleveland Force, MISL (2002–2005) (name change from Cleveland Crunch back to Cleveland Force in 2002, when NPSL became the MISL)
- Cleveland City Stars, USL First Division (2006–09)
- Cleveland Internationals, USL PDL (2004–10)
- Cleveland Freeze, Professional Arena Soccer League (2013–2014)
- AFC Cleveland, National Premier Soccer League (2012–2017)

== Softball ==
=== Defunct ===
- Cleveland Jaybirds, American Professional Slow Pitch League (1977–78)
- Cleveland Stepien's Competitors, American Professional Slow Pitch League (1979)
- Cleveland Stepien's Competitors, North American Softball League (1980)
- Cleveland Competitors, United Professional Softball League (1982)

== Indoor professional team tennis ==
=== Defunct ===
- Cleveland Nets (featured Björn Borg & Martina Navratilova), World Team Tennis (1974–77)

== See also ==
- Sports in Cleveland
