= Cleveland (automobile) =

Defunct American motor vehicle manufacturer

Cleveland Motor Car Company
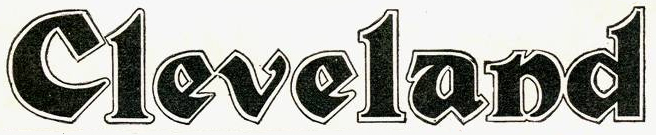
- Company type: Automobile Manufacturing
- Industry: Automotive
- Founded: 1904
- Founder: E. J. Pennington
- Defunct: 1909
- Headquarters: Cleveland, Ohio, United States
- Products: Vehicles; Automotive parts

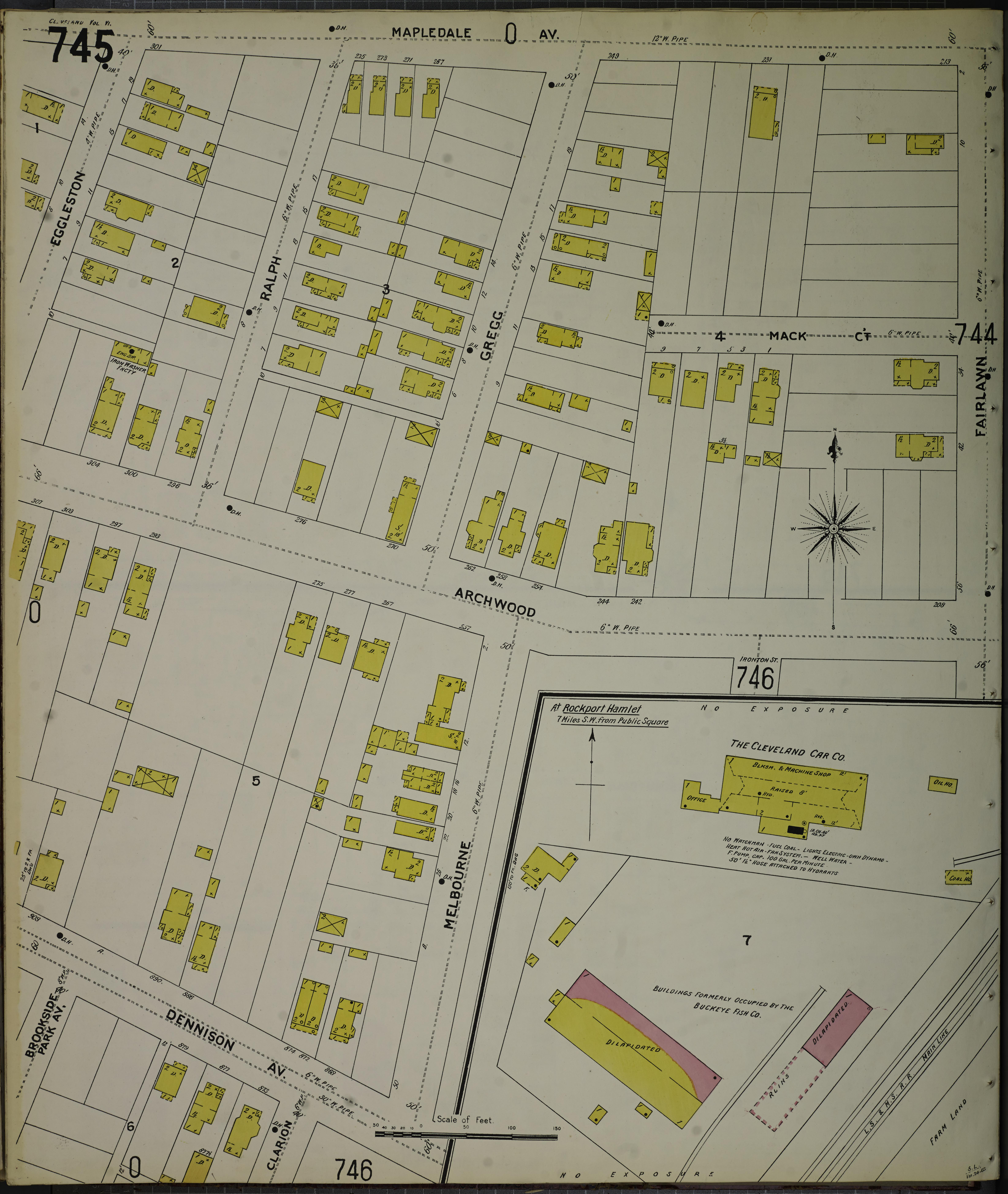
Cleveland Motor Car Company plant 1903

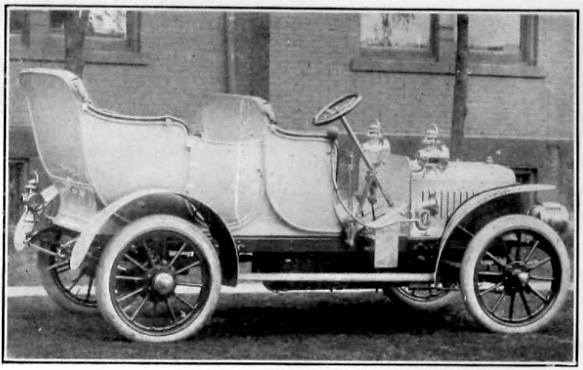
Cleveland 30-35 hp (1905)

The Cleveland Motor Car Company of Cleveland, Ohio, was manufacturer of one of several Cleveland automobiles. The company was founded in 1904 by E. J. Pennington.

== Advertisements ==
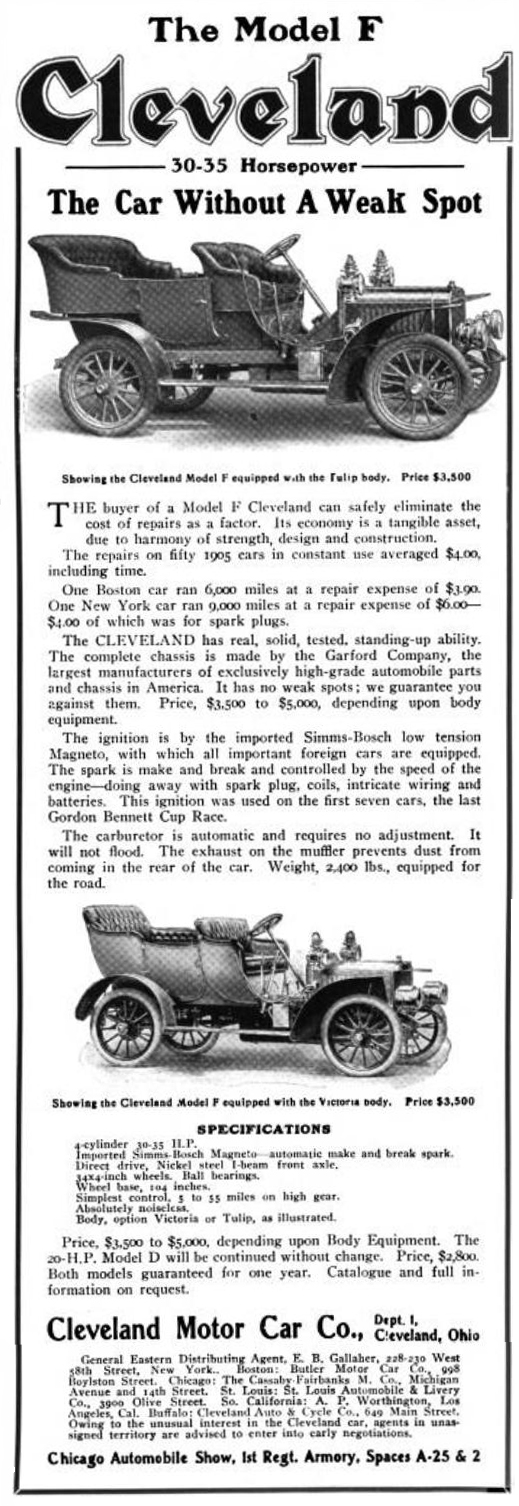
Cleveland Motor Car Company - 1906
