= Cleaveland (whaling family) =

The Cleavelands were a family of whalers from the islands of Martha's Vineyard and Nantucket, Massachusetts, United States, from the seventeenth though the nineteenth centuries. They are related to many of the other whaling families of the islands, including the Mayhew, Athearn, Coffin, Look, Luce, and Pease families.

== Moses Cleaveland ==
The Cleveland families of Martha's Vineyard and Nantucket trace their name to Moses Cleaveland, the first of that name on the islands. He was born September 1, 1651, in Woburn, Massachusetts, and died October 30, 1717, in Southold, New York.

During his life, Moses Cleveland is believed to have been a soldier, mariner, and farmer. He served in the bloody King Philip's War of 1675–1678. In April 1691, when the Martha's Vineyard town of Edgartown formed a company of militia, he was made second sergeant.

In addition to giving rise to the Martha's Vineyard and Nantucket families, Moses Cleaveland was an ancestor of: General Moses Cleaveland, who laid out the initial plan of the city of Cleveland, Ohio, and for whom that city was named; and Grover Cleveland, 22nd and 24th President of the United States.

== Ebenezer Cleaveland ==
Ebenezer Cleaveland, son of the first Ebenezer—the first Cleaveland born on the Islands—was born in Edgartown, Massachusetts, in 1708 and died September 10, 1794, on Nantucket. He was a whaling captain.

== Sylvanus Cleaveland ==
Sylvanus Cleaveland was born on February 25, 1775, in Tisbury, Massachusetts, and died March 27, 1807, at sea. He was a whaling captain.

== Henry Cleaveland ==
Henry Cleaveland was born September 23, 1799, in Tisbury, Massachusetts and died September 8, 1878, in Tisbury.

Henry Cleaveland was captain of the whaler Niantic, one of the earliest of hundreds of ships with passengers to arrive in San Francisco in the California Gold Rush in 1849. Significant artifacts from Niantic can be found in the San Francisco Maritime Museum.

Henry Cleaveland retired from whaling after this voyage.

== James Freeman Cleaveland ==
James Cleaveland, son of Henry Cleaveland, was first mate aboard the whaler Niantic when she arrived in San Francisco.

After sale of Niantic in San Francisco, James Cleaveland bought the smaller brig Mary Wilder. He sailed her out of San Francisco with a tiny crew of mainly Vineyarders at a time when crews of all arriving ships were jumping ship to join the gold rush. With Mary Wilder, they brought lumber from the Columbia River to the booming city of San Francisco, and then goods from China to satisfy the city's demand for luxury goods. He returned to whaling after several China voyages. During the Civil War, he escaped an encounter with the commerce raider CSS Alabama.

After years of whaling, James Cleaveland settled down to farming, and served as selectman for Tisbury. He died in 1907 in West Tisbury, Massachusetts. His home in West Tisbury is known today as The Cleaveland House.
