= Isambard Kingdom Brunel =

English civil and marine engineer (1806–1859)

Isambard Kingdom Brunel FRS MICE
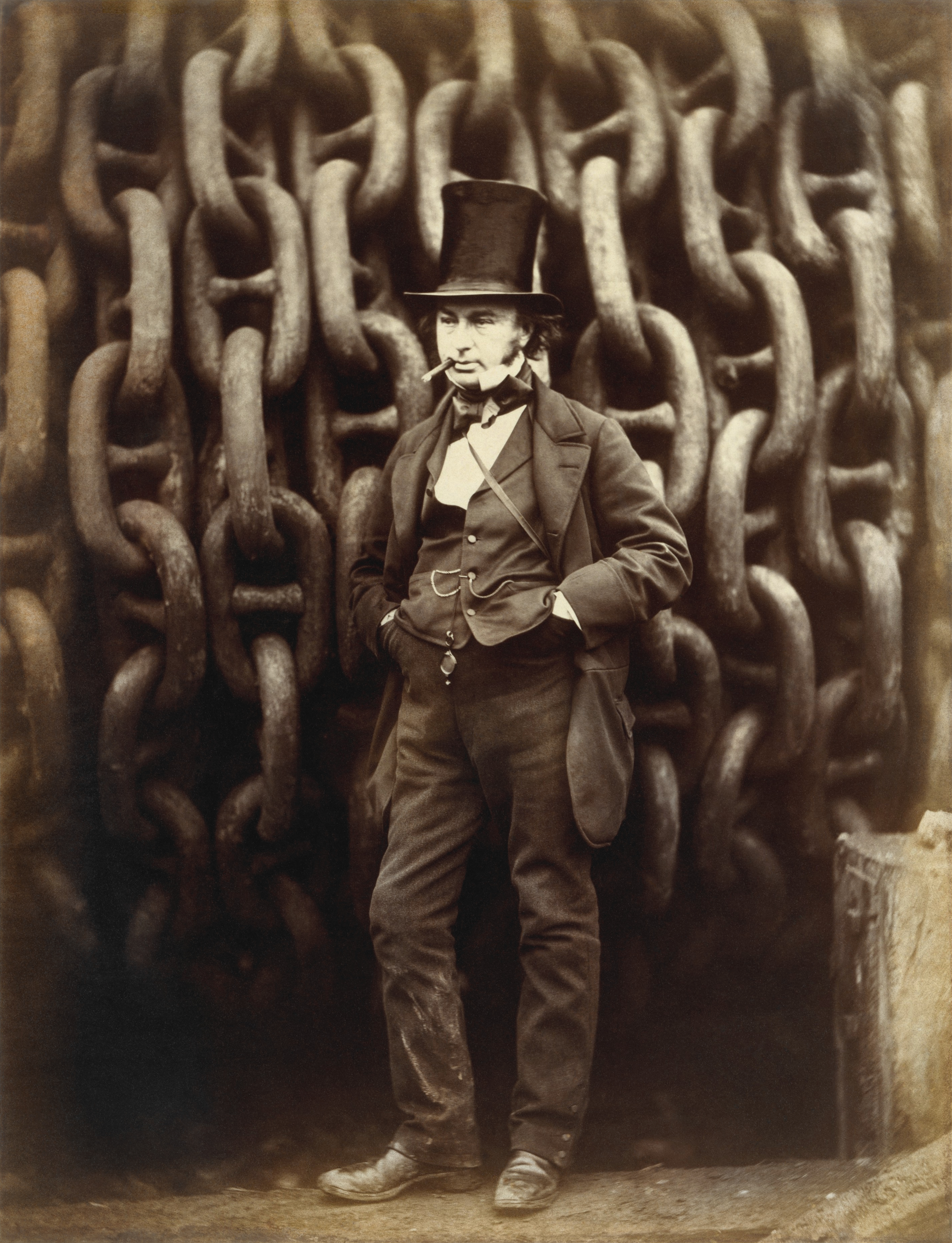
- Brunel by the launching chains of the SS Great Eastern, by Robert Howlett, 1857
- Born: 9 April 1806; Portsea, Portsmouth, Hampshire
- Died: 15 September 1859 (aged 53); Westminster, London, England
- Education: Lycée Henri-IV; University of Caen
- Spouse: Mary Elizabeth Horsley (m. 1836)
- Children: 3, including Henry Marc
- Parents: Marc Isambard Brunel; Sophia Kingdom
- Engineering career
- Discipline: Civil engineer; Structural engineer; Marine engineer
- Projects: Early projects: Thames Tunnel; Clifton Suspension Bridge; Railway projects: Great Western Main Line; Royal Albert Bridge; Shipping projects: SS Great Western; SS Great Britain; SS Great Eastern

Isambard Kingdom Brunel (Note: /ˈɪzəmbɑːrd ˈkɪŋdəm bruːˈnɛl/ IZZ-əm-bard KING-dəm broo-NELL) (9 April 1806 – 15 September 1859) was an English civil and marine engineer considered "one of the greatest figures of the Industrial Revolution", "perhaps the most eminent Victorian engineer", and one whose work "altered the lives of almost every person in Britain, and millions abroad". The first engineer of the Great Western Railway (GWR), he was responsible for the design and construction of its London–Bristol main line. His maritime career saw the construction of the largest steamships in the world at the time, the SS Great Western, SS Great Britain, and SS Great Eastern. His career was marred by continual financial and engineering setbacks.

His first major project, the Thames Tunnel, was cancelled after a collapse nearly killed him, and was only completed later without his involvement. While recovering, he began his work on the Clifton Suspension Bridge; after riots in Bristol around government policy, work on the bridge was cancelled and it was only completed after his death.

Brunel's time at the GWR saw ground-breaking advances in railway design and construction quality, yet was marred by frequent conflict with its board and figures such as Dionysius Lardner. Additionally, his choice to use a broad gauge of 7 ft 1/4 in (2,140 mm) became greatly problematic for the GWR in the long-term, and his attempt to convert parts of the network into an atmospheric railway was unsuccessful. His railway career involved his founding of many of the principles of a successful railway, with his route for the Great Western Main Line minimising curves and gradients. Brunel's construction of the Box Tunnel, the longest in the world at the time, was a success in spite of claims it would be impossible to construct safely. The Royal Albert Bridge was also eventually successful, but the lasting impact of the panic of 1847 meant Brunel had to simplify its design, and it was only completed shortly before his death.

Seeking to expand the GWR westwards toward the Americas, Brunel began looking at the prospect of developing steamships in the mid-1830s, and the three ships he built were each engineering marvels in their own right. The SS Great Western was the second ship to hold the Blue Riband, and her transatlantic crossings were commercially successful. The SS Great Britain was both the first iron-hulled and propeller-driven ship to make a transatlantic crossing, and was successful until her running aground in 1847 bankrupted her parent company. The SS Great Eastern was set back by conflict between Brunel and John Scott Russell and marred by financial and technical problems, with Brunel dying shortly after she suffered a huge explosion on her maiden voyage. She never saw commercial success except as a cable layer.

In 2002, Brunel was placed second in a BBC public poll to determine the "100 Greatest Britons", with a major programme of events celebrating the 200th anniversary of his birth in 2006. Brunel is remembered as an engineering genius and visionary, whose maritime works in particular were too far ahead of their time to see success. His obituary in the Morning Chronicle remarked that "the history of invention records no instance of grand novelties so boldly imagined and so successfully carried out by the same individual".

== Early life ==
=== Family ===
Isambard Kingdom Brunel was born on 9 April 1806 in Britain Street, Portsea, Portsmouth, Hampshire. He was the third child of his parents, and only son; his elder sisters were named Sophia and Emma and born in 1801 and 1804 respectively. At the time of his birth, his father was working on various projects for the Royal Navy in the area, including block-making machinery which employed the world's first production line. He was named Isambard after his father, the French-British civil engineer Sir Marc Isambard Brunel, and Kingdom after the English family of his mother, Sophia Kingdom; both of his parents had links to Normandy, (Note: The actual birthplace of his mother is disputed between Normandy and Portsmouth: Gillings (2006, p. 1) calls her family "English" without further comment; Timbs (1860, p. 309) says she is from Rouen; Brindle (2005, pp. 30–31) says she moved to Rouen to learn French, having lived already in Portsmouth; Rolt (1989, p. 9) says she is from Portsmouth; Jones (2020, p. 12) says she is from Portsmouth and was sent to France; and Bryan (1999, p. 7) says she is from Portsmouth.) where the Brunel name had been recorded since the 1400s. Dr Steven Brindle calls Marc Brunel "the most remarkable and able inventor living in Britain at that date".

Sophia, Brunel's mother, was an orphan for most of her childhood; her father, the naval contractor William Kingdom, died when she was young. Brunel's father, Sir Marc Isambard Brunel, was born in France, but spent much of his childhood in England before returning in 1792. After making a royalist speech denouncing Maximilien Robespierre in January 1793, he was forced into hiding with a royalist family, where he met Sophia; the pair quickly fell in love and were engaged. Leaving for New York in September 1793, Marc spent 5–6 years in the United States finding work; in October 1793, Sophia was imprisoned in a convent for her royalist links and was only released upon Robespierre's fall in August 1794. The couple were reunited on 16 March 1799 and married on 1 November.

Shortly after Brunel's birth, (Note: Gillings (2006, p. 8) says this was 1807 whereas Brindle (2005, p. 37) says this was 1808.) the family moved to 4 Lindsey Row in Chelsea, London, which had been converted from Lindsey House. Marc Brunel devised many business ventures, such as making boots for the British Army in February 1809, which was successful until the government cancelled an order and refused to pay, leaving him with significant losses. Furthermore, the sawmill he had founded burnt down in August 1814, and he was unable to raise funds for its reconstruction.

On 14 May 1821, his father, who had accumulated debts of over £5,000 (equivalent to £475,000 in 2025), was sent to King's Bench Prison, a debtors' prison. Not wanting to abandon her husband, Sophia went with him. After three months went by with no prospect of release, Marc Brunel made public that he was considering working under Alexander I of Russia, which caused Arthur Wellesley, the Duke of Wellington, to warn the Chancellor they could not lose such an engineer. In response, the Chancellor relented and issued Marc the £5,000 to clear his debts, in exchange for his promise to remain in Britain; the couple were released in August 1821. Dr Steven Brindle makes the comparison in this respect between Brunel and Charles Dickens: both were of a similar age; both were from Portsmouth; both had fathers sent to debtor's prisons; and both spent their early adulthood in London.

=== Education ===
In spite of his family's tumultuous finances, Brunel had a happy childhood, with his father acting as his first teacher. His father taught him drawing and observational techniques from the age of four, and Brunel had learned Euclidean geometry by eight. During this time, he learned to speak French fluently and the basic principles of engineering. He was encouraged to draw interesting buildings and identify any faults in their structure, and like his father, he demonstrated an aptitude for mathematics and mechanics.

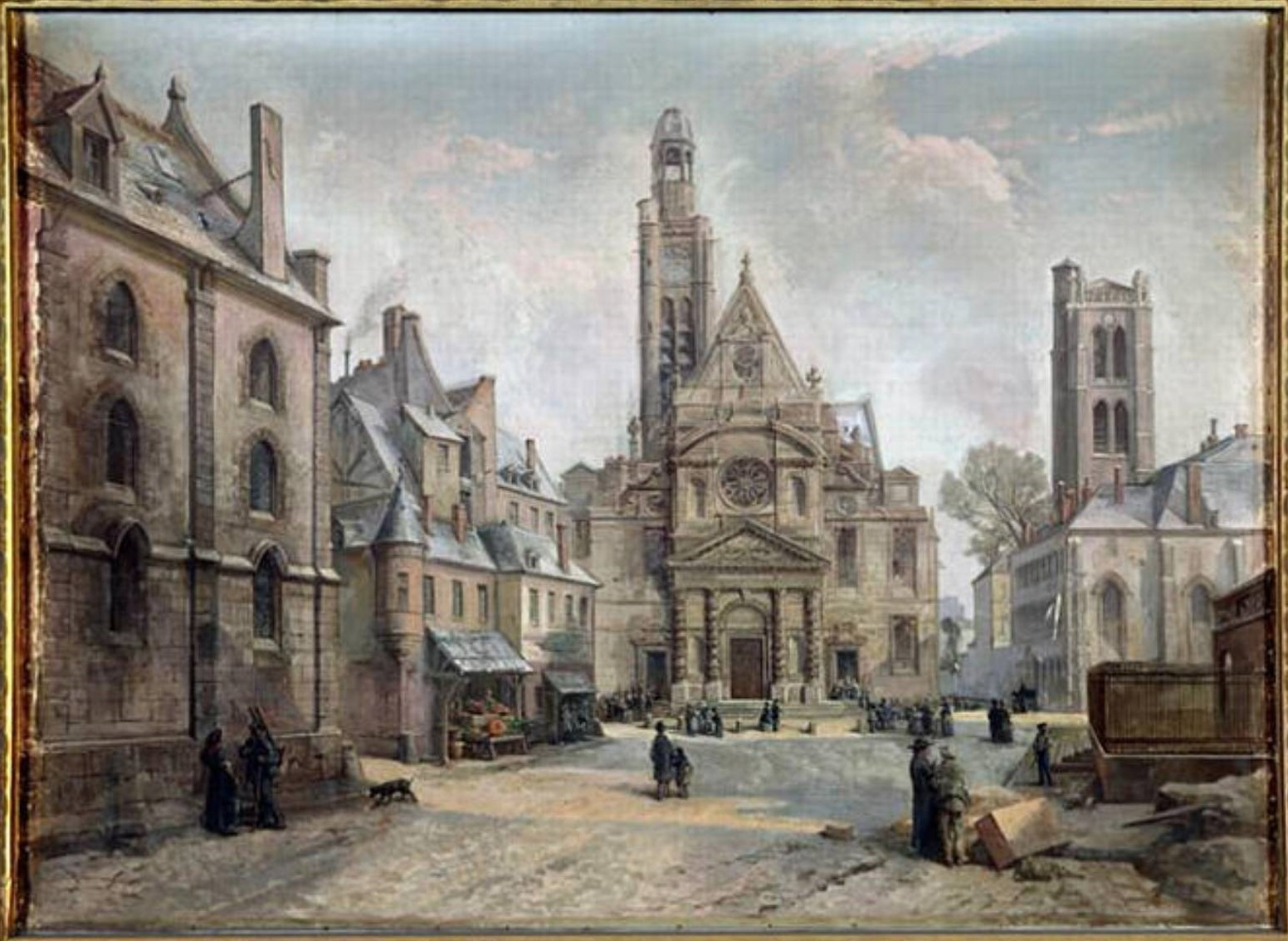
The Lycée Henri-IV in Paris, where Brunel studied

When Brunel was eight, he was sent to a school run by a local Reverend Weeden Butler. He was then sent to Dr Morrell's boarding school in Hove, where he studied classics. His father was determined that Brunel should have access to the high-quality education he had enjoyed in his youth in France. Accordingly, at the age of 14, the younger Brunel was enrolled at the Henri Quatre (Henry IV) College in Caen, where he remained for two years. During his time at the school, he was seen to be interested in helping his father with his work and was very proficient in calculations. Nevertheless, he was also fond of artistic drawings in addition to engineering-based ones. He then went to Lycée Henri-IV in Paris, which was known for its mathematics education. While abroad, he was easily sheltered from his parents' imprisonment, but having been imprisoned for his debts, it is impossible that Marc Brunel could have paid for his son's education; the benefactor who did remains unknown.

When Brunel completed his studies at Lycée Henri-IV in 1822, his father had him presented as a candidate at the renowned engineering school École Polytechnique, but as a foreigner, he was deemed ineligible for entry. At the time, there were no university degrees in the United Kingdom in engineering or mechanics, and so Brunel decided to stay in Paris and study under the prominent master clockmaker and horologist Abraham-Louis Breguet, because horology was the finest type of engineering. Breguet praised Brunel's potential in letters to his father; in August 1822, having completed his apprenticeship, Brunel returned to England.

== Early career ==
=== 1823–1824: First projects ===
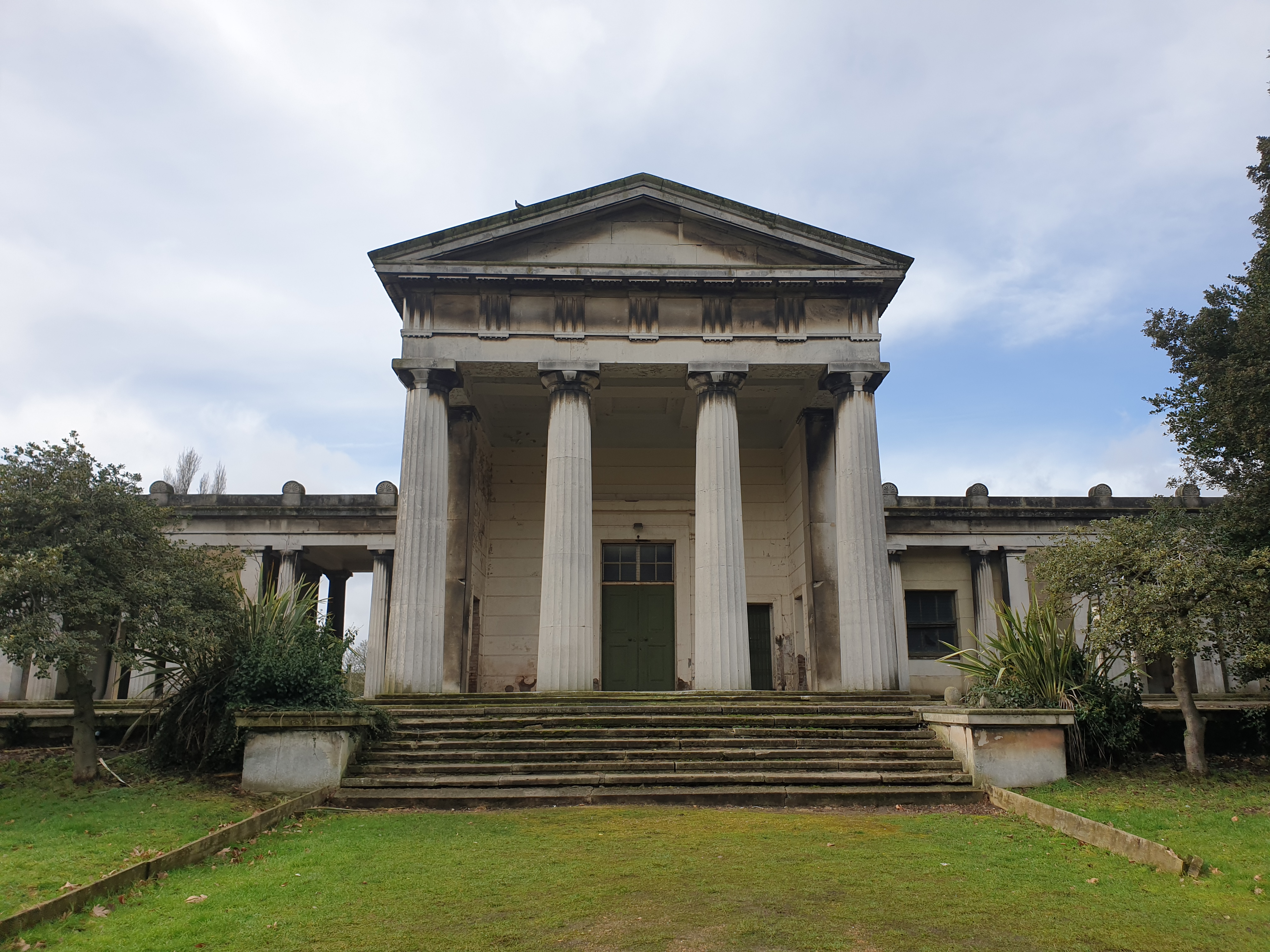
Kensal Green Cemetery, designed by Brunel and his father with Augustus Charles Pugin

Brunel continued his engineering education in England by becoming an assistant to his father from 1823, which allowed him to work on significant engineering projects. During this time, he helped his father with building the bridges on the French island of Réunion (then the Île Bourbon), a design for a potential Panama Canal, the concept of a floating pier for the Port of Liverpool, and working with Augustus Charles Pugin to design Kensal Green Cemetery. While during this time Brunel's career was calm and stable, he also became impatient that he was not yet prominent and successful.

In spring 1823, Brunel's father came up with an idea for a so-called Gaz Engine [sic] which was an alternate design to the steam engine. The idea was based on an experiment by Michael Faraday in which gases such as carbon dioxide could be liquefied under high pressure and, upon being heated, they would boil and massively expand in volume, hence producing the force to drive the engine. The benefit of this in comparison to the steam engine was that there was no smoke released, making it more pleasant to run, and that it would supposedly be significantly more efficient.

Brunel and his father then tried to produce this Gaz Engine at a huge cost, yet Nicolas Léonard Sadi Carnot's work on thermodynamics at around the same time would prove such an engine impossible. (Note: According to the first law of thermodynamics, the energy one puts into the engine to increase the pressure of the gas must be equal to the energy released by its expansion, so even in a perfectly efficient engine no more energy could be created by the process.) However, this work was not yet understood in the United Kingdom, and so Brunel and his father continued to work on it in vain, receiving funding from the Admiralty and Faraday himself. By January 1833, he had finally abandoned his ideas of the Gaz engine, having spent £15,000 on the project, equivalent to £1,410,000 in 2025. He wrote in his diary that "All the time and expense both enormous devoted to this thing for nearly ten years are therefore wasted". (Note: The underlining was done by Brunel in his physical diaries.)

=== 1824–1828: Thames Tunnel ===
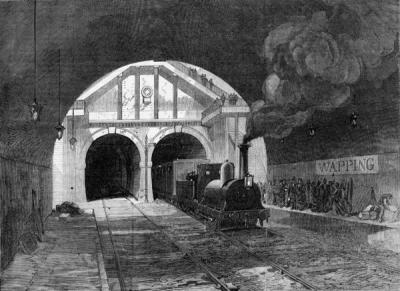
The two bores of the tunnel in 1870 in The Illustrated London News

Brunel's chance to become a prominent engineer arose in July 1824, when his father was appointed as the engineer of a project to build a tunnel under the river Thames. Described by Annabel Gillings as the "most ambitious engineering project of the time", and hailed as an extreme feat in science and engineering, it was designed to alleviate the pressure on London's ferries and on its bridges, of which there were none near the London Docks. The biggest challenge was the softness of the soil below the river: a tunnel between Rotherhithe and Limehouse had been proposed by Robert Vazie in 1802, but after it collapsed inwards twice due to quicksand, the project was abandoned. (Note: An even earlier attempt was made by Ralph Dodd, who in 1798 sank a shaft into the Thames and found its composition was unsuitable for a tunnel, before any hopes were truly ended by a fire.) The composition of the riverbed by Rotherhithe was itself little more than waterlogged sediment and loose gravel.

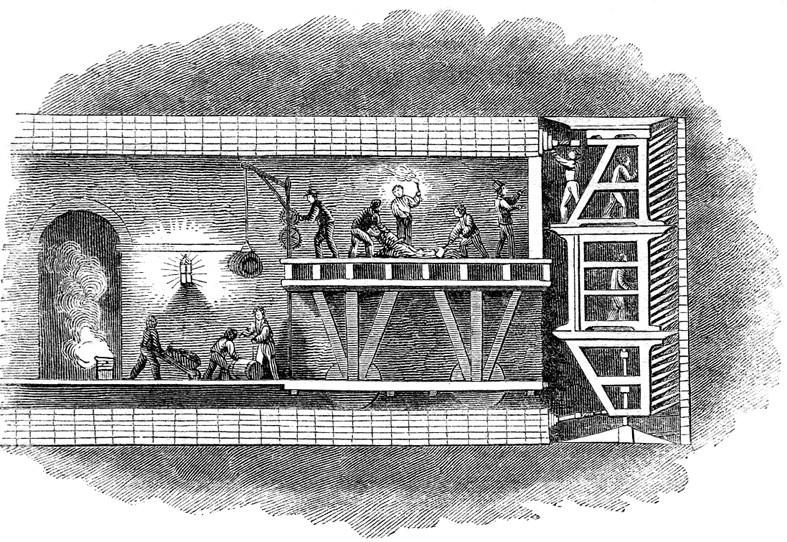
The tunnelling shield used, published in The Illustrated London News in 1870

Marc Brunel's idea for overcoming these challenges came from the shipworm family of molluscs: their hard shell grinds and softens the wood in front of them, which they then eat and, using their faeces to fill in their own path and thus prevent the wood from collapsing. This inspired his tunnelling shield, which he patented on 20 January 1818, wherein twelve workers mined from within a huge cast-iron shield and the spoil was converted to bricks behind them to form the tunnel walls. Only one person would mine at a time, and that person would only uncover, mine, and recover one of their sections at once; the shield was moved forward once this had been done for all thirty-six sections. (Note: Marc Brunel's original patent was for a steam engine to be used with rotating blades to cut the earth within a cylindrical machine, rather like a modern tunnel boring machine, but he realised that the available technology was not good enough to construct this.) On 19 February 1824, one day after Marc Brunel met with the Institution of Civil Engineers, the formation of the Thames Tunnel Company was announced.

The plan for the Thames Tunnel involved digging two separate bores as a dual carriageway, and to construct it very close to the riverbed to avoid the dangerous quicksand beneath. The project ceremonially began on 2 March 1825, and Brunel laid the second brick, after his father. Brunel was given the job of assistant to John Armstrong, the resident engineer of the project, a role Brunel had hoped to have himself. Due to early setbacks, the company pressured for the tunnelling to happen faster, and so the construction became more dangerous. The sewage in the Thames polluted and poisoned the workers below, and yet Brunel and his father helped to work the tunnelling shield.

Banquet in the Thames Tunnel – the event was held on 10 November 1827, a month before the second collapse.

In April 1826, when John Armstrong resigned due to illness, Brunel took over as resident engineer; his father then stepped down from leading the project after contracting pleurisy, with Brunel taking full charge of the engineering from 3 January 1827. At one critical point in September 1826, he refused to leave the tunnel for a total of 96 hours, which he spent working with occasional breaks to sleep. As a token of respect for the toil of the workers and their trying conditions, he moved to a cabin inside the tunnel with one of his assistants, spending his time monitoring the progress and quality of construction and ensuring the workers' discipline.

On many occasions, Brunel risked his life swimming out to rescue workers. After one such incident, he visited the workmen during their dinner and was received with applause, with their wives cutting pieces off of his coat to keep as relics. His most challenging task was dealing with the Thames Tunnel Company, which prioritised the progress of construction over workers' safety; for example, all of Marc Brunel's designs for a drain to protect the tunnel from flooding were rejected due to cost.

By April 1827, the tunnel was so close to the riverbed that discarded items were falling from the river into the tunnel, and the conditions were so polluting that one of Brunel's assistant engineers died and another was left blind in one eye. On 18 May, the river broke through into the tunnel, but luckily no one was killed, as Brunel and his assistants pulled the men out of the water. A team of engineers, including Brunel, dived into the Thames from the surface; they could see the inside of the tunnel from the river. The workers filled in the hole and drained the water, with Brunel commenting unaffected in his diaries:

I wish I had kept this journal with me even at work on the river. What a dream it now appears to me. Going down in the diving bell, finding and examining the hole, standing on the corner of No12! The novelty of the thing, the excitement by the occasional risk attending our subaquatic excursion, the crowds of boats to witness our works... what sensations!

— Brunel's private diary, 13 October 1827

Construction continued on 1 October; on 10 November 1827, a banquet was held in the tunnel with Brunel, his father, and the Duke of Wellington, who would become Prime Minister the next year. By 2 January 1828, water and rocks were already falling into the tunnel from the riverbed. At 6 am on 6 January, Brunel was mining using the shield along with two others when the tunnel collapsed, and Brunel's leg was caught below timber. Six miners were killed, including the two with whom Brunel had been working, but he survived with serious injuries after narrowly being pulled out of the water before he was swept away. After he woke up, he refused to leave until he had assessed the damage to the tunnel, but did not realise how much he was injured; this incident is blamed for his later frailty. He was seriously injured and spent six months recuperating in Brighton, before being sent to live with a friend in Clifton, Bristol, during which time he began a design for the Clifton Suspension Bridge over the nearby Avon Gorge.

Brunel was too ill to continue working on the tunnel and left the project, whose failure left him depressed The second collapse stopped work on the tunnel for several years, and it was bricked up in August 1828 amid ongoing negotiations on its construction. Work would not resume until 1835, and the tunnel was finished in 1843 to a different design. Brunel had no further involvement except using the abandoned works at Rotherhithe as a site for Gaz Engine-related experiments. The tunnel was only usable by pedestrians until the East London Railway Company purchased it in 1865, and four years later the first trains passed through it. Brunel's father was knighted in 1841 for his work on the tunnel, and today it is on the East London line between Rotherhithe and Wapping.

=== 1829–1833: The Clifton Suspension Bridge ===
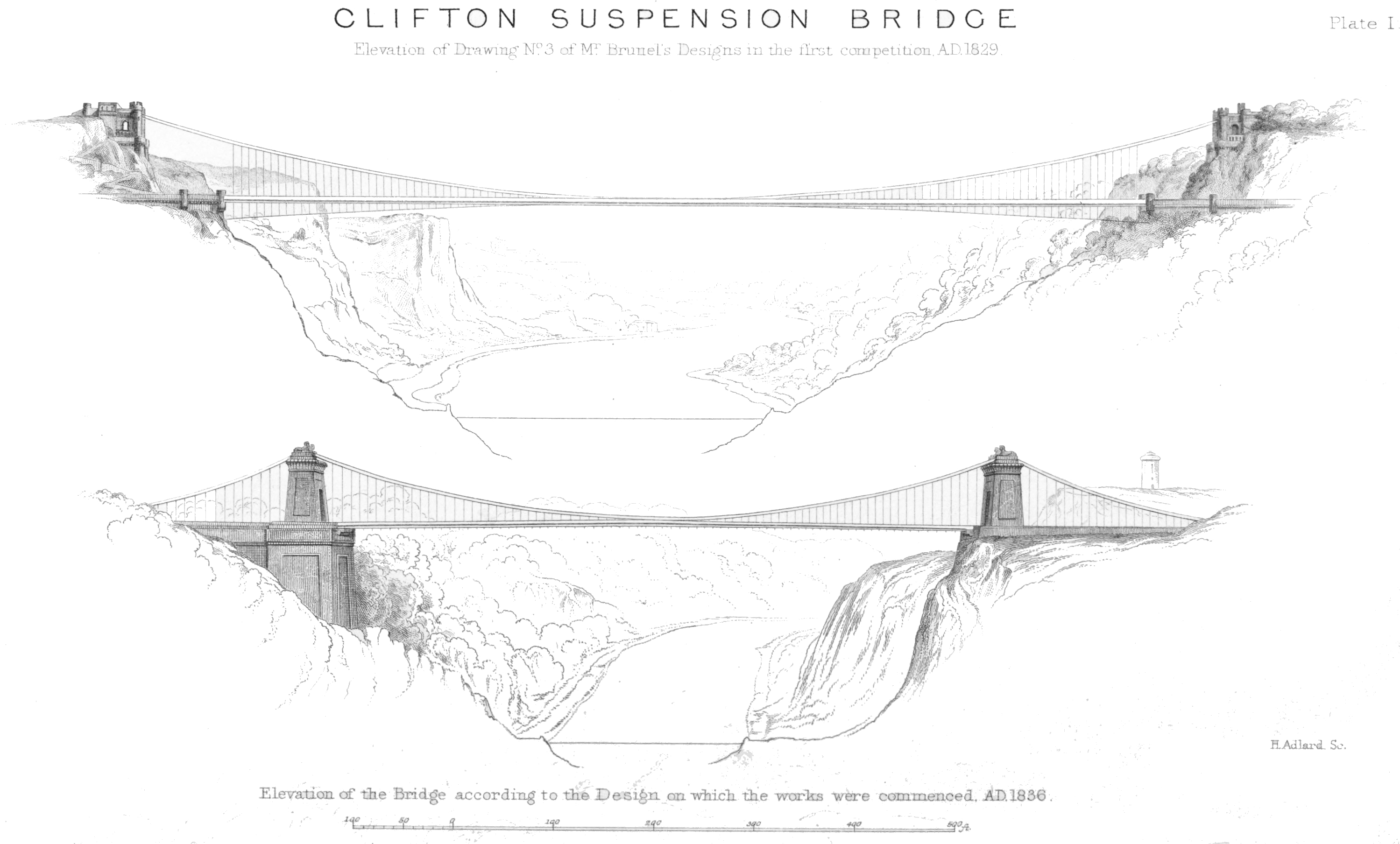
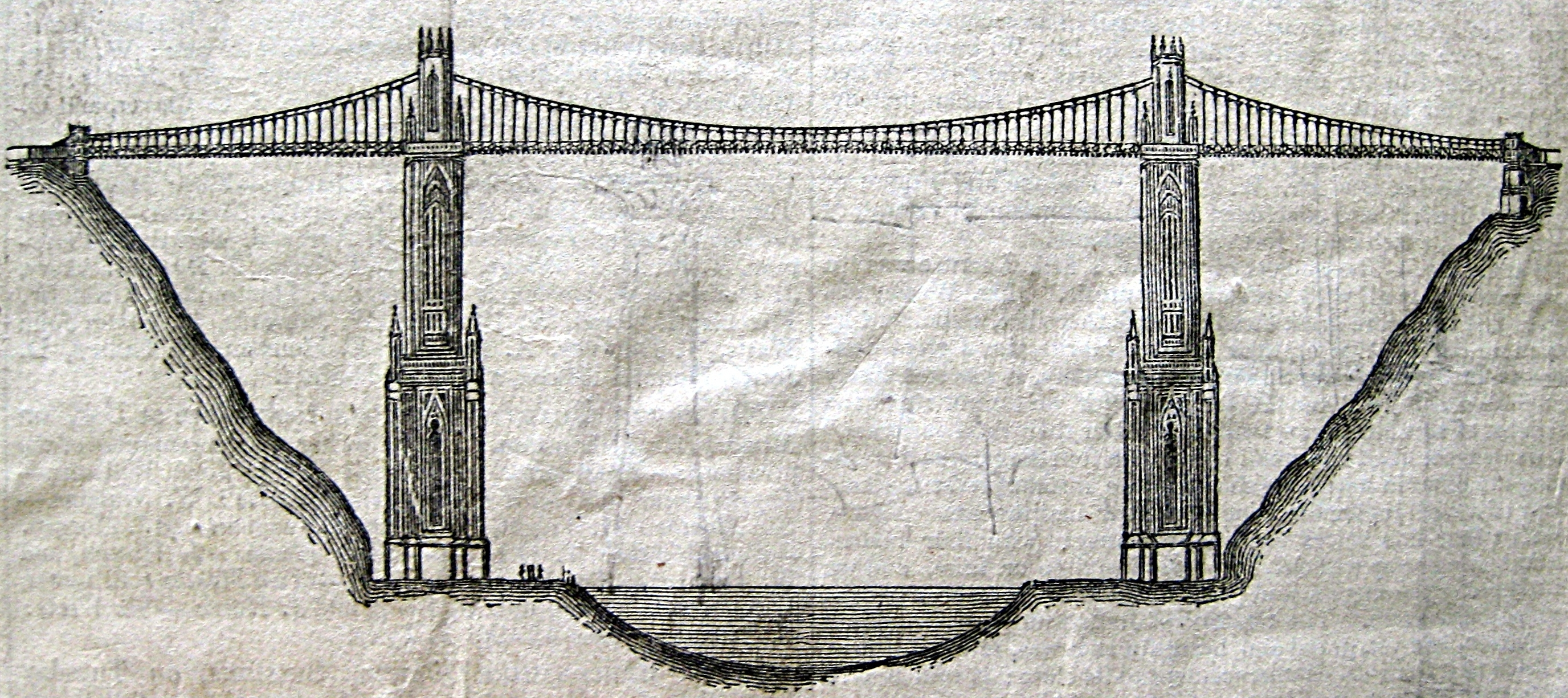
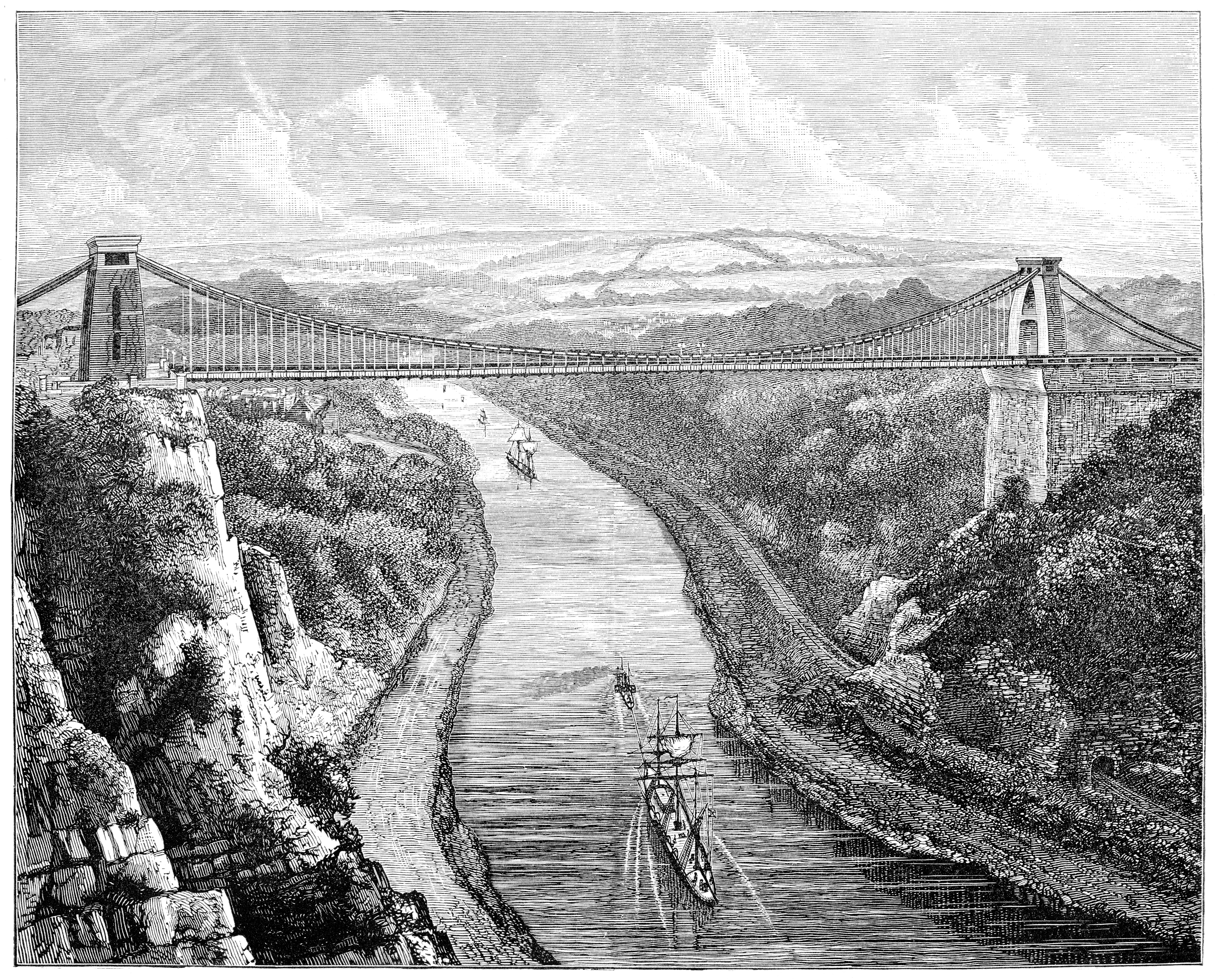
Top: Brunel's design for the first and second competition, showing his structural changes.
Middle: Telford's design for both competitions, showing the intermediate towers.
Bottom: The completed bridge in 1882, to some extent based on Brunel's second design.

Brunel is perhaps best remembered for designs for the Clifton Suspension Bridge in Bristol, whose construction began in 1831. A competition had been announced in 1829 to design a bridge over the Avon Gorge near Bristol; at the time, crossing the gorge involved descending 250 feet (76 m) to the water, getting a ferry across, and reascending the same height, or by dangerously being sent in a basket on a zip line between the two sides. While Brunel had never designed a suspension bridge, his father helped him, and he produced four designs based on different sites for the bridge, with spans ranging from 870 feet (270 m) to the longest ever proposed at the time, at 916 feet (279 m).

Thomas Telford, the then-president of the Institution of Civil Engineers, was invited to judge the entries. The effect of the wind on his own Menai Suspension Bridge made him think Brunel's designs were too long, and he advised against them. Instead, he proposed two intermediate towers at the bottom of the gorge, splitting up the bridge. Brunel argued back that his calculations were correct and that Telford's proposed towers would sink into the ground. By 1830 it became clear that the necessary money for Telford's design could never be raised, and the competition was thus reopened.

Once again, Brunel and Telford both submitted to the second competition, with Telford simply resubmitting the same design. Brunel adapted his design to make it more favourable to the judge, Davies Gilbert, by shortening the span to 630 feet (190 m). Brunel's design was adorned with Egyptian designs, such as sphinxes and hieroglyphs, with large panels detailing the bridge's construction. Both Brunel and Telford lost to W Hawks, with Telford not even selected as a finalist; Brunel travelled to Bristol to confront Gilbert over his decision and persuaded him to change the winner. On 27 March 1831, Brunel wrote to his brother-in-law, the politician Benjamin Hawes:

Of all the wonderful feats I have performed, since I have been in this part of the world, I think yesterday I performed the most wonderful. I produced unanimity among 15 men who were all quarrelling about that most ticklish subject—taste.

— Isambard Kingdom Brunel, in a letter to Benjamin Hawes.

On 21 July 1831, there was an opening ceremony for the construction of the bridge. However, it was quickly plagued by issues; building the approach on one side became challenging, and there was not enough money to complete the bridge. On 22 September 1831, the Reform Act passed the House of Commons, the lower elected chamber of Parliament. The bill promised radical parliamentary reform in the United Kingdom, and the House of Lords, the upper chamber whose interests the bill served against, blocked it. This led to riots that spread across the entire country, but those in Bristol were the heaviest. Brunel himself was sworn in as a "Special Constable" to help control the riots, and he hurriedly took items from Mansion House to stop them from being looted. The riots resulted in the construction of the bridge being cancelled entirely.

Brunel did not live to see the bridge finished. After his death, his colleagues and admirers at the Institution of Civil Engineers felt its completion would make a fitting memorial, and started to raise new funds. Work recommenced in 1862, three years after Brunel's death, and was completed in 1864. With a span of over 702 ft (214 m) and a nominal height of 249 ft (76 m) above the River Avon, it had the longest span of any bridge in the world at the time of construction. Brunel's biographers disagree on to what extent the final bridge reflects his winning entry. In 2011, Adrian Vaughan suggested that Brunel's final contribution was minimal; his views reflected the sentiment of Tom Rolt fifty-two years earlier in his 1959 book Brunel, and Annabel Gillings suggests that "only a fraction of [Brunel's] design is visible", and points out that his decorations were never added. However, Robert Harrison describes the bridge as "nearly in accordance with his original designs". (Note: Indeed, Brunel's own family were offended by the new design for the bridge that was displayed at the 1862 International Exhibition, arguing his contribution had been underplayed.) The bridge still stands, and as of 2007, over 4 million vehicles traverse it every year.

While also working on the Clifton Suspension Bridge, Brunel also took on building the observatory of the astronomer Sir James South at his home in Kensington. On 20 May 1831, the completed observatory was opened with Brunel as a guest of honour. However, a dispute over the cost of the project escalated, and South both refused to pay and published a deeply hurtful article in The Athenaeum that called the observatory an "absurd project" and said of Brunel that it "was an effort to produce effect on the part of the architect"; Brunel considered legal action or appealing for its removal but in the end did neither. Other projects during this time included work in Bristol, where he was made engineer for their docks, and Sunderland, where he was tasked with the export of coal from the growing number of collieries, and where he designed the Monkwearmouth Docks in 1831. On 5 December 1831, he took a ride on the Liverpool and Manchester Railway (LMR); offended by its speed and constant shaking, he tried to write in his diary while the train was moving, daring them to "let me try".

== Railway career ==
=== 1833–1835: Beginnings of the Great Western Railway ===
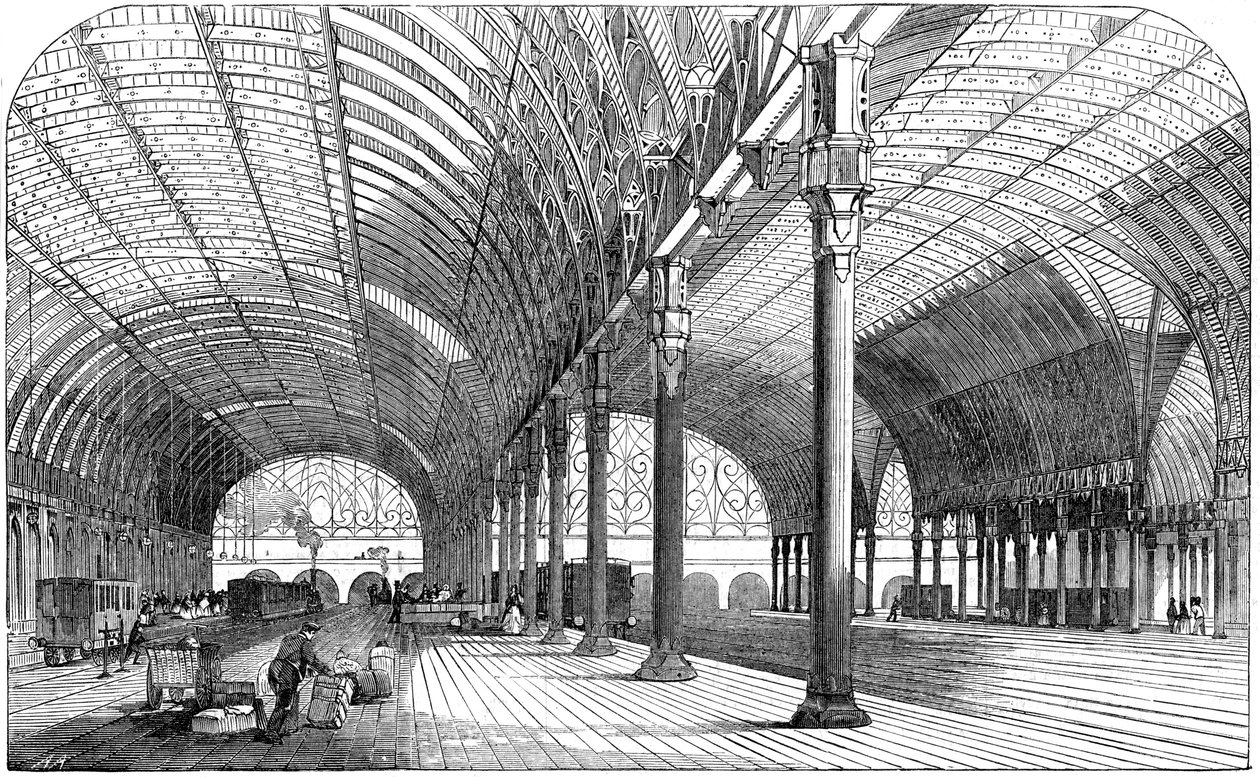
Paddington station as published in The Illustrated London News in 1854

In Autumn 1832, the first plan for a line between London and Bristol was conceived by four men in the latter city. The idea followed from the success of the LMR and the planned London and Birmingham Railway (L&BR), and picked up the support of local groups such as the Society of Merchant Venturers. While the Clifton Suspension Bridge remained incomplete during Brunel's lifetime, it had given him the opportunity to become known by the people of Bristol. When, therefore, a company was formed to build a railway to London, Brunel was floated as a possible engineer. After it was suggested that the role of Engineer would go to the person who designed the line of lowest cost, Brunel wrote to say "You are simply giving a premium to the man who makes the most flattering promises. The route I will survey will not be the cheapest – but it will be the best".

The coat of arms of the GWR, based on its connection between London (left) and Bristol (right)

While the company did appoint Brunel as engineer in March 1833, they had him share the role with William Townsend, whose only experience was on Bristol tramways, and with whom Brunel had no interest in working. Brunel and Townsend were given ten weeks to travel the route on horseback, taking measurements and convincing landowners to sell to the company. many of whom were starkly opposed to the railway. The railway was publicised on 30 July 1833 at 116 miles (187 km), the longest ever proposed at that time. Brunel felt only one of the directors, Charles Saunders, was enthusiastic enough, and the pair became friends. The directors agreed that Brunel would be the line's engineer and confirmed the name—the Great Western Railway (GWR). He hired a team of assistants and made a mobile office out of a Britzka which contained a bed and his equipment; it soon became known as the "Flying Hearse".

On 7 September 1833, the company commissioned Brunel to complete a second, more detailed survey, and finalise the purchase of necessary land. The cost of Brunel's route was £3,000,000 (equivalent to £309,000,000 in 2025), half of which had to be raised to propose the bill in Parliament. Brunel chose to route the railway north of the Marlborough Downs, which he chose for its preferential landscape and potential connections to Oxford and Gloucester, but it faced criticism for avoiding major towns. Once it became clear the necessary funds could not be raised within the parliament, the GWR decided to only propose the London–Reading and Bath–Bristol sections, postponing the rest of the line. The bill was submitted to Parliament in November 1833, and Brunel was called as a witness for eleven of the forty-two days of discussion. According to his biographer Annabel Gillings, he "flourished" under the pressure, making the hearing "a show [of which] he was the star". Nevertheless, the extent of opposition from landowners, settlements, and rival railway companies made the bill nonviable, and the House of Lords struck it down on 25 July 1834.

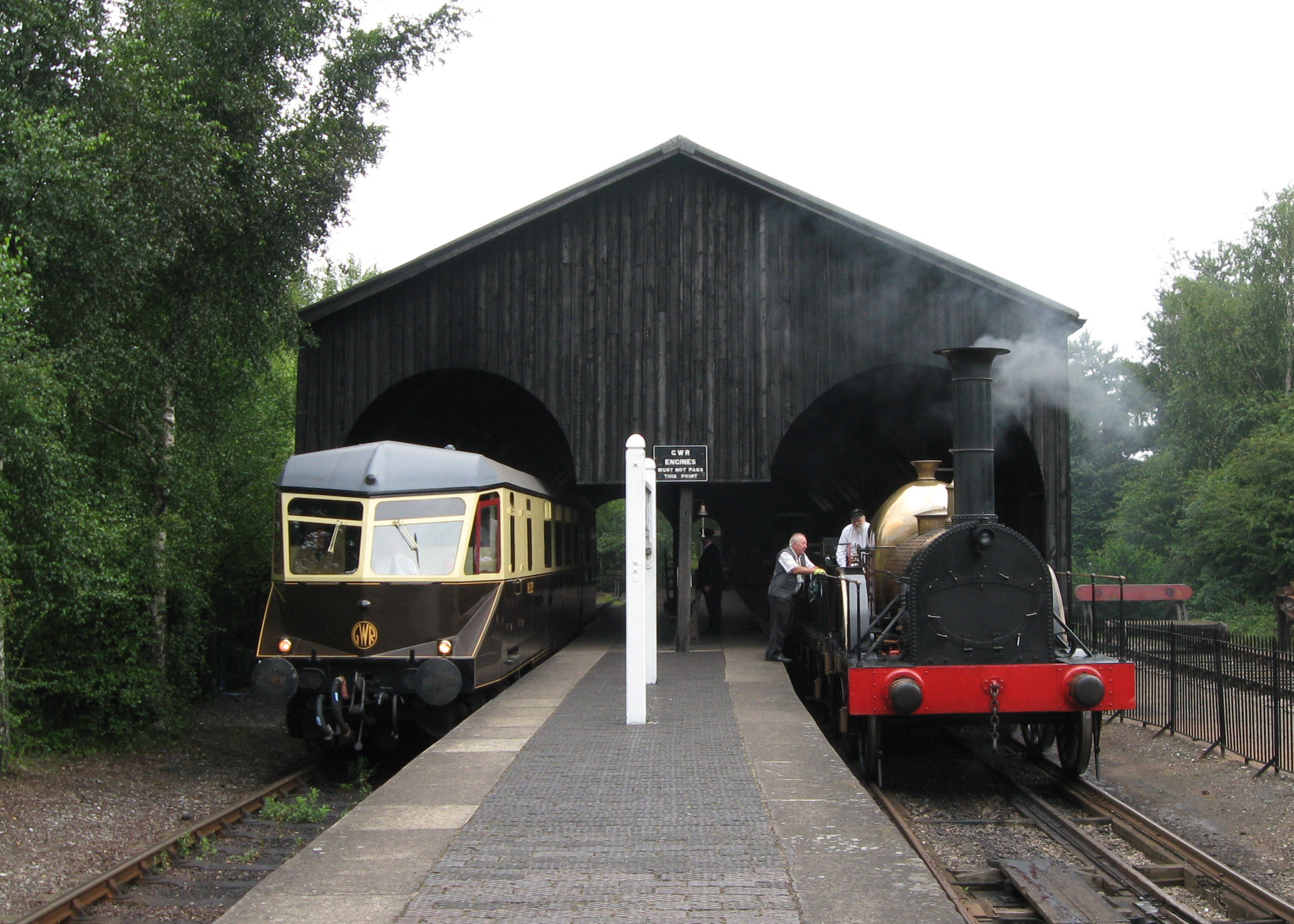
Left: A standard-gauge train on standard-gauge track Right: A broad-gauge train on dual-gauge track, with three rails to allow trains to use either gauge.

The main change made by Brunel to the bill was the terminus, from Vauxhall to meeting the L&BR at Queen's Park and using their terminus at Euston. It was while revising the bill that Brunel realised he could fix the swaying carriages on the Stockton and Darlington Railway by using a wider gauge of at least 6 feet 7 inches (2.01 m), and had any stipulation of gauge removed from the bill without telling the directors. Brunel's decision to use a wider gauge was controversial; his chosen broad gauge was 7 ft 1/4 in (2,140 mm), which he believed would offer superior running at high speeds. He found that the broader gauge was better for speed and comfort, but was less economical than narrower-gauge railways. Almost all other British railways to date had used a gauge of 4 ft 8 1/2 in (1,435 mm), yet Brunel said that this was nothing more than a carry-over from the mine railways that George Stephenson had worked on prior to his creation of the passenger railway. Brunel also argued that the wider gauge allowed for larger goods wagons and thus greater freight capacity.

The revised bill was particularly attacked by the London and Southampton Railway (L&SR), who wanted to protect their own plans for a railway between London and the West. Brunel's plans for the Box Tunnel in particular were very ambitious, and thus easily attackable, and so the L&SR claimed, with the support of Dionysius Lardner, that if a train ran away on the 1 in 100 (10‰) gradient, it would go so fast (120 miles per hour, 190 km/h) that the inhabitants would be unable to breathe. Upon Brunel's dismantling of these claims, the bill finally passed, and was given royal assent on 31 August 1835. It was only on 15 September that year that he revealed the change of gauge to the directors, whose approval was given on 29 October. In December 1835, the company decided to abandon sharing with the L&BR due to disputes between the companies, preferring to build their own station in Paddington, then merely a village on the outskirts of London. By the time the bill had passed, Brunel had already begun engineering works on other local lines such as the Bristol and Exeter Railway and the Bristol and Gloucester Railway.

=== 1836–1841: Construction of the main line ===
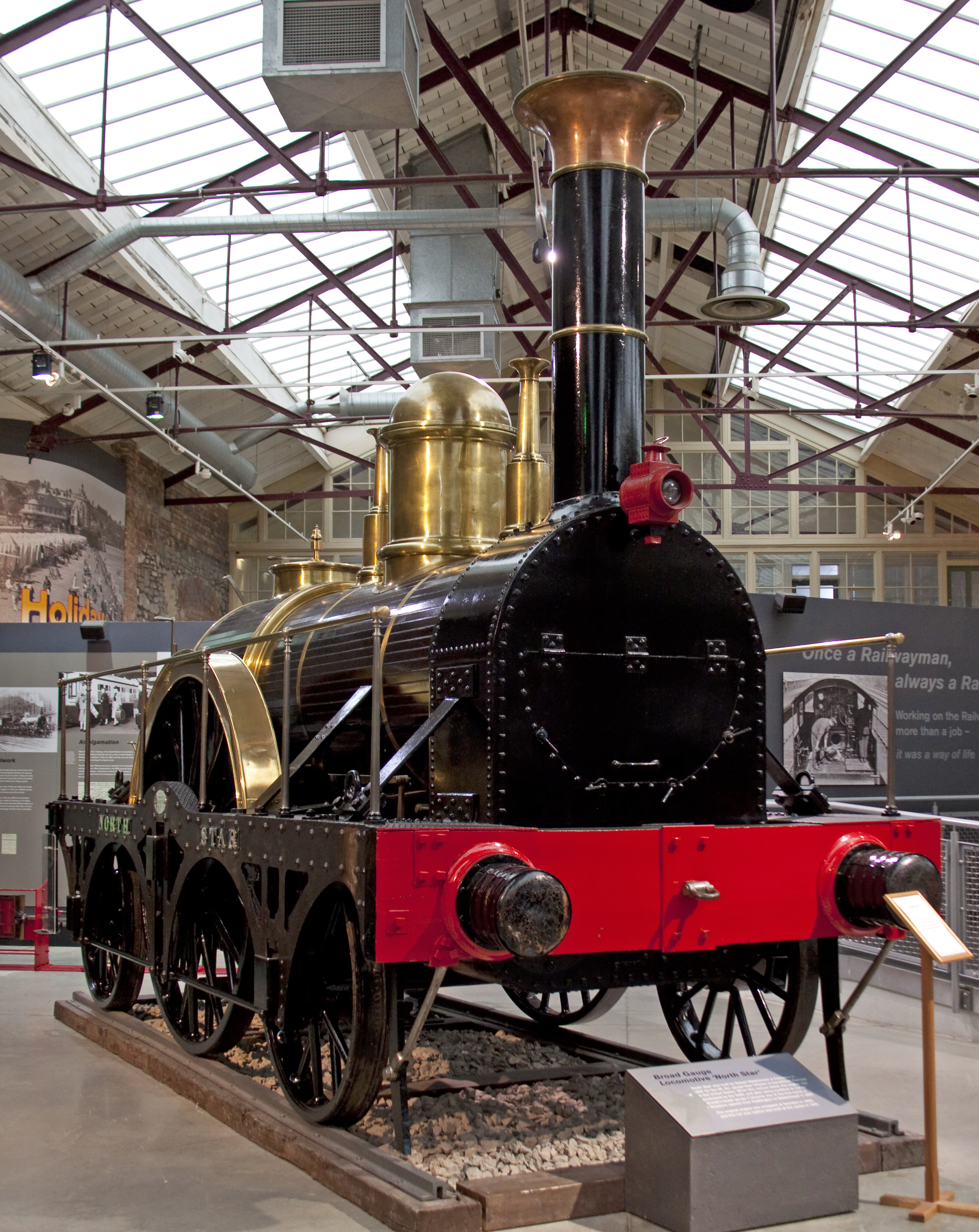
A replica of North Star at the Museum of the Great Western Railway in Swindon, created using some original parts

By the end of 1837, the pressure of building the railway was beginning to affect Brunel. The GWR had made public in August 1837 their plans to open the line by November, which did not materialise. Brunel believed the next deadline set of 30 May 1838 to be impossible as well, but he was in fact wrong, and a private ceremony of the directors and others was held on 31 May 1838, in which the first train, the North Star, ran on the line between Paddington and Maidenhead. However, upon the genuine opening of the section of line on 4 June, problems quickly arose: the locomotives were not of good quality; Brunel's track design was uncomfortable; and the rails quickly shifted under the weight of trains because of Brunel's use of sand instead of stone for ballast. The directors concluded that the broad gauge was actually no worse than standard gauge railways of the time, but was not better as Brunel had promised.

If ever I go mad, I shall have the ghost of the opening of the railway walking before me, or rather standing in front of me, holding out its hand, and when it steps forward, a little swarm of devils in the shape of leaky pickle-tanks, uncut timber, half-finished station houses, sinking embankments, broken screws, absent guard plates, unfinished drawings and sketches, will, quietly and quite as a matter of course and as if I ought to have expected it, lift up my ghost and put him a little further off than before.

— Brunel's description of his deteriorating health and hopes for the main line in a letter to George Sanders, 3 December 1837

Under pressure from the GWR board to work out how to improve the track, a report was given by John Hawkshaw, whose poor research led him to believe the problem was that the locomotives were too powerful for the track. A second report by Nicholas Wood, with the help of Dionysius Lardner, concluded the issue was the number of piles and that broad-gauge trains led to too much drag. The GWR, in response to the reports, decided Brunel needed to work alongside another engineer to prevent further shortfalls; Brunel said he would rather resign, and would prove his worth by completing the line. Firstly, Brunel modified the design of the North Star to improve its speed, after which it could go 38 miles per hour (61 km/h), which was physically faster than Lardner's calculation for Wood's report would allow, and Brunel was kept, alone, as Engineer by a vote of the shareholders, along with his choice of gauge. Brunel believed that the expansion of the GWR would cause other lines to conform to what he saw as the superior gauge.

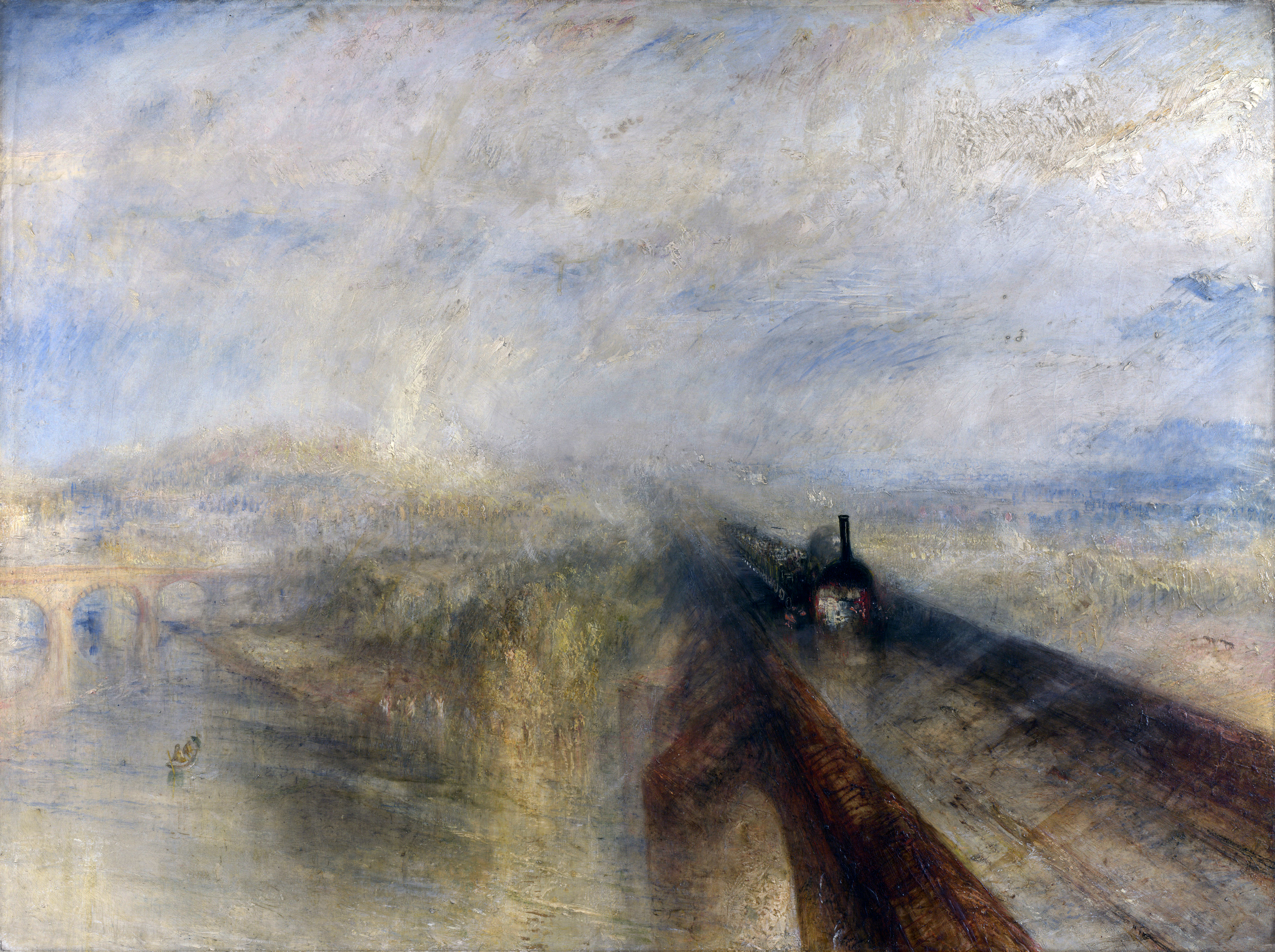
Rain, Steam and Speed – The Great Western Railway, an 1844 oil painting of the Maidenhead Railway Bridge by J. M. W. Turner

One of the most notable structures on the line was the Maidenhead Railway Bridge, the flattest-arched bridge ever built at the time of its completion, a record Brunel insisted on to keep the continuous 1 in 1320 (0.8‰) gradient. The design of the bridge was deemed impossible by some, and after the supports were withdrawn prematurely by the bridge's builders, it began to sag. After it had been repaired, Brunel left the supports in situ, but not actually holding the bridge, to allow his critics to revel in his supposed failure. These supports were then destroyed by storm, revealing the functional bridge behind, which Dr Steven Brindle described as a "heroic affair". The bridge is still functional today despite trains being up to ten times heavier.

Brunel's Western terminus at Bristol Temple Meads was also an innovative element of the line, which began the practice of the railway station as an integrated multi-purpose hub, rather than simply an infrastructural necessity. His design featured a grand neo-Tudor façade to hide the trainshed from the pretty architecture of central Bristol, and his 220-foot (67 m) single-span roof was based on Westminster Hall. During this time, Brunel was constantly battling the GWR board, who thought his plans overambitious and unnecessary. After the board saw his design for Reading railway station in April 1839, they refused to approve it because of its scale, and Bristol Temple Meads was rationalised too later that year. In 1845, Brunel built a new station at a right angle to his first for the Bristol and Exeter Railway. In 1878, the GWR and the Midland Railway built a joint station, the modern Temple Meads, situated on the curve built to connect the GWR to the second station. Brunel's station was taken out of use in 1966.

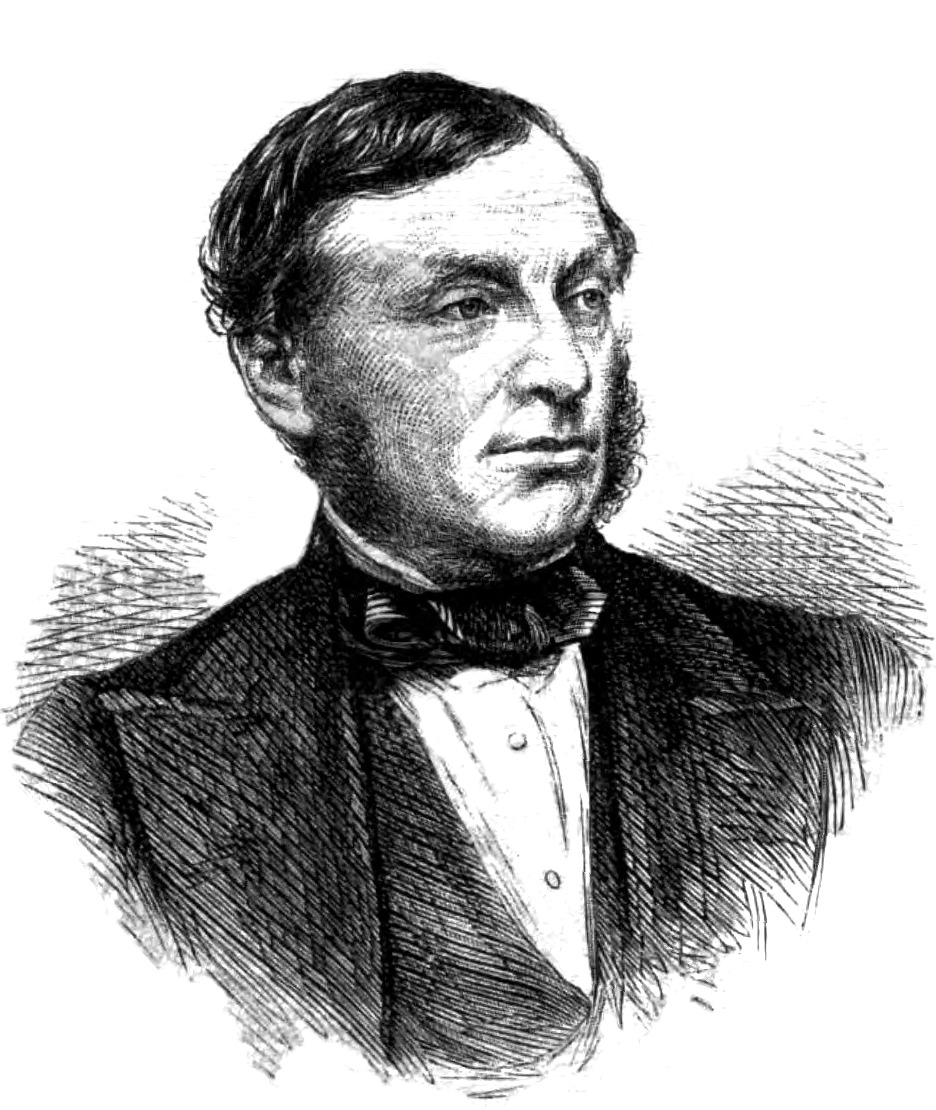
Daniel Gooch was given free rein by Brunel to work on improving the GWR's locomotives, and came up with the idea of works at Swindon.

During this period, Brunel let his assistant Daniel Gooch work independently of him and the board on increasing the capability of the locomotives from their original designs. Robin Jones praises Brunel's ability to see a young Gooch's potential, calling him "spot on when he picked [Gooch] as his sidekick". in 1840, a driver was fined by the company for racing locomotives, and while Brunel at first said the practice "must be put to a stop immediately", he soon changed his mind and refunded the driver. On 13 September 1840, Gooch wrote to Brunel suggesting they build a locomotive works at Swindon as they were running out of space at Paddington station. Rather than just building a works, Brunel built an entire new town for its workers named "New Swindon", which opened with the works on 2 January 1843. Its first locomotive, Great Western, left the works for service in April 1846.

While the quality of his locomotives and the railway had increased, the rest of the London–Bristol line had become severely over-budget and delayed. Between Swindon and Bristol, the line is almost always on artificial ground or structure, and during the winter of 1839, the weather caused many embankments to give way. Two deadlines of August 1840 and February 1841 had passed, by which point there were still significant gaps in the line, in particular the Box Tunnel. Once the tunnel—then the longest on the British railway network at 1.83 miles (2.95 km)—was ready, the entire line was complete and ready for trains on 30 June 1841. The first journeys between London and Bristol took 5 1/2 hours, compared to road journeys of 15–20 hours; the final cost was £5,887,000, equivalent to £528,000,000 in 2025.

=== 1842–1846: Railway Mania and the Gauge War ===
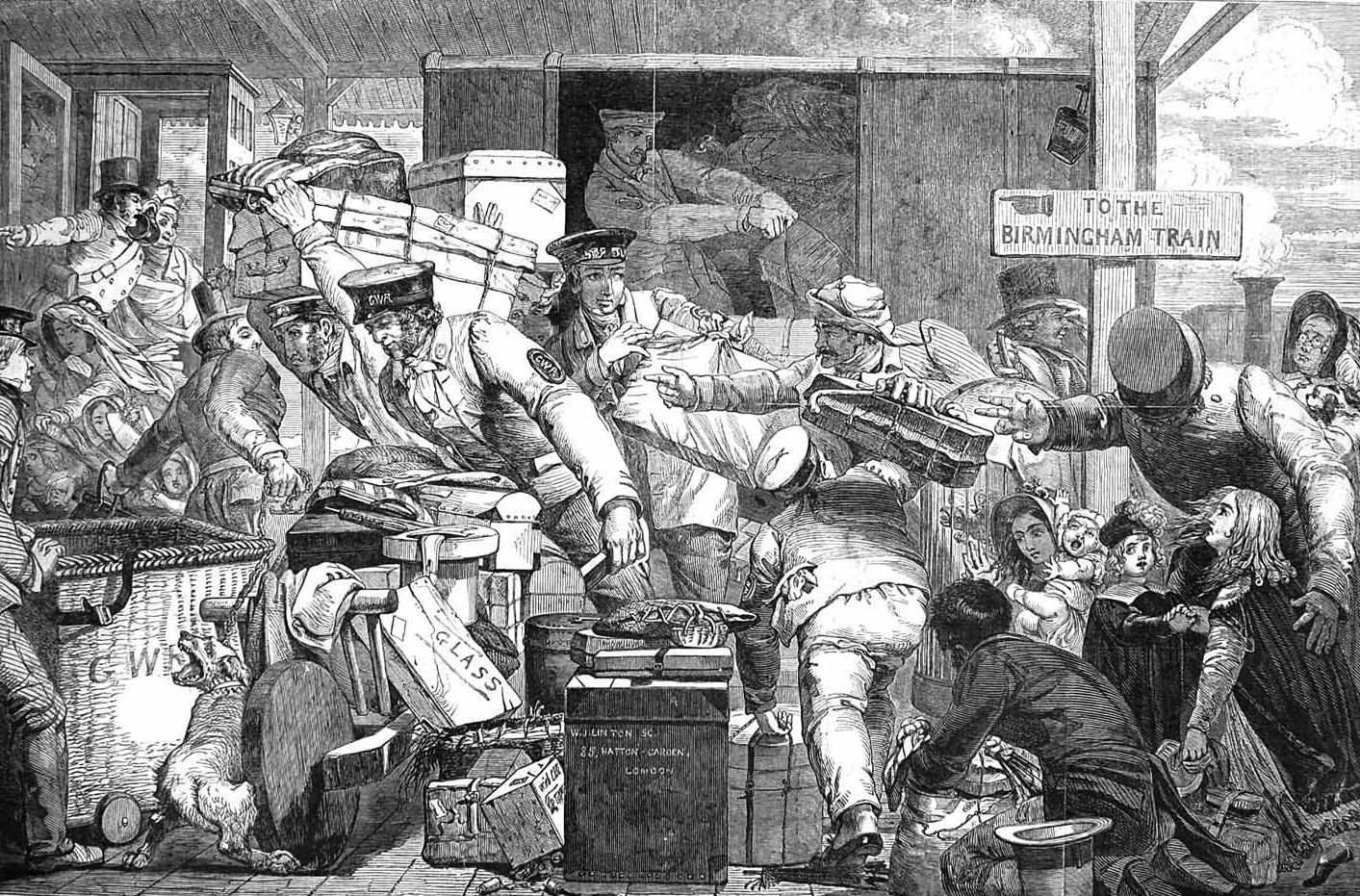
A political cartoon published in The Illustrated London News in 1846, showing people trying to change between gauges at Gloucester

By the 1840s, the United Kingdom was in Railway Mania—Parliament passed 650 railway acts between 1845 and 1848, and engineers and railway companies were desperate to find alternatives to steam engines. One consequence of this was that railways were beginning to branch out, with Britain covered in small lines. As these lines began to link up, a problem arose for the GWR, whose broad gauge was incompatible with most other railways' narrower gauge. Brunel's broad gauge railway was simply faster—the first London to Exeter train covered 194 miles (312 km) in 4 2/3 hours, making the GWR's services the fastest in the world at the time. However, it was simply outcompeted by Stephenson's gauge, which had spread across the country. Brunel's influence let the broad gauge spread in the West and Wales, such as the South Wales Railway, of which he became Chief Engineer in 1844. Once these railways then spread northwards and eastwards, locations such as Gloucester and Swindon became served by railways with different, incompatible gauges, and goods trains would wait for hours as their cargo was transferred between different-gauged wagons.

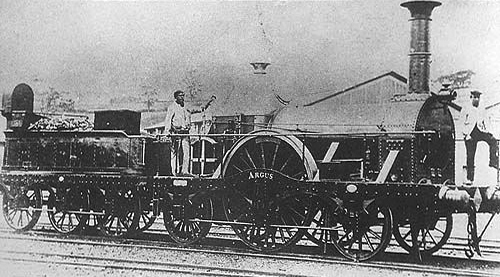
Argus, the same class as Ixion, which won the speed race proposed by Brunel

In July 1845, a royal commission was created to research the optimum gauge for the country, a conflict which had become known as the "Gauge War". The commission began its hearing on 6 August 1845, and Brunel was called to give evidence from 25 October, answering two-hundred questions. Brunel's argument was twofold: firstly, no single gauge was needed because such a war created beneficial competition between companies; and secondly, that the broad gauge was, as Brunel had always claimed, a better choice of engineering, because it allowed for faster and more comfortable services. Brunel naively suggested a race between the two gauges' locomotives, even though the newest broad-gauge locomotive was three years of age compared to many newly built narrower-gauge locomotives. Engine A, representing the narrower of the gauges, ran the 44-mile (71 km) Darlington–York section of line, whereas Ixion, a Firefly class representing the broader of the gauges, ran the 53-mile (85 km) Paddington–Didcot section of line. Despite its older age, Ixion kept an average speed of 53 miles per hour (85 km/h); when Engine A reached this speed on its run, it derailed.

In spite of the evidence Brunel sought to demonstrate, their report, published in 1846, was in favour of the narrower gauge to become the new 'standard gauge'. The commission argued the most important factor was having only one gauge in the country, and the hassle of converting the narrower gauge to the broader gauge was too significant. Brunel refused to accept defeat and lobbied Parliament with his own fifty-page report on why the commission was wrong to decide against him, and while the decision was not reversed, Parliament permitted Brunel and the GWR to continue building in his gauge. His adamance of broader gauges' superiority eventually became irrelevant in the face of its financial inferiority; the GWR would eventually convert their broad gauge track to the new standard gauge, starting in the 1860s after Brunel's death and finishing on 21 May 1892, when remaining stock was consigned to temporary yards at Swindon awaiting dismantling. William Stanier ordered historical locomotives to be scrapped too, such as North Star. (Note: This was an attitude held by the GWR throughout its time; the only locomotive they kept as a historical item was GWR 3700 Class 3440 City of Truro.) In the modern day, some high-speed railways have reverted to broader gauges, such as the Japanese Shinkansen.

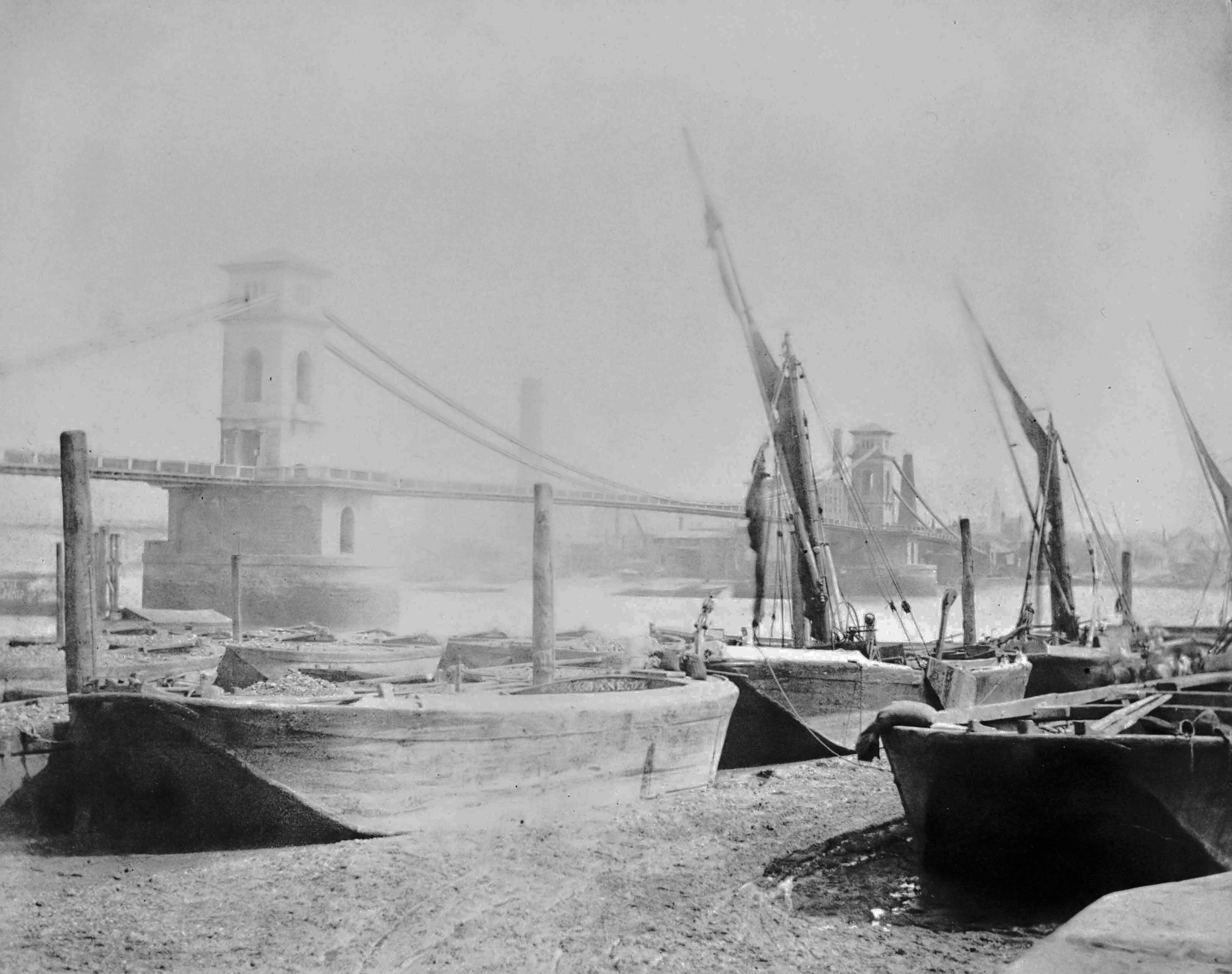
The Hungerford Bridge in 1845, designed by Brunel

It was during this period that Brunel designed the first Hungerford Bridge, the purpose of which was originally to serve the newly-renovated Hungerford Market. An act of parliament had been approved in 1836, and the land had been bought in 1840. The bridge was constructed between 1841 and 1845, and upon opening on 1 May 1845, it was a pedestrian-only suspension bridge. Brunel designed the bridge with two piers in the river, built from brick and in an Italian style, and using chain suspension. In 1859, the replacement of the bridge with a railway bridge to serve the new Charing Cross railway station was approved, and the dismantling of the old bridge began in 1860. The chains and ironwork were used in the eventual construction of the Clifton Suspension Bridge after Brunel's death.

=== 1847–1848: The atmospheric railway ===
It was in the context of the Railway Mania that Brunel chose to build his atmospheric railway. In September 1844, Brunel had travelled with Gooch to Dún Laoghaire to visit their so-called 'atmospheric railway'. Invented by Samuel Clegg as an adaptation of a similar system for moving post, each train had no engine and was instead connected to a pipe. Air was pushed through the pipe by huge pumps at each end of the line, which contained the steam engines. One direction of the line was uphill, using the pump system; the other was downhill and gravity-based. At the same time, the South Devon Railway (SDR) was building a line between Exeter and Penzance; this line was an independent company but would carry through trains from the GWR. Brunel realised that he could use this atmospheric system on the SDR, in part because it allowed him to pursue a more direct route with steeper inclines than otherwise, and he planned to build a test section as far as Teignmouth.

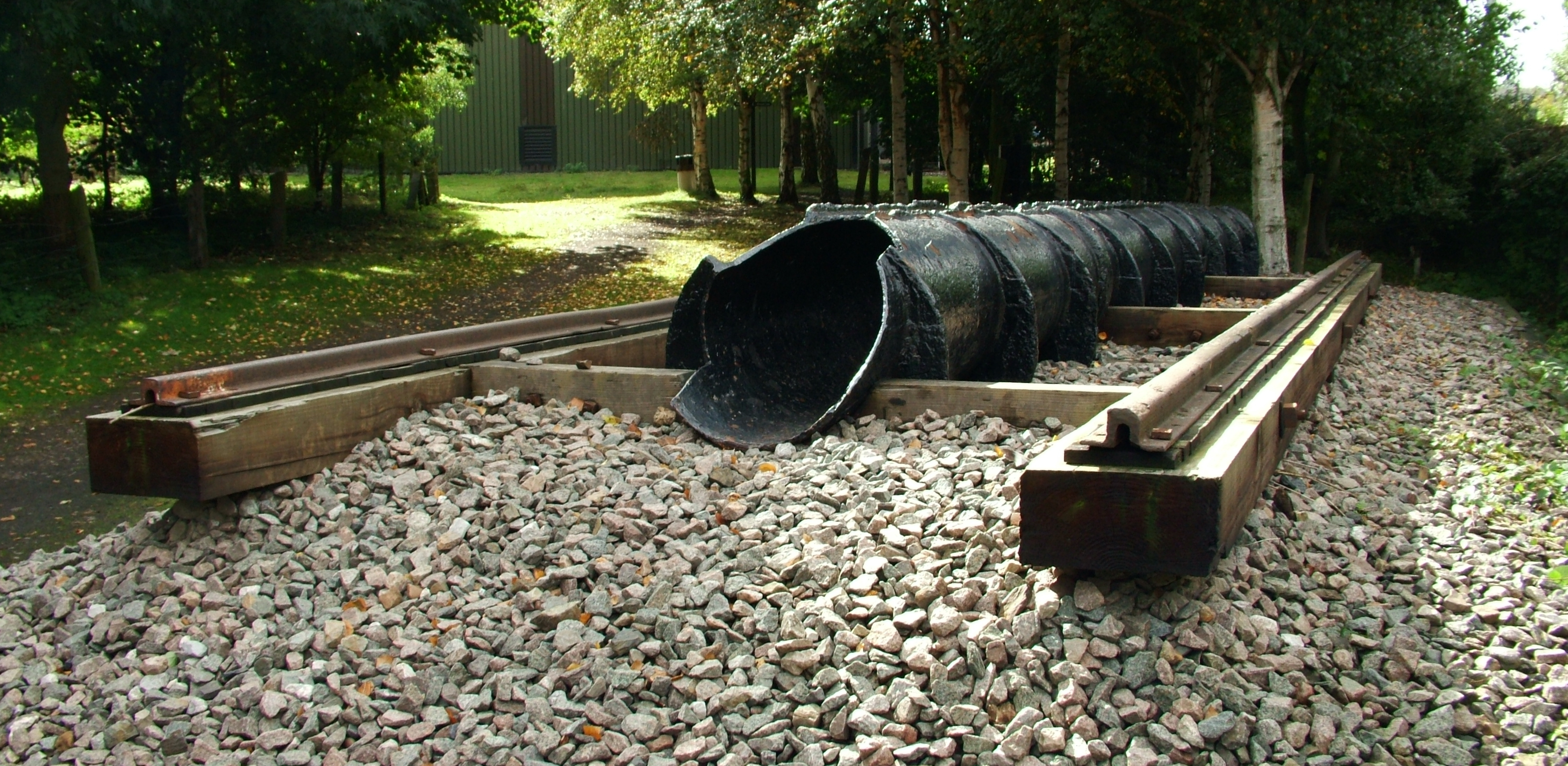
A reconstruction of Brunel's atmospheric railway, using a segment of the original piping at Didcot Railway Centre (Note: The pipe shown was of a larger diameter than those in place and had been ordered in hopes of improving performance, but the project was abandoned before it could be installed, and it was repurposed as a storm drain at Goodrington Sands.)

The atmospheric railway had many flaws—the driver had little control of the train, which could lead to deadly accidents, and keeping the pipes airtight over long distances was difficult. Both Brunel and William Cubitt believed in applying the concept to the British railways; George and Robert Stephenson thought it too impractical, as did Gooch. However, Brunel envisaged a 'green railway', in which passengers would not be bombarded with steam and ash, making the experience cleaner, quieter, and faster. The piping was so expensive that Brunel had to reduce the line to a single-track, and it opened to Teignmouth after delays on 13 September 1847. The line was built with pumping stations at 2-mile (3.2 km) intervals, designed with distinctive square chimneys; engine houses were also built further towards Plymouth and on the Torquay branch (now the Riviera line). There were eight pumping houses in total on the route, and a ninth at Torquay to serve a branch which never saw atmospheric traction. 15 in (380 mm) pipes were used on the level portions, and 22-inch (559 mm) pipes were intended for the steeper gradients.

The line had reached Newton Abbot by 10 January 1848, with trains able to run at approximately 68 miles per hour (109 km/h). Nevertheless, Brunel was proven wrong—the valve connecting the train to the pipe leaked constantly, and the pipe both froze solid in winter and was eaten by rats. Yet it was the deterioration of the valve—due to the reaction of tannin with iron oxide—that was the last straw that failed the project, as the continuous valve began to tear from its rivets over most of its length, and the estimated replacement cost of £25,000 (equivalent to £2,573,000 in 2025) was considered prohibitive. The railway closed for conversion back to a normal railway on 10 September 1848, having operated for less than a year, and Cubitt's line in London had closed the previous year equally as unsuccessful.

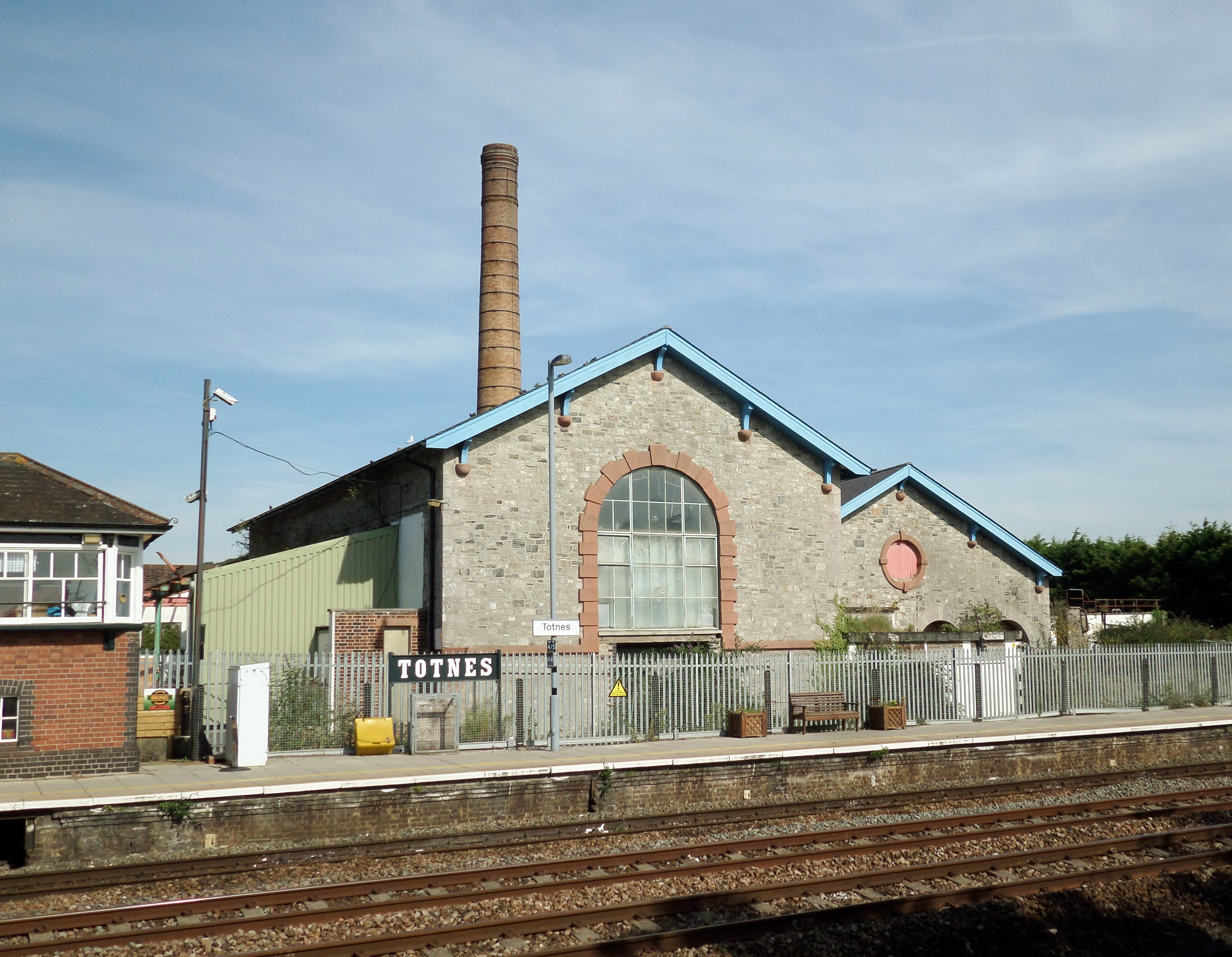
The Grade II listed Totnes engine house

The accounts of the SDR for 1848 suggest that atmospheric traction had cost 3s 1d per mile (0.15p/mi) per mile compared to 1s 4d per mile (0.07p/mi) for conventional steam power; this does not account for the many issues after construction, some of which were never solved. Humiliated, Brunel paid off the £434,000 of costs himself and did not help the company again; however, the idea proved that the higher speeds achieved on atmospheric railways could be reached by conventional trains as well. Though he did not accept responsibility for the efficacy of the pipes, he did admit his engine houses were of unsatisfactory power. Three of the eight engine houses still stand, at Totness, Starcross, and Torquay. The Totness engine house was made a Grade II listed structure on 7 March 2008. A section of the pipe, without the leather covers, is preserved at the Didcot Railway Centre.

At the end of November 1847, the Railway Mania had abruptly ended when the stock market collapsed in response to companies going bankrupt from the intensity of the Gauge War. Thousands of individuals, including many from the GWR, were left unemployed and the viability of Brunel's major projects was hugely jeopardised. In an act of sympathy, Brunel and his associates gave 3.5% of their annual salary to a charity fund for those made redundant, but it was this experience that made Brunel realise that the railway industry could no longer be so unrestrained and ambitious. By that point, he had been ridiculed by the Gauge War and the Atmospheric Railway, and the financial support had evaporated.

=== 1849–1859: The Royal Albert Bridge ===
The SDR extended from Devon into Cornwall, which involved crossing the River Tamar. William Moorsom was originally contracted to engineer the line, and suggested a train ferry over the Hamoaze; he was replaced by Brunel when Parliament rejected this idea. Brunel chose to cross the river at Saltash as the river there is only 1,100 feet (340 m) wide, and proposed the railway cross on what would one day become the Royal Albert Bridge. Brunel wanted to build a timber-span bridge with six piers at a height of 70 feet (21 m), but this was rejected by the Admiralty who needed to use the river for ships, and so he redesigned the bridge as having one pier in the centre of the river and one 465-foot (142 m) span either side to the riverbank, at a height of 100 feet (30 m).

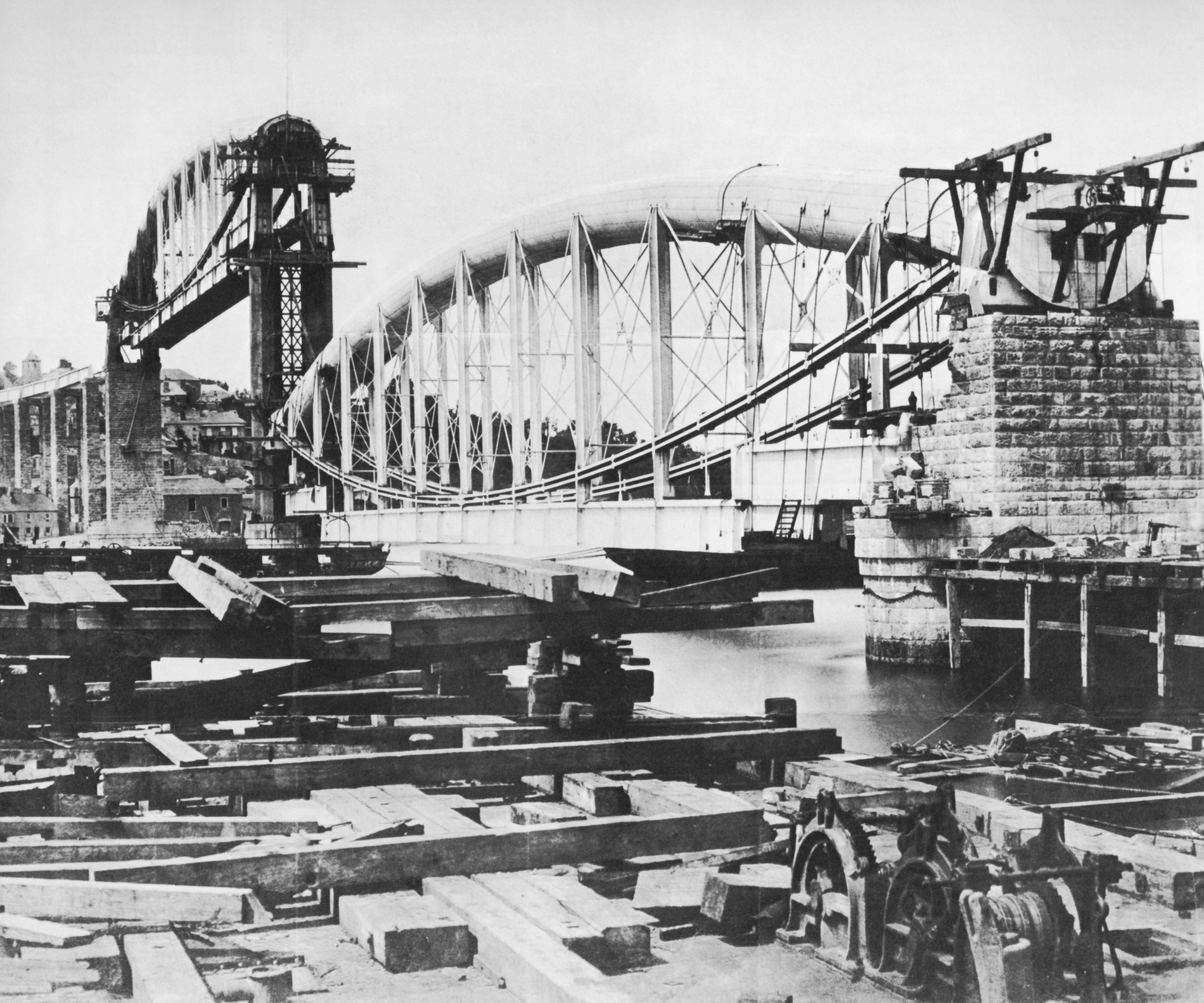
The bridge with one span in place and the other being lifted

The greatest challenge was surveying the riverbed as the river was 70 feet (21 m) in depth and too murky for divers to see anything; Brunel used a caisson to drain sections of water in 35 different places and map the rock formations. He then used the Chepstow Railway Bridge as a test as it had a similar design; safety was a major issue as the construction work was in the aftermath of the Dee Bridge disaster. Brunel's design for the bridge, taking into account the shortfalls of the Dee Bridge, was based on placing wrought iron trusses above the railway which, when compressed together, would naturally hold the railway in place below. In what his biographer Annabel Gillings calls an "incredibly ingenious design", Brunel made the bridge self-supporting rather than relying on its weight being held by structures on either end.

The industry had not recovered from the stock market crash of 1847 even by April 1852, when Brunel reduced the bridge to a single-track design in order to allow construction to begin. Not willing to risk failure once again, Brunel built a substantial caisson rather than the normal cofferdam in the river to build the pier, ensuring that the underwater work was successful. Brunel designed a pressurised caisson to withstand the water from outside, one of its first uses in Great Britain. The bridge was also mostly prefabricated—the caisson and trusses were all built on land and then lowered and lifted into place respectively. The construction of the bridge attracted great local attention, with as many as 300,000 people at once. On 2 May 1859, Prince Albert opened the bridge, but Brunel was not present as he was too ill; services finally commenced on 4 May 1859. After Brunel's poor outlook in 1847, four of his five major projects having failed or halted, the Royal Albert Bridge served as one of his most famous successes.

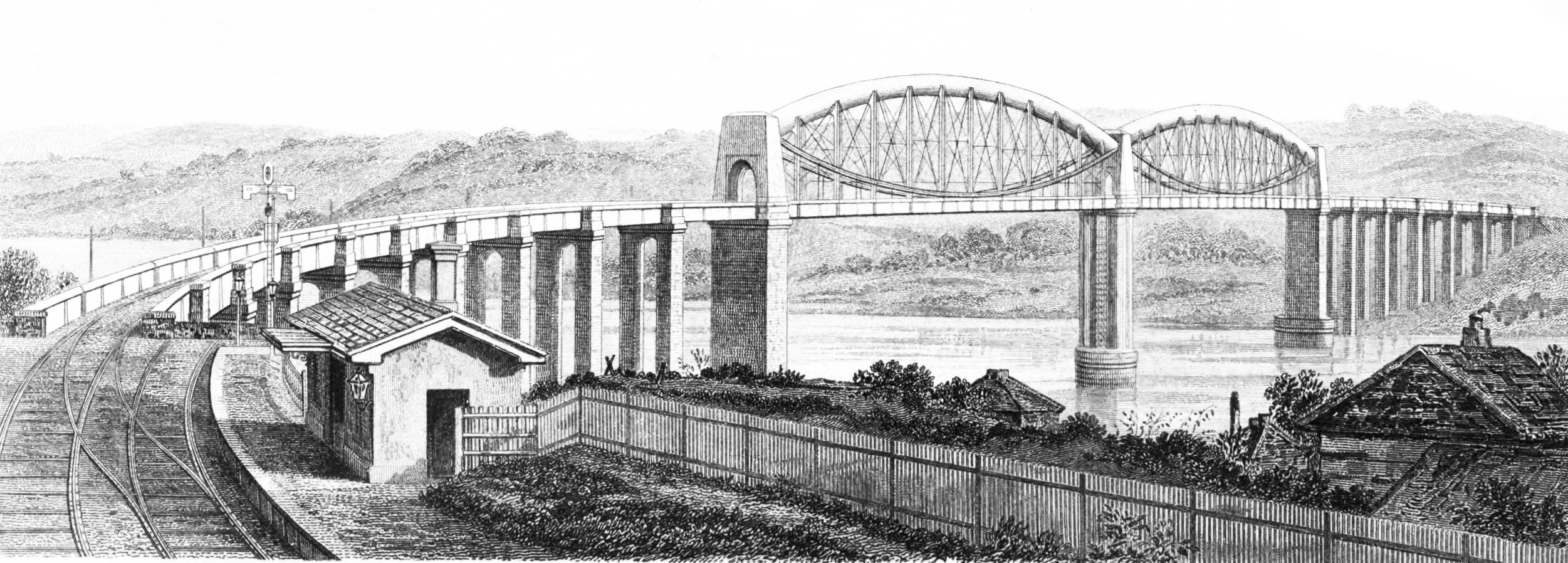
An engraving of the Royal Albert Bridge soon after opening in 1859

=== Other railway ventures ===
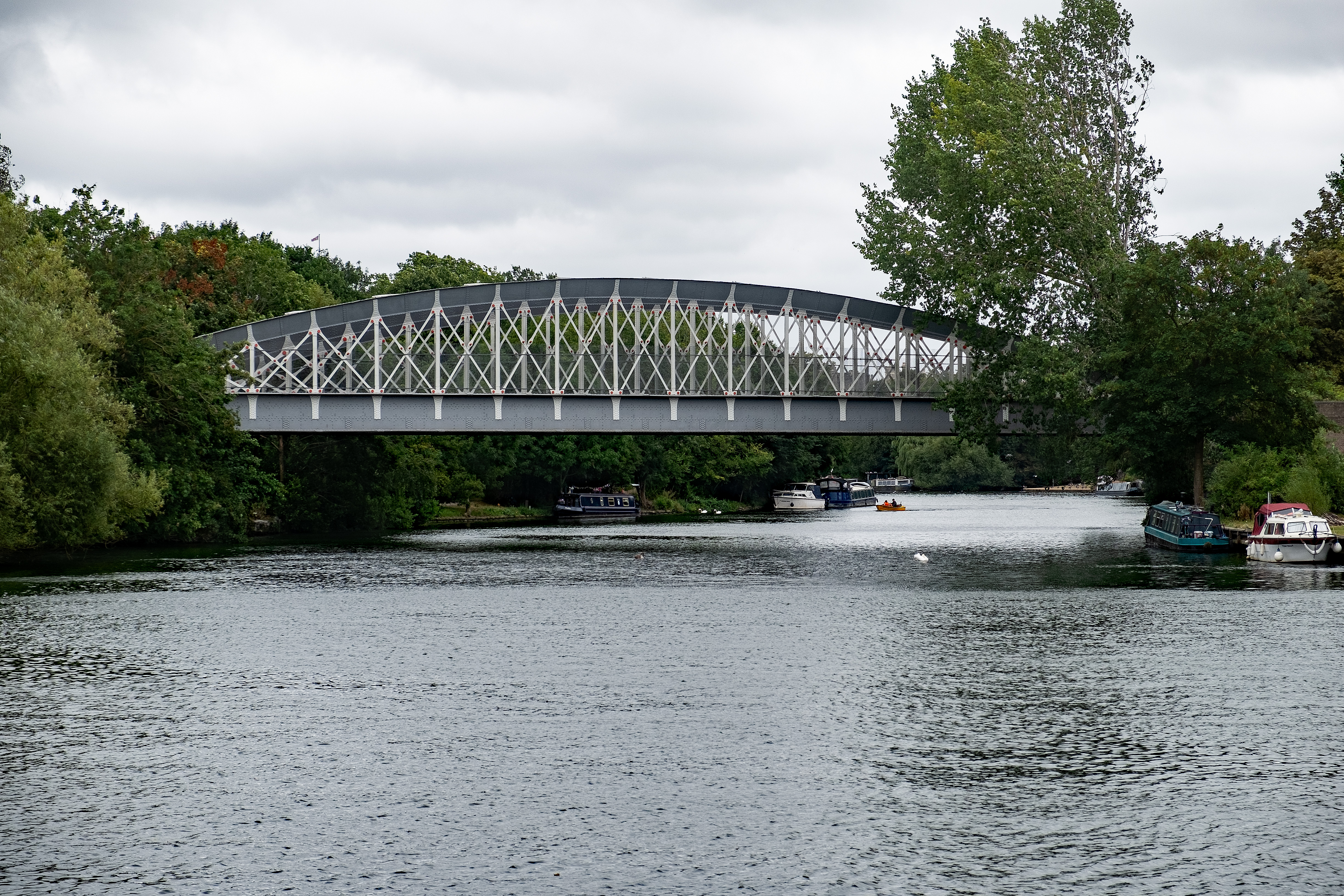
The Windsor Railway Bridge as seen from the River Thames

Brunel's other notable railway infrastructure includes the Windsor Railway Bridge, the seawall of the Exeter–Plymouth line, and the original Chepstow Railway Bridge. The Engineer wrote that the bridges were the most imposing part of Brunel's railways, and that his methods, though often criticised, were cutting-edge in their advancement of bridge-building techniques. Throughout his railway building career, but particularly on the South Devon and Cornwall Railways where economy was needed and there were many valleys to cross, Brunel made extensive use of wood for the construction of substantial viaducts; these have had to be replaced over the years as their primary material, Kyanised Baltic Pine, became uneconomical to obtain.

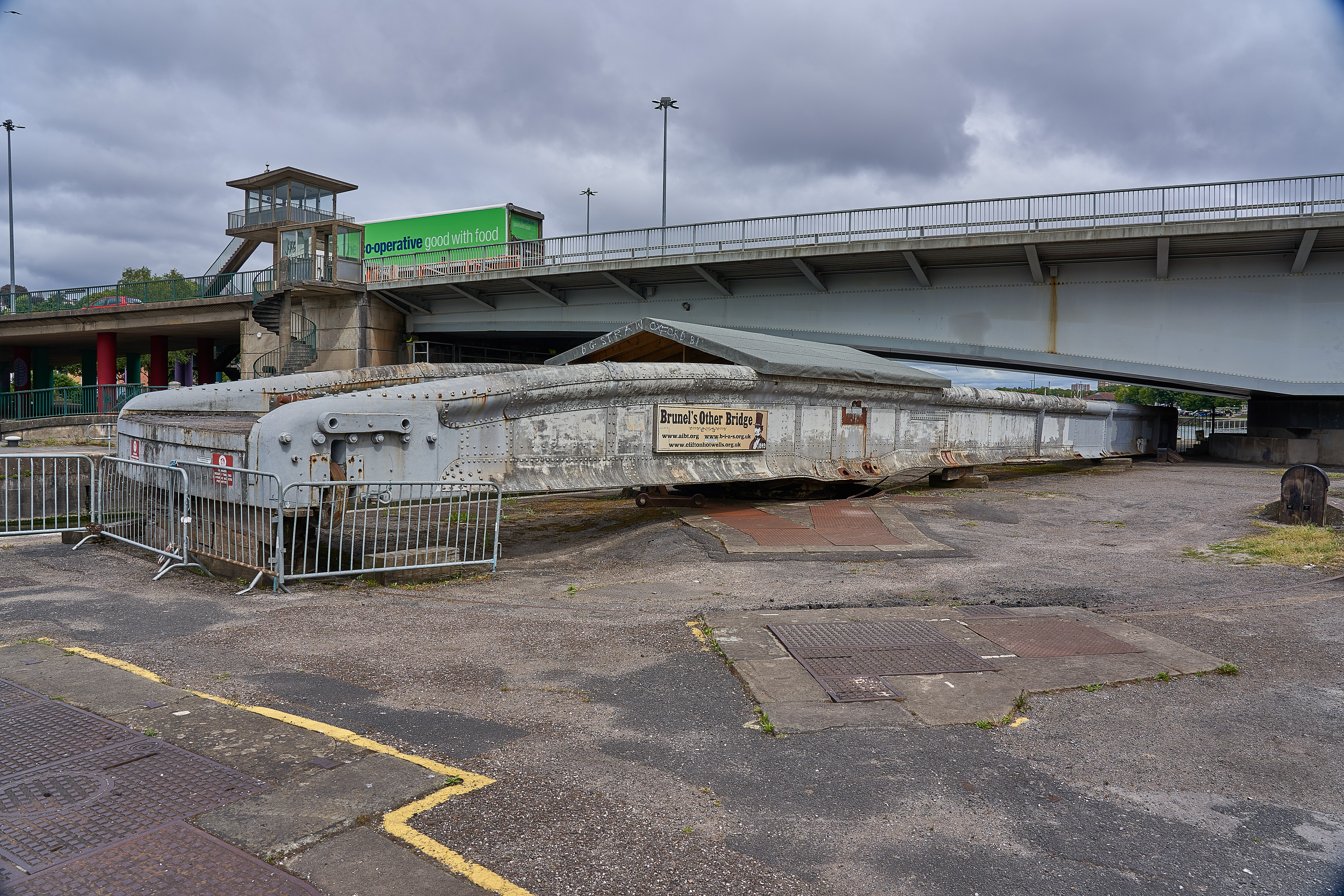
The Brunel Swivel Bridge in Bristol

In 1832, Brunel was commissioned by the Bristol Dock Company to rebuild the locks on the entrance to their new floating harbour. The River Avon, whose tidality had impaired the function of Bristol as a port, was dammed and diverted, and the level of the docks was instead controlled by a series of locks. In 1842, Brunel began extending the width of the south lock, which is now eponymous to him and Grade II* listed; he used a single-panel gate design, which meant a new bridge needed to be built to allow people to cross into and out of the harbour. His design, the Brunel Swivel Bridge, was completed in 1850. In 1873, it was moved to its current position by the northern lock, and it was made Grade II* listed in 1972. It is included on Historic England's Heritage at Risk Register.

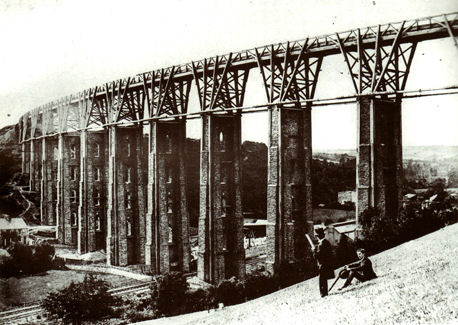
Moorswater Viaduct at Liskeard, Cornwall as built

The 70 miles (110 km) of the Cornwall Railway between Plymouth and Truro crossed 45 rivers and deep valleys. Brunel spanned 42 of these with partly- or entirely-timber viaducts of various types. Workshops were established at Lostwithiel, with excess timber being used for the station buildings. The original viaducts are dated 1859, the year the railway opened, but many still on active railway have had their timber frames partially or entirely replaced. Between Saltash and St Germans, a deviation line was built in 1908, eliminating the wooden viaducts on the bypassed section of line. Those on the Falmouth branch were all replaced between 1923 and 1934. These timber viaducts allowed Brunel to build his broad gauge lines across challenging terrain at low cost, allowing him to expand them in vain of the increasingly-futile choice of gauge.

On 21 December 1850, Brunel was tasked by the GWR to rebuild London Paddington, which was quickly becoming too small for its traffic. He presented his preliminary design on 2 January 1851, and unusually for him, he was happy to work with other architects and engineers on the project, including Matthew Digby Wyatt. His relocated Paddington had a 700-foot-long (210 m) trainshed with ten platforms. While the first train departed on 16 January 1854, the project did not see completion until 1855. Alongside the new station building, new depots and offices were built, alongside the Great Western Royal Hotel, opened by Prince Albert on 8 June 1854.

== Shipping career ==
=== 1835–1842: Origins and the Great Western ===
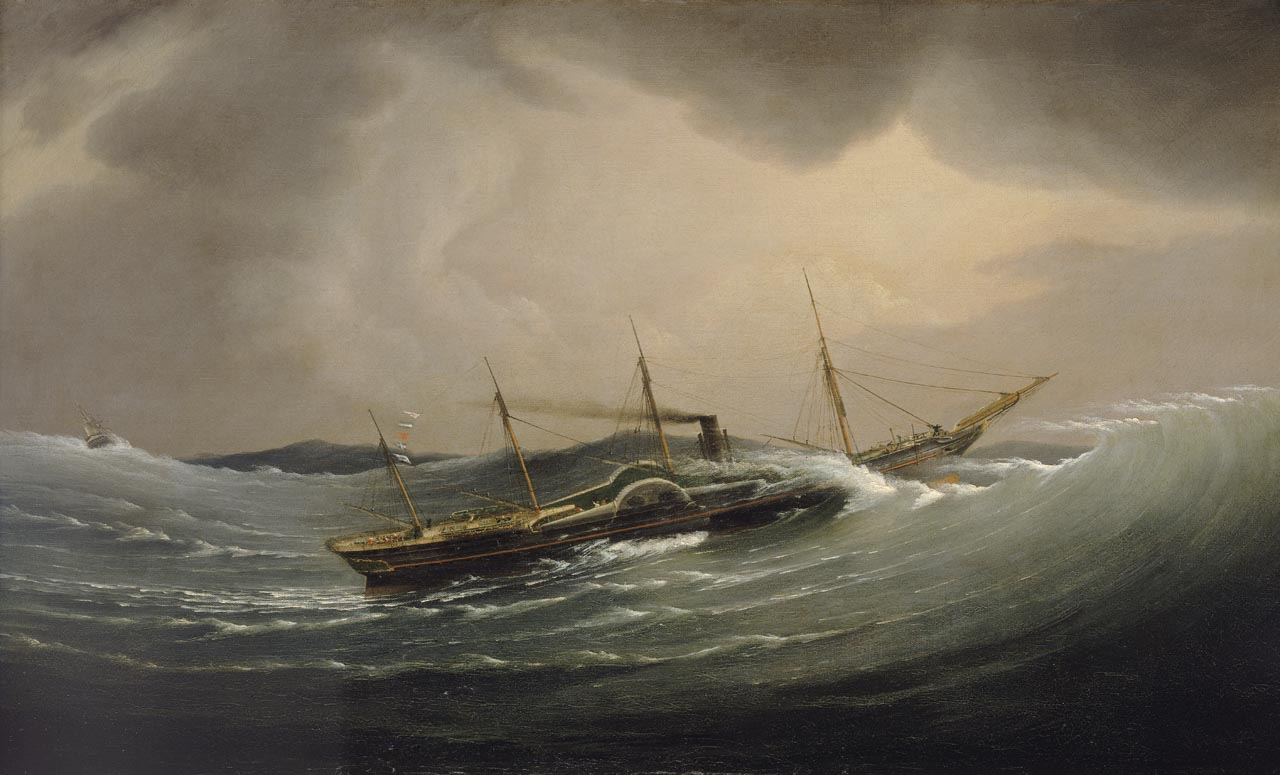
The Great Western Riding a Tidal Wave by Joseph Walter, 1844

Brunel's entry in the Dictionary of National Biography describes his maritime career as the source of his "greatest fame". When asked about the necessity of the Great Western Main Line's length in an 1835 meeting of the GWR's directors, Brunel replied: "Why not make it longer, and have a steamboat to go from Bristol to New York and call it the Great Western?" While originally a witty remark met with dissatisfaction, the board had agreed by October of that year, and the Great Western Steamship Company (GWSC) was formed. It was Brunel's vision that passengers would be able to purchase one ticket at London Paddington and travel from London to New York, changing from the Great Western Railway to the Great Western steamship at the former's terminus in Neyland, West Wales.

Technological developments in the early 1830s had made longer journeys possible, but it was generally thought that a ship would not be able to carry enough fuel for the trip and have room for commercial cargo. However, general technological advancements at the time were yet to be consolidated within the shipping industry, partially because it was still structured from a very craftsmanship-based perspective, and advances in the industry primarily being sailpower-related. At the time, steamboats were only used for shorter journeys, and Dionysus Lardner once again opposed Brunel by suggesting that a transatlantic steamboat would be mathematically impossible, quipping that anyone seeking to have a steamboat go from Liverpool to New York "might as well talk of making a voyage from New York or Liverpool to the moon".

Brunel, however, disproved Lardner; Brunel showed the amount a ship could carry increased as the cube of its dimensions, whereas the amount of resistance a ship experienced from the water as it travelled increased by only a square of its dimensions. His calculations thus demonstrated a bigger ship would be smoother, faster, and more fuel-efficient than a smaller equivalent. Brunel's design for the boat made it, at the time, the largest in the world, with a 236-foot (72 m) hull, 250-foot (76 m) keel, and displacement of 2,300 tonnes (2,300 long tons; 2,500 short tons). This gave it around twice the size and power of the next-largest ship at the time, with an output of approximately 450 horsepower (340 kW). The ship was constructed at Wapping Wharf in Bristol Harbour, beginning with the hull in 1835–1836; a March 1836 prospectus costed the ship at £35,000, equivalent to £3,500,000 in 2025.

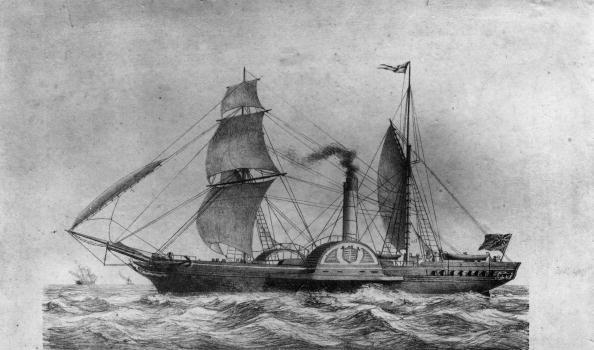
The Great Western was beaten to New York by the SS Sirius (pictured).

Great Western was constructed mainly from wood, but Brunel added bolts and iron diagonal reinforcements to maintain the keel's strength. In addition to its steam-powered paddle wheels, the ship carried four masts for sails. She was launched without her steam engine on 19 July, and sailed by wind power to London from 18 August to receive them. In early trials, she was able to maintain speeds of 11 knots (20 km/h; 13 mph). The British and American Steam Navigation Company, hoping to beat the GWSC, used their much smaller ship SS Sirius in order to attempt to win the race to New York. Sirius left on 28 March 1838 with twenty-two passengers, and the Great Western left later on 31 March. However, after two hours at sea, there was a fire on the ship, during which Brunel fell 20 feet (6.1 m) from a ladder while descending it, breaking his leg and dislocating his shoulder.

The fire set the ship back, and it was only relaunched from Avonmouth, Bristol, on 8 April, with Brunel far too injured to be on board, and the passenger numbers severely lower: the ship was carrying 610 tonnes (600 long tons; 670 short tons) of coal, as well as its cargo and seven passengers on board. In spite of its later start, the Great Western arrived in New York later on the same day as the Sirius on 22 April. Unlike the Sirius, whose crew had been forced to burn its cargo for fuel, the Great Western had plenty to spare, proving Brunel's calculations correct. Having proven that such crossings could be made profitably, the Great Western made 67 crossings across her eight years of service, and held the Blue Riband with a final shortest crossing time of 13 days westbound and 12 days 6 hours eastbound. This made her the first steamboat to be used in regular ocean service; she was also used by the Royal Mail Steam Packet Company and to transport soldiers in the Crimean War, before being destroyed in 1857.

=== 1842–1852: The Great Britain ===
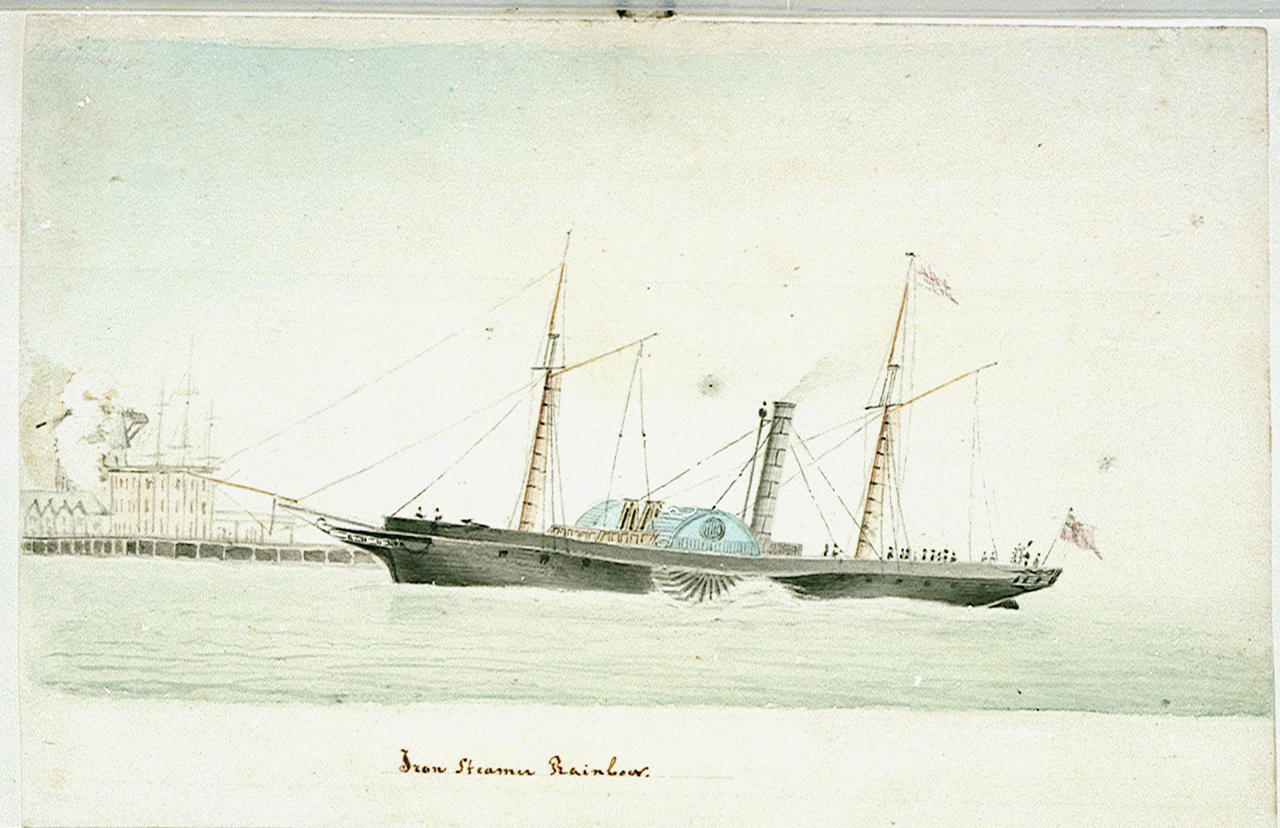
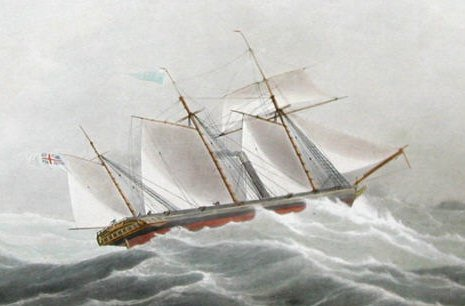
Brunel's influences for the Great Britain: the SS Rainbow and SS Archimedes

The service of the Great Western was commercially successful enough for a second ship to be required, which Brunel was asked to design. Originally, the Great Western Steamship Company wanted to build a sister ship for the Great Western, but Brunel preferred to build a better successor. In October 1838, Brunel saw the SS Rainbow in Bristol, which had been built with an iron hull, and had the idea to transpose this to his transatlantic steamships. At 3,444 tonnes (3,390 long tons; 3,796 short tons), Brunel's design was around seven times larger than other iron-hull boats of the time, and would be physically too large to fit in Bristol Harbour, so a dry dock had to be constructed alongside it. Despite others' reservations towards using an iron hull, Brunel realised only it could be used to expand the ship as much as he wished.

Construction on the ship began on 18 July 1839 in Wapping Wharf; at the time, she was nicknamed Mammoth. In May 1840, Brunel was inspired once again when he saw the SS Archimedes; the boat used the newer propeller, but was only 200 tonnes (200 long tons; 220 short tons), 17 times smaller than Brunel's plans. Brunel stopped work on the new ship and hired Archimedes for further testing, in order to ascertain whether the propeller or more conventional paddle wheel was better. In December 1840, he ordered the effective reconstruction of the ship to include the—in his opinion, preferential—propeller engine, and making Great Britain the largest ship to do so at the time.

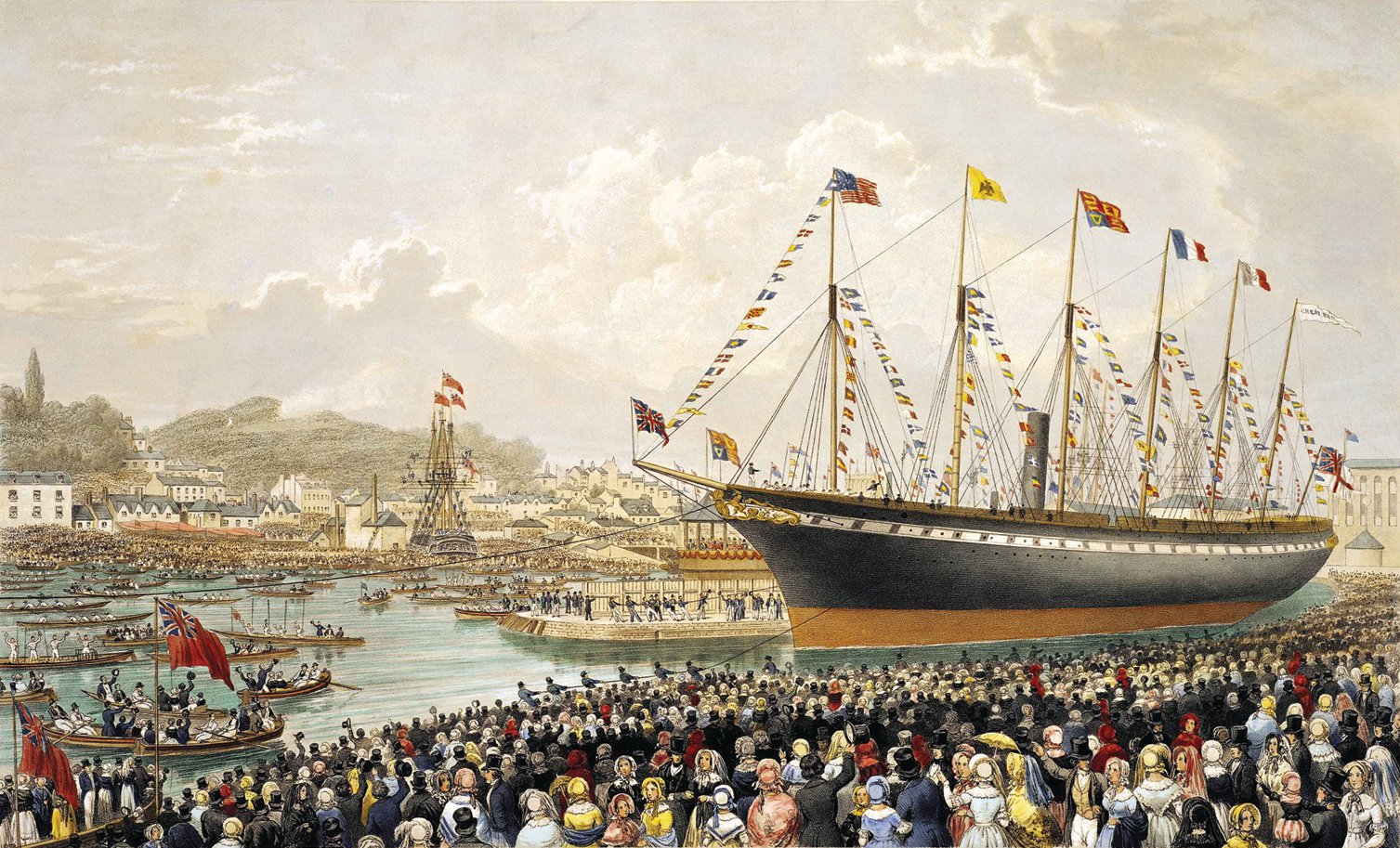
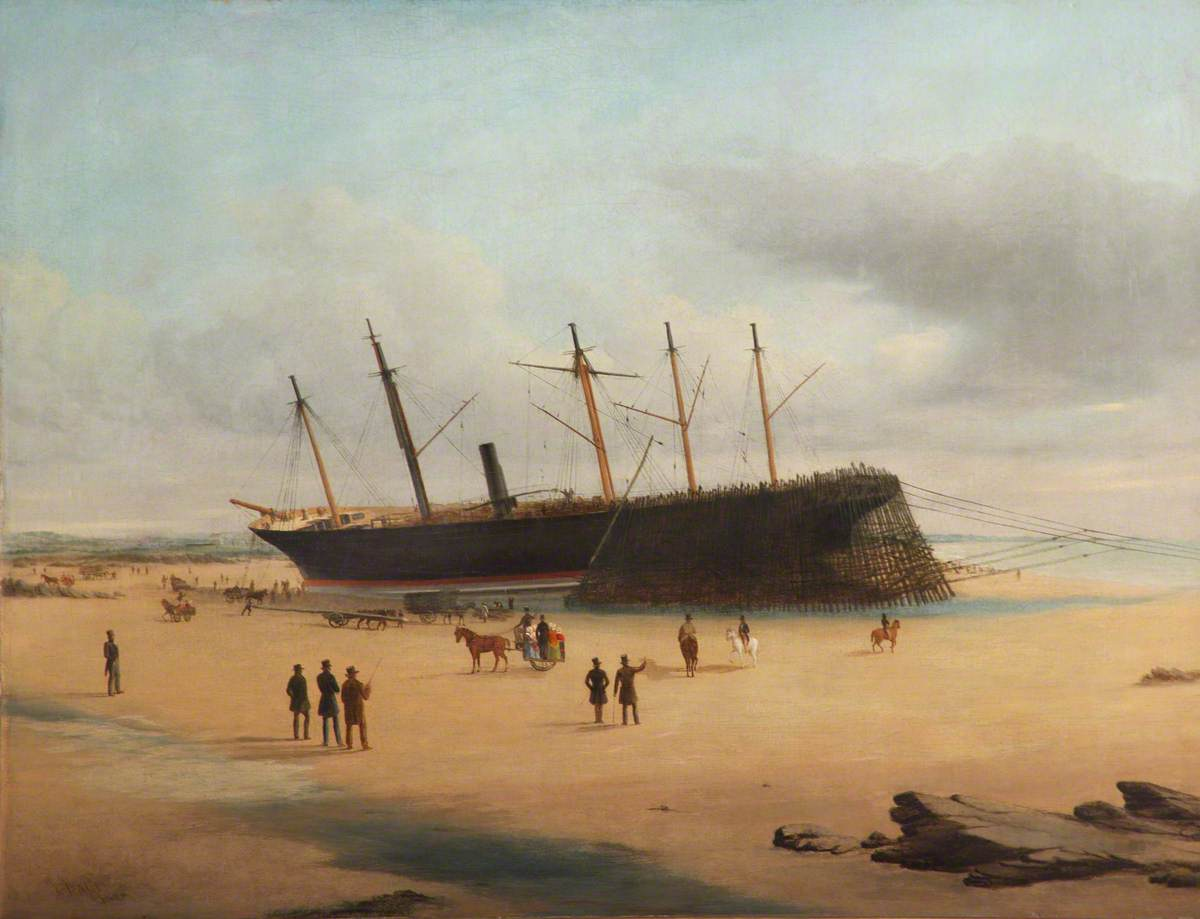
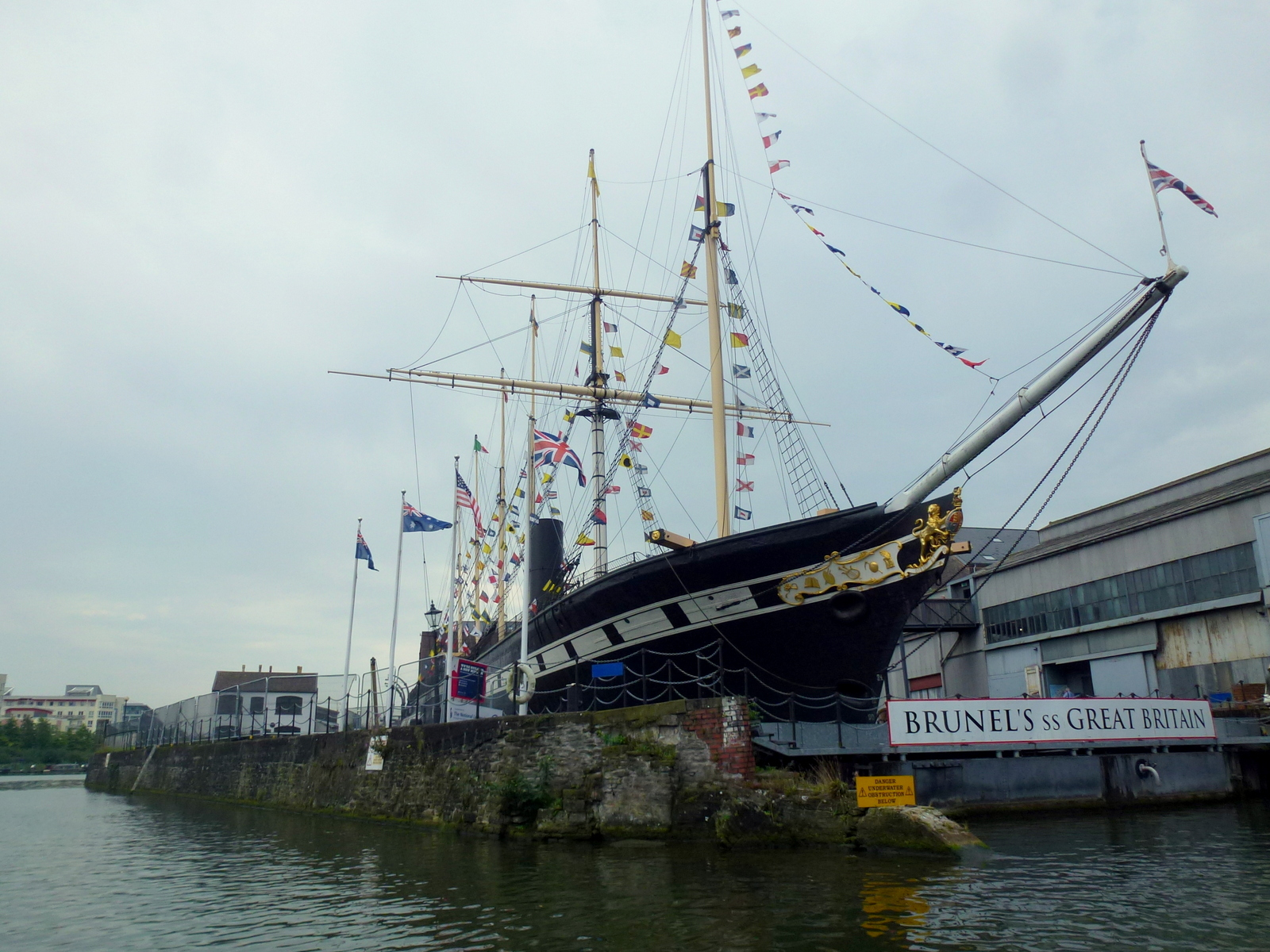
Top: The launch of the SS Great Britain in 1843

Middle: The ship stranded at Dundrum Bay in Northern Ireland

Bottom: The restored ship in 2016

Brunel's design for the propeller-driven ship gave it a brake horsepower of 1,600 bhp (1,200 kW), compared to the 450 bhp (340 kW) of the Great Western, and incorporated a large six-bladed propeller; the total length was 322 feet (98 m). Owing to her design, Great Britain is considered the first modern ship, being built of metal rather than wood, powered by an engine rather than wind or oars, and driven by a propeller rather than a paddle wheel. At the time of her creation, the Great Britain was more than twice the weight of the Great Western, and the largest in the world. Brunel's experiments with propellers caught the attention of the Navy, who asked him for help applying the technology to battleships; Brunel had historically tried to avoid any form of government or bureaucracy but relented as he realised it could be to his benefit. At first the Navy wished to use the technology on HMS Acheron, but Brunel convinced them otherwise, and instead they chose HMS Rattler. Brunel fitted her with a propeller and the appropriate engines in 1842, and the project was a success, with all new Navy ships utilising the propeller from 1845. In the end, Brunel received no pay nor credit for his work. (Note: Brunel was treated particularly poorly by the Navy: they tried to block the work they had originally asked of him; they accused him of vandalising a model ship to support his technology; and then they ignored his objections to using HMS Acheron until he threatened to resign.)

On 19 July 1843, the completed ship was launched in Bristol by Prince Albert; (Note: Great Britain was originally supposed to be christened by the wife of the GWSC director John Miles, who had done the same for the Great Western, but her bottle of champagne missed the boat.) on 23 January she travelled to London with an average speed of 12.5 knots (23.2 km/h; 14.4 mph), and by March the following year, she was ready for service. However, Bristol Harbour had not been expanded as promised, and so there was nowhere for the ship to go; this led Brunel and his team to have to dismantle some of the harbour stonework to widen the path for the ship. On 26 July 1845, all setbacks having been overcome, the Great Britain set sail to New York, this time departing from Liverpool; the journey was completed in 14 days and 21 hours, and she became the first iron-hulled ship and the first propeller-driven ship to cross the Atlantic Ocean. During her fifth transatlantic journey on the night of 22–23 September 1846, outdated maps and low visibility led them to run aground in Dundrum Bay in Northern Ireland, when the crew thought they were near the Isle of Man. The ship was carrying 180 passengers, the most ever on a transatlantic service at the time. The sound of the ship beaching in complete darkness led to chaos on board, and it was found to be completely unmovable. The iron frame of the ship meant that it was not severely damaged, but the company wrote it off anyway, which severely angered Brunel; after visiting the ship, he wrote:

The finest ship in the world [...] is lying like a useless saucepan kicking about on the most exposed shore that you can imagine, with no more effort or skill applied to protect the property than the said saucepan would have received on the beach at Brighton. As to the state of the ship, she is as straight and as sound as she ever was, as a whole. [...] It is beautiful to look at, and really how she can be talked of in the way she has been, even by you, I cannot understand. It is positively cruel; it would be like taking away the character of a young woman without any grounds whatever.

— Brunel describing the fate of the Great Britain in December 1846

Multiple attempts to protect the ship and cordon it off failed as the materials would simply be washed away by the tide. The ship was not returned to water until 27 August 1847, when the tide was high enough for HMS Birkenhead to tow it out of the bay and back to Bristol. However, in the process the GWSC went bankrupt and were forced to sell off their ships. The Great Britain was sold for a mere £18,000 in 1851, equivalent to £2,200,000 in 2025. Brunel, in spite of having caused the financial failure of the company, was hailed as a great designer and engineer for his work on the ship. After being sold, she was used for various purposes such as voyages to Australia and carrying coal from Wales to the United States. She was left at Sparrow Cove on the Falkland Islands from 1937 until 1970, when she was rescued and restored, a process that took 35 years to complete. She is currently fully preserved and has been open to the public at the Being Brunel museum in Bristol Harbour since 23 March 2018.

=== 1852–1859: The Great Eastern ===
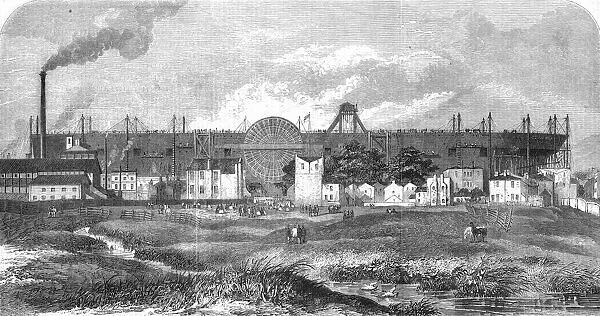
Napier Yard, shown with the half-completed ship in the background, as sketched from the Isle of Dogs

In 1852 Brunel turned to a third ship, larger than her predecessors, intended for voyages to India and Australia. The Great Eastern was cutting-edge technology for her time; Brunel's final design for the ship had a length of 700 ft (210 m), a width of 120 ft (37 m), and a displacement of 22,500 tonnes (22,100 long tons; 24,800 short tons). The overall capacity of the ship was over 4,000; this was able to be so large because Brunel used new designs, such as skylights, to place passenger cabins deep within the ship, whereas before they had to be close to the deck. Great Eastern was designed to cruise non-stop from London to Sydney and back, since engineers of the time mistakenly believed that Australia had no coal reserves. In July 1852, Brunel was appointed engineer to the Eastern Steam Navigation Company (ESNC), who wanted a ship that would allow them to be successful in the Far East market. Like many of Brunel's ambitious projects, the ship soon ran over budget and behind schedule in the face of a series of technical problems.

Due to the size of the ship, the ESNC had to raise £800,000 in order to fund its construction, equivalent to £96,600,000 in 2025. This had been completed by 1853, largely due to the contributions of Charles Geach, Morton Peto, and Thomas Brassey. However, there was an almost immediate setback when the main London shipyard owned by John Scott Russell, the main contractor, burnt down on 10 September 1853. This meant that Brunel was reliant on Geach to provide the materials for the ship, and that the ship would be built at Napier Yard, which was also owned by Scott Russell, instead. Construction began in spring 1854, and she was built parallel to the River Thames in order to be launched sideways into the river, as otherwise she would run aground while trying to enter.

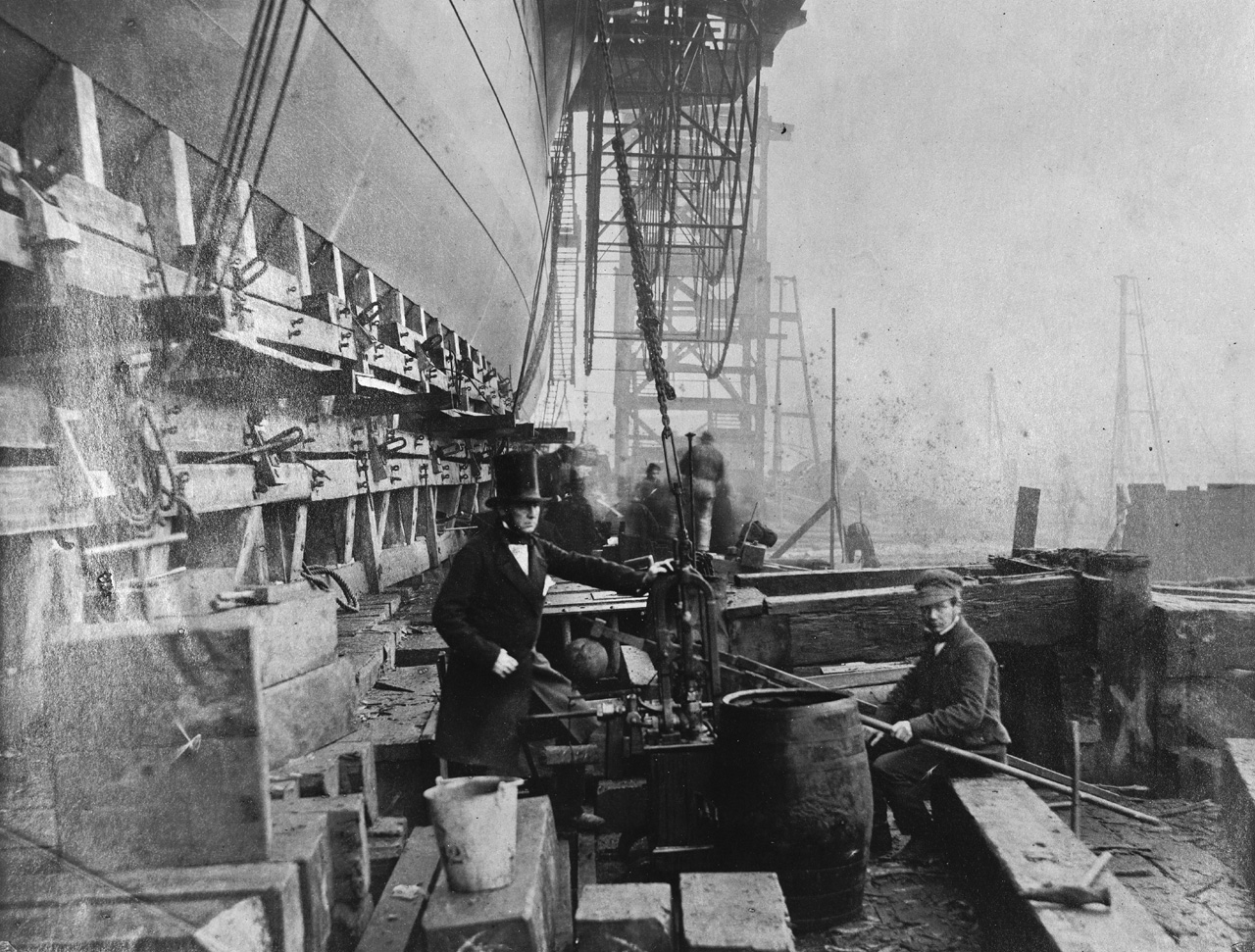
Brunel during the construction of the Great Eastern, 1857

Brunel's construction of the ship came with a number of innovations. Firstly, each of the parts used would be built to a standard specification no matter where they fit into the ship; secondly, the ship would be built with two concentric hulls connected by hexagonal braces, creating a weightless void in between while strengthening the ship. Over two thousand workers constructed the ship by hand, including moving the various components into place. Due to financial pressures, Scott Russell was forced to mortgage the dockyard but did not admit this to Brunel; this was the beginning of a strained relationship between the two, with Brunel accusing Scott Russell of trying to steal his fame and the credit for the design. A second fire in October 1855, which did not damage the ship directly, led to the two finally agreeing to delay the launching date. However, Brunel was still dissatisfied with Scott Russell's management style, in one letter writing to him:

For shame – if you are satisfied then I am sorry to give you trouble, but I think you will thank me for it. I wish you were my obedient servant, I should begin with a little flogging.

— Isambard Kingdom Brunel, letter to John Scott Russell, 2 October 1855

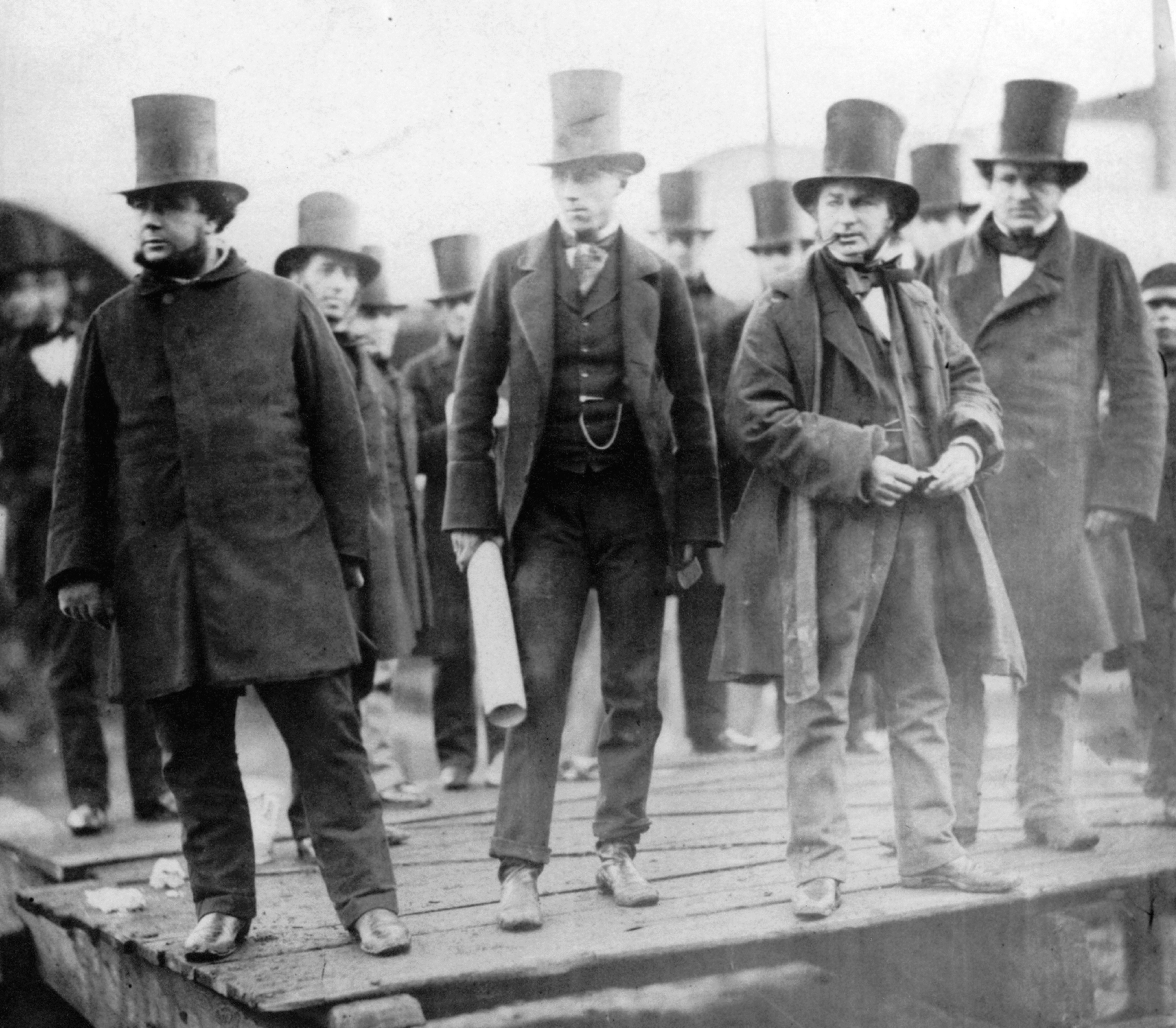
Brunel at the launch of the Great Eastern with John Scott Russell and Lord Derby, 1858

In January 1856, after Brunel accused Scott Russell of defrauding him, the latter's shipbuilding enterprise went entirely bankrupt, and work on the ship stopped. Eventually, the ESNC was given permission to use the Napier Yard until August 1857, and Scott Russell was allowed to continue with part of the construction. Brunel also thought that Scott Russell's plan for an uncontrolled launch of the ship was potentially dangerous, but that this was the principle on which the sideways launch had been designed. When she was still not ready to launch by October 1857, access to the Napier Yard and the ship was lost, and to save money, the ESNC was forced to only rehire the yard until 3 November, which gave Brunel little time to prepare the ship.

To generate income, the launch was made into a huge publicity event, much to Brunel's dissatisfaction, and the ship was accidentally named the SS Leviathan—its originally planned name—in the ceremony, despite its registered name being Great Eastern. After the ship moved down the slipway unexpectedly, killing a worker, the launch was aborted. In the aftermath, it appeared the measures Brunel had taken to make Scott Russell's plans safer had actually done the opposite, and, in the process, caused the disaster. After three more unsuccessful attempts on 28, 29, and 30 November, the ship was finally entered into the water in January 1858. (Note: Gillings (2006, p. 146–147) gives the date as 30 January; Harrison (1886, p. 144) and Brindle (2005, p. 211) gives the date as 31 January.) The total cost of the launch process had been £120,000, equivalent to £12,900,000 in 2025.

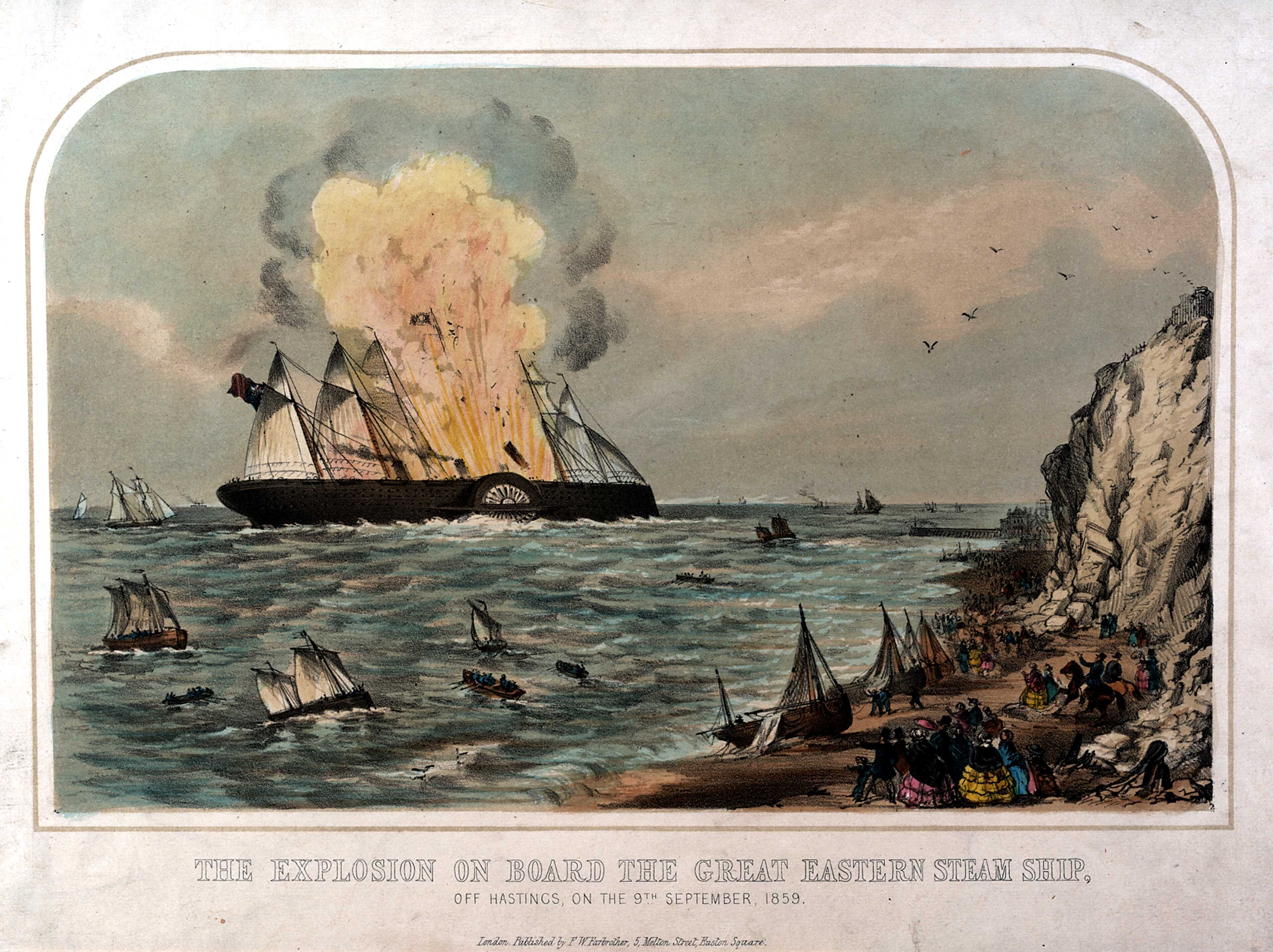
On 9 September 1859, an accidentally-closed stopcock caused a huge, fatal explosion aboard.

Contrary to Brunel's expectations, no fitting out had occurred on the ship by Autumn 1858, because the necessary £172,000 (equivalent to £18,500,000 in 2025) simply could not be raised. This was overcome by creating a replacement holding company for the ship, the Great Ship Company (GSC), whose shares could be sold to raise the money. The ship was complete by July 1859, with a banquet held on board on 8 August that Brunel was, by this point, too ill to attend. His final visit to the ship was on 5 September, shortly after which he suffered a stroke that left him bedridden for the rest of his life. The ship set sail without Brunel on 7 September; on 9 September, there was a huge explosion on board due to an accidentally disabled stopcock, which meant pressure built up within the ship until one of the funnels exploded. Five people died from burns caused by steam flooding the boiler room. Brunel did not live to hear the result of the inquiry.

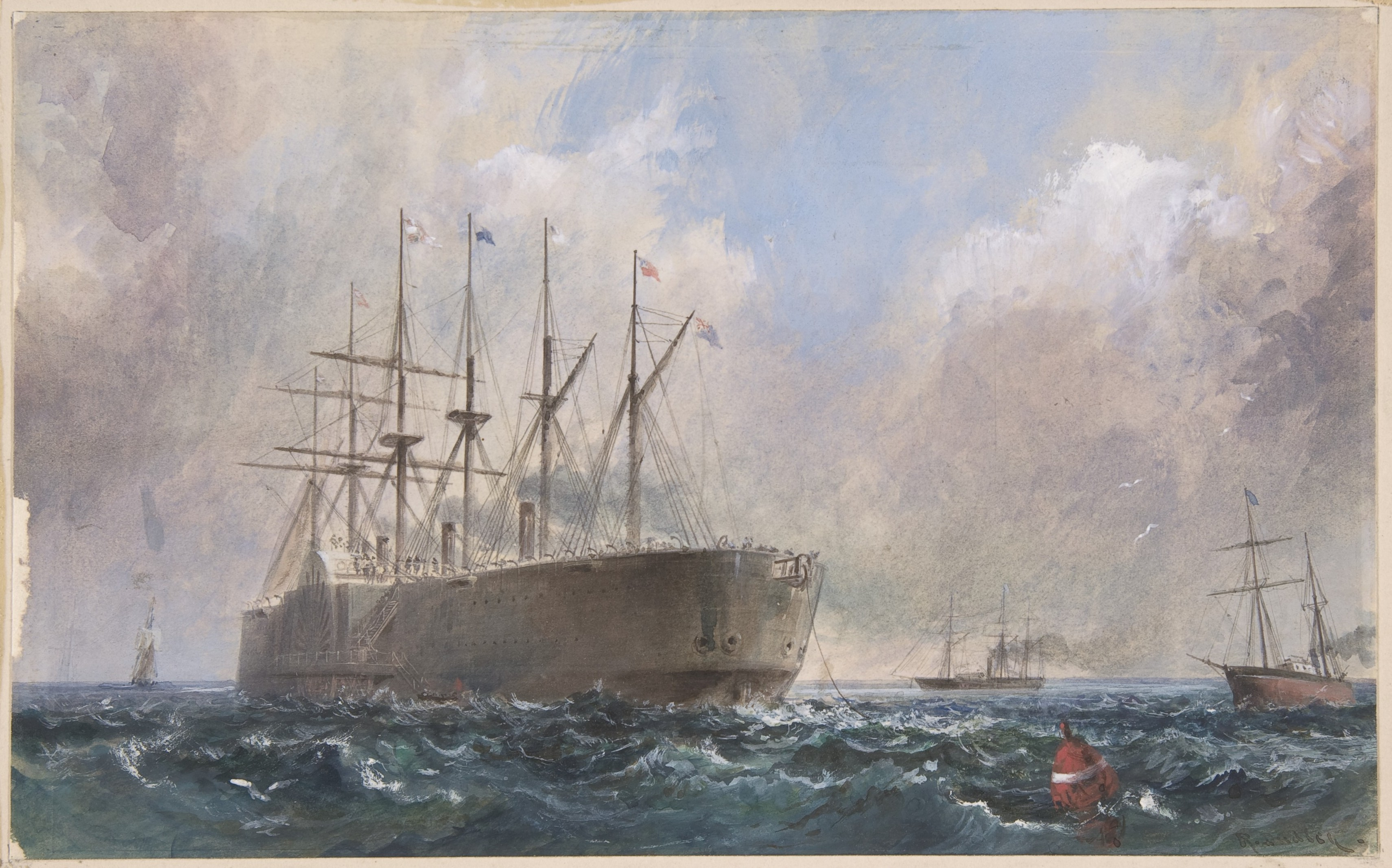
Telegraph Cable Fleet at Sea by Robert Charles Dudley, with the SS Great Eastern in the centre

The Great Eastern did not see commercial success; the original idea for her to service Australia could not be financed, and so she was given transatlantic routes already served by more efficient ships. In 1865, she eventually found purpose as an oceanic telegraph cable-layer. Under Captain Sir James Anderson, the Great Eastern played a significant role in laying the first lasting transatlantic telegraph cable, which enabled telecommunication between Europe and North America. Brunel's right-hand man at the GWR, Daniel Gooch, contributed significantly to this project, for which he was awarded a baronetcy in 1865.

She remained the largest ship built until the start of the 20th century, when she was surpassed in size by the RMS Lusitania. The ship has been portrayed as a white elephant, but it has been argued by David P. Billington that in this case, Brunel's failure was principally one of economics—his ships were simply years ahead of their time. His vision and engineering innovations made the building of large-scale, propeller-driven, all-metal steamships a practical reality, but the prevailing economic and industrial conditions meant that it would be several decades before transoceanic steamship travel emerged as a viable industry.

== Crimean War ==
In 1854 and 1855, during the Crimean War, Brunel presented the Admiralty with designs for floating gun batteries, which could be partially concealed in water, with the encouragement of John Fox Burgoyne. These were intended as siege weapons for attacking Russian ports, in particular Kronstadt. However, these proposals were not taken up, confirming Brunel's opinion of the Admiralty as being opposed to novel ideas.

=== Renkioi Hospital ===
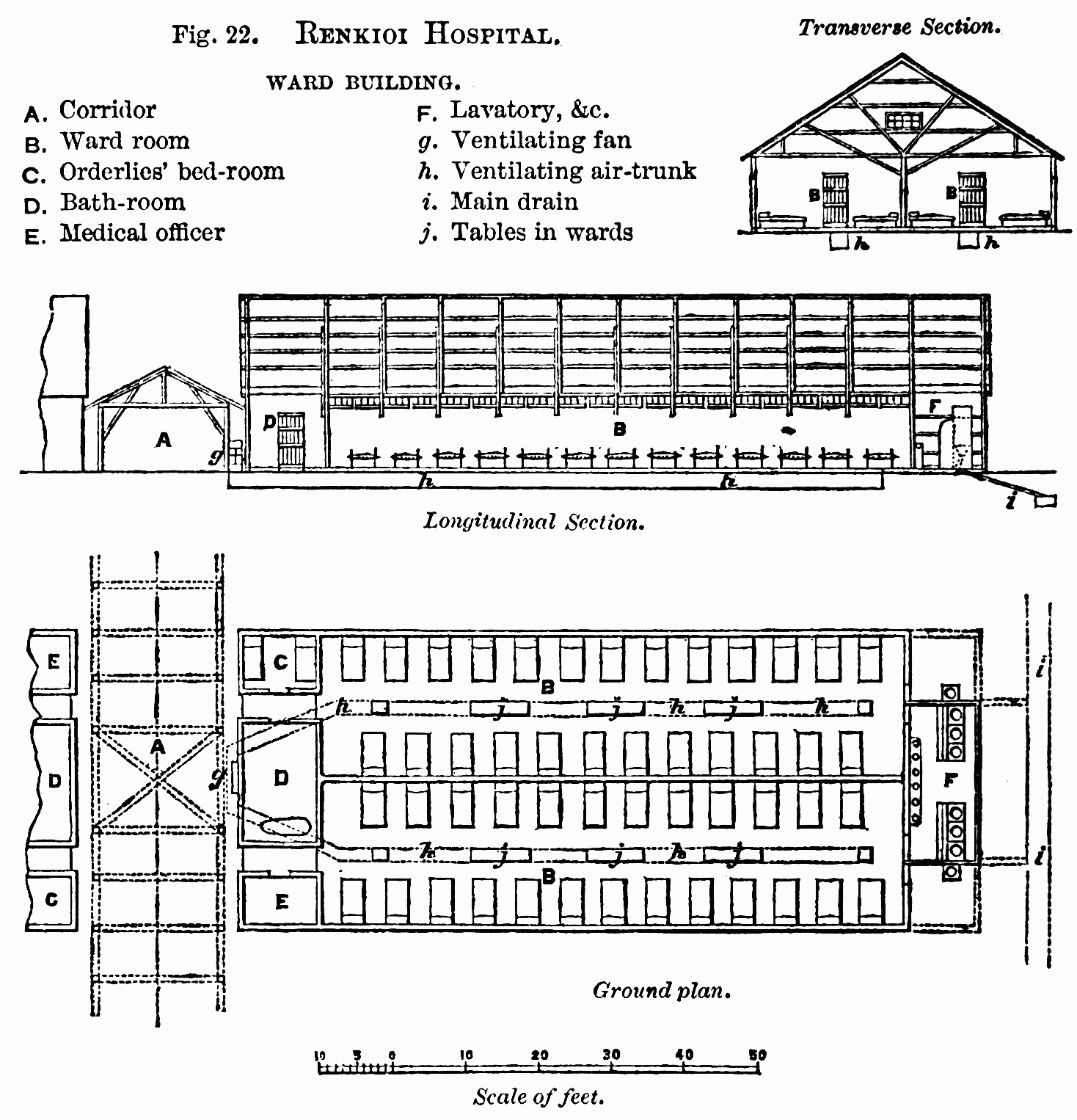
Brunel's plan for the Renkioi Hospital

Britain entered the Crimean War on 28 March 1854, and it quickly became apparent that not only were Britain's military tactics poor, but that their casualties were unnecessarily high, with five in every six deaths being from disease. Florence Nightingale was sent to Scutari, Turkey, where there were no proper hospitals, casualty transport system, or water supply; the British Army Hospital was hosted in an old barracks, where illnesses including cholera, dysentery, typhoid, and malaria ran rampant. Britain's failures in managing their wounded quickly became a national scandal after they were reported in The Times.

Benjamin Hawes, Brunel's brother-in-law (see § Personal life), wrote to him on 16 February 1855 to ask whether Brunel could build a mobile field hospital while implementing better hygiene standards. Hawes himself had been criticised by Nightingale for perceived inaction on the matter. At the time, he was working on the Great Eastern amongst other projects but accepted the task anyhow. Brunel presented his design to the War Office six days later, described by his biographer Annabel Gillings as "ingenious"—it featured 1000 beds, a ventilation system for hygiene, flushing toilets, and could be entirely built in England before being sent to the war zone for quick construction. The design even allowed for the temperature inside to be controlled.

In only five months, he and his team had designed, constructed, shipped, and assembled the pre-fabricated wood and canvas buildings, providing them with advice on transportation and positioning of the facilities. Brunel's field hospital was first assembled at Renkioi in the Dardanelles, and was assembled and ready for patients by 12 July 1855; it was full by 4 December. Of the approximately 1,300 patients treated in the hospital, there were only 50 deaths; this fatality rate of 4% at the hospital was less than a tenth of the fatality rate at the original hospital in Scutari. Nightingale referred to them as "those magnificent huts".

== Personal life ==
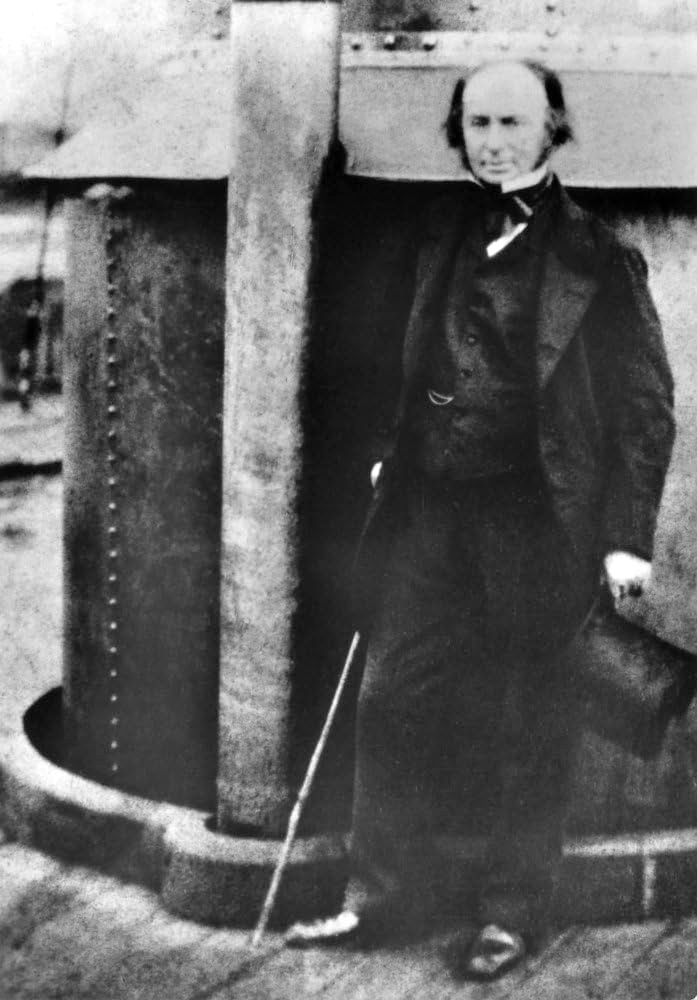
Brunel aboard the SS Great Eastern ten days before his death

In October 1827, Brunel began to write a personal diary, on top of the private diary and Thames Tunnel diary he already had, which he kept locked away to avoid intrusion. His personal diary is revealing of both a lack of self-confidence and self-satisfaction with the state of his career. He also discusses his thoughts for the future in great detail, stating that "indeed a bachelor life is luxurious", but that "on the other hand, in sickness or in disappointment how delightfull [sic] to have a companion whose sympathy one is sure of".

He was closely related to the Institution of Civil Engineers: he became an associate member in January 1829, a full member in 1837, was elected to its council in 1845, and was its Vice-President from 1850 until his death. On 10 June 1830, he was elected a Fellow of the Royal Society. Brunel's eldest sister Sophia married Benjamin Hawes, who would later serve in parliament as a Liberal politician; he and Brunel became close friends in spite of Brunel's disinterest in politics.

On 3 April 1843, while performing a conjuring trick for the amusement of his children, a half-sovereign coin which he had placed in his mouth became lodged in his windpipe. (Note: It is unclear whether the coin was actually swallowed or inhaled by Brunel, but it became stuck in his windpipe nonetheless.) A special pair of forceps failed to remove it, as did a machine devised by Brunel to shake it loose. At the suggestion of his father, Brunel was strapped to a board and turned upside-down, and the coin was jerked free. He recuperated at Teignmouth, and his enjoyment of the area influenced his eventual choice of location for his country estate.

In the autumn of 1847, he purchased land in Watcombe in Devon, with the intent to build himself a country house; this would later become Brunel Manor. In comparison to the stress of his major engineering projects, working on the estate became what his brother-in-law John Horsley called his "chief delight". He commissioned William Burn to design the house and gardens; having a country home of this type had been a great dream of his youth. Brunel himself took great interest in the house and gardens and contributed to their designs, showing the closest attention to detail towards trees, whose growth and arrangement he would study to ensure the resulting estate was perfect. He died before the house or gardens were finished – only the foundations of the house had been completed by his death. Brunel did not leave his family enough money to finish the estate, and so they sold it off.

=== Marriage and issue ===
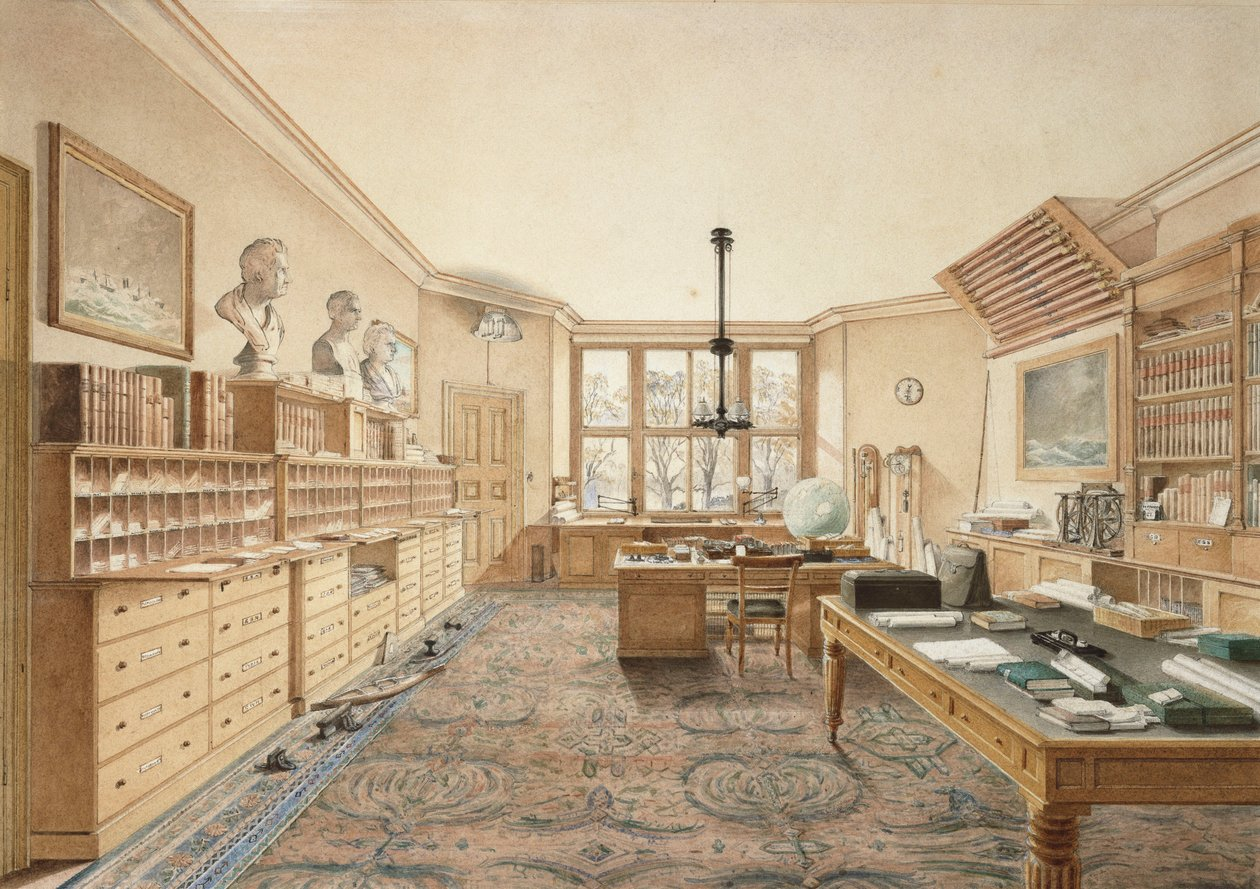
Brunel's office at 18 Duke Street, overlooking St James's Park

It was through Brunel's friendship with Benjamin Hawes that Brunel met his future wife, Mary Elizabeth Horsley, in summer 1832, whose family was accomplished in music and art; her father was composer and organist William Horsley, and her brother was John Callcott Horsley. John Horsley later praised Brunel's artistry, writing that he was "naturally imbued with artistic taste and perception of a very high order" and that he "had a remarkably accurate eye for proportion, as well as taste for form".

Isambard and Mary grew closer, and in May 1836, he proposed to her during a walk with her family on Holland Lane, London. The couple married on 5 July 1836 in St Mary Abbots, Kensington, before taking a honeymoon in North Wales and the West Country, and they established a home at 18 Duke Street, Westminster, overlooking St James' Park. (Note: The building is now part of Government Offices Great George Street on the modern Horse Guards Road.) The pair would live here until both of their deaths. Brunel's biographer Annabel Gillings comments that in contrast to Brunel's parents' intense, unfailing love, the partnership between Isambard and Mary was much more pragmatic and elegant. Isambard and Mary's children from their marriage were:

- Isambard Brunel, born 18 May 1837. Born with unequal leg length, which Mary Kingdom Brunel refused to have corrected, he went on to become the chancellor of the Diocese of Ely.
- Henry Marc Brunel, born in 1842. Henry went on to become an engineer himself, with his work including Tower Bridge.
- Florence James née Brunel, born c. 1847. It was only through her marriage to Arthur James, a master at Eton College, that the family line was continued.

=== Death ===
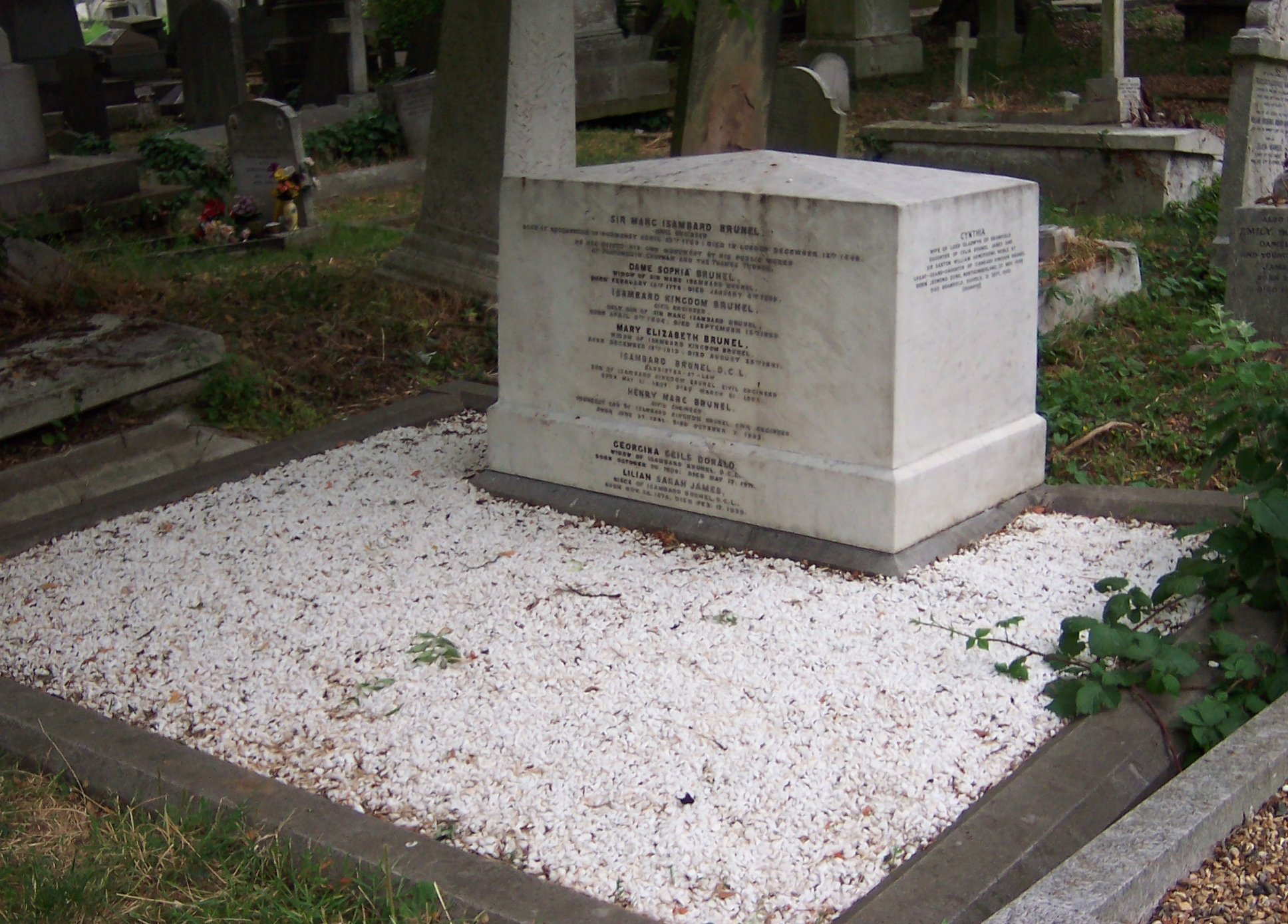
The Brunel family grave, Kensal Green Cemetery, London

Brunel was a heavy smoker, and Richard Bright diagnosed him with nephritis, to whose alternative name Bright's disease he was eponymous; this condition could lead to kidney failure if not treated, and Bright sent him to Egypt to recover there in the preferable climate, to which he left in December 1858 and returned in May 1859. By this point, he was ill enough that he could not stand, and in order to inspect the newly completed Royal Albert Bridge he was taken across seated on a train. He also missed the banquet aboard the SS Great Eastern on 8 August as he was too ill to attend, but did inspect the ship on 5 September. It was during this inspection that the last photo of a by-then-frail Brunel was taken.

Two hours later, Brunel suffered a stroke and was taken back to his home. On the evening of 8 September, he wrote his last letter, which asked for the GWR workers at Swindon Works to be given a day off to go and watch the SS Great Eastern. Four days later, on 9 September, he was informed of the accident on the Great Eastern and that it had killed five men. He did not survive long enough to hear the results of the inquest: at 10:30 pm on 15 September 1859, he died at his home in Duke Street, Westminster, aged 53. On 20 September, he was buried in Kensal Green Cemetery, alongside his father; the pair had designed the cemetery together in the 1820s. Brunel left his family an inheritance of £89,000 (equivalent to £9,670,000 in 2025), a much more modest sum than his railway contemporaries. Many mourned Brunel's passing, in spite of and because of his business ventures; an obituary in The Morning Chronicle noted:

Brunel was the right man for the nation, but unfortunately, he was not the right man for the shareholders. They must stoop who must gather gold, and Brunel could never stoop. The history of invention records no instance of grand novelties so boldly imagined and so successfully carried out by the same individual.

— the Morning Chronicle, 1859

== Legacy ==
In a public poll conducted by the BBC in 2002 to select the 100 Greatest Britons, Brunel was placed second, behind Winston Churchill. Brunel is celebrated by his biographers: Hereward Philip Spratt describes him in Nature as "one of the most ingenious and prolific figures in engineering history", and "one of the 19th-century engineering giants". In his book Isambard Kingdom Brunel, L. T. C. Rolt describes him as "one of the greatest figures of the Industrial Revolution, [who] changed the face of the English landscape with his ground-breaking designs and ingenious constructions". His entry by Robert Harrison in the Dictionary of National Biography describes his character as "universally esteemed", and that "he was a profound student of engineering science, and possessed, besides big mathematical knowledge and readiness in applying it, great natural mechanical skill". Annabel Gillings writes that Brunel "would become almost synonymous with engineering" and that "he was perhaps the most eminent Victorian engineer", claiming that "his work altered the lives of almost every person in Britain, and millions abroad". Dr Steven Brindle calls him "one of the most inspiring and compelling figures of the nineteenth century" and the "quintessence of the inventive, creative, and pioneering spirit of Victorian Britain".

Brunel's life and works have been depicted in numerous books, films and television programs. The 2003 book and BBC TV series Seven Wonders of the Industrial World included a dramatisation of the building of the Great Eastern. Brunel was the subject of Great, a 1975 animated film directed by Bob Godfrey. It won the Academy Award for Best Animated Short Film at the 48th Academy Awards in March 1976. At the 2012 Summer Olympics opening ceremony, Brunel was portrayed by Kenneth Branagh in a segment showing the Industrial Revolution. Brunel is a central character in Howard Rodman's novel The Great Eastern, published in 2019 by Melville House Publishing. A fictionalised version of Brunel is a key figure in the construction of Even Greater London in the alternate-history comedy podcast Victoriocity.

=== Memorials ===
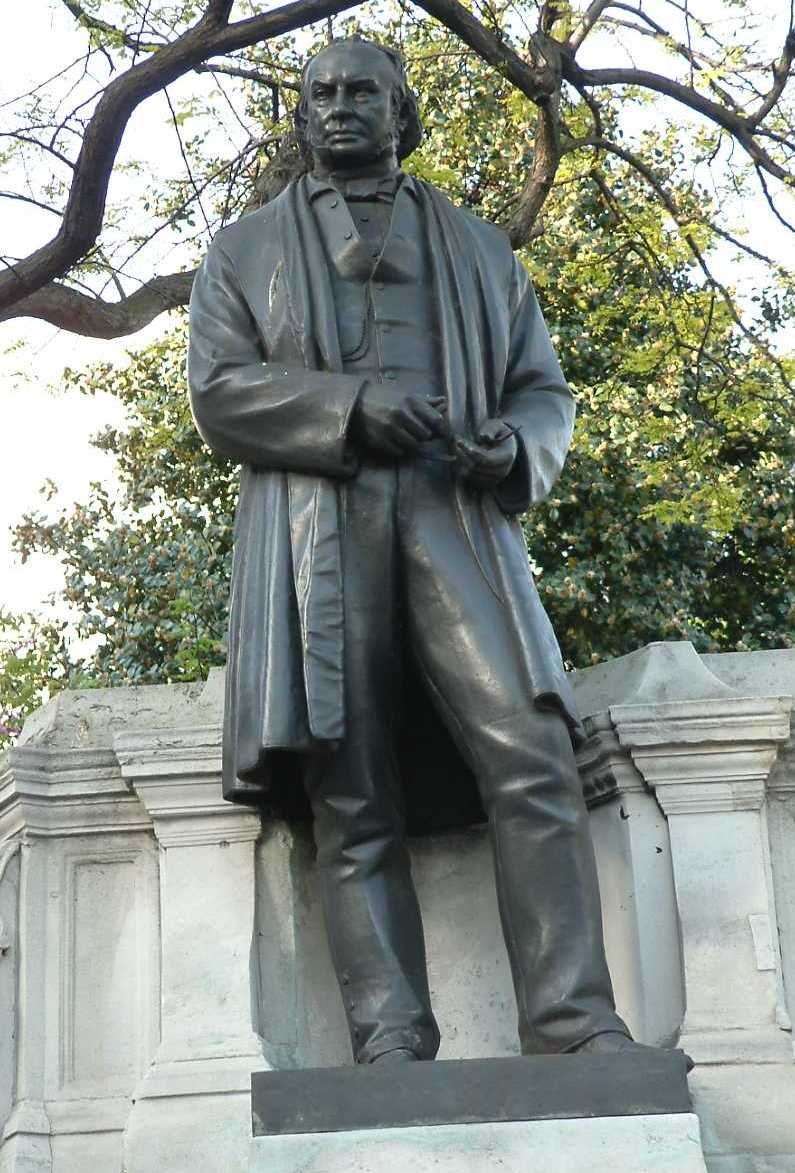
Bronze statue of Brunel on the Victoria Embankment in London

A celebrated engineer in his era, Brunel remains revered today, as evidenced by numerous monuments to him. In London, there is a statue of Brunel on the Victoria Embankment, and further statues at Brunel University and Paddington station. Other statues are in Bristol, Plymouth, Swindon, Milford Haven and Saltash. A statue in Neyland in Pembrokeshire in Wales was stolen in August 2010. Shortly after his death, he was commemorated at Westminster Abbey in a window on the south side of the nave, which was requested by his family and designed by Richard Norman Shaw.

Contemporary locations bear Brunel's name, such as Brunel University in London, shopping centres in Swindon and also Bletchley, Milton Keynes, and a collection of streets in Exeter: Isambard Terrace, Kingdom Mews, and Brunel Close. A road, car park, and school in his home city of Portsmouth are also named in his honour, along with one of the city's largest public houses. There is an engineering lab building at the University of Plymouth named in his honour.

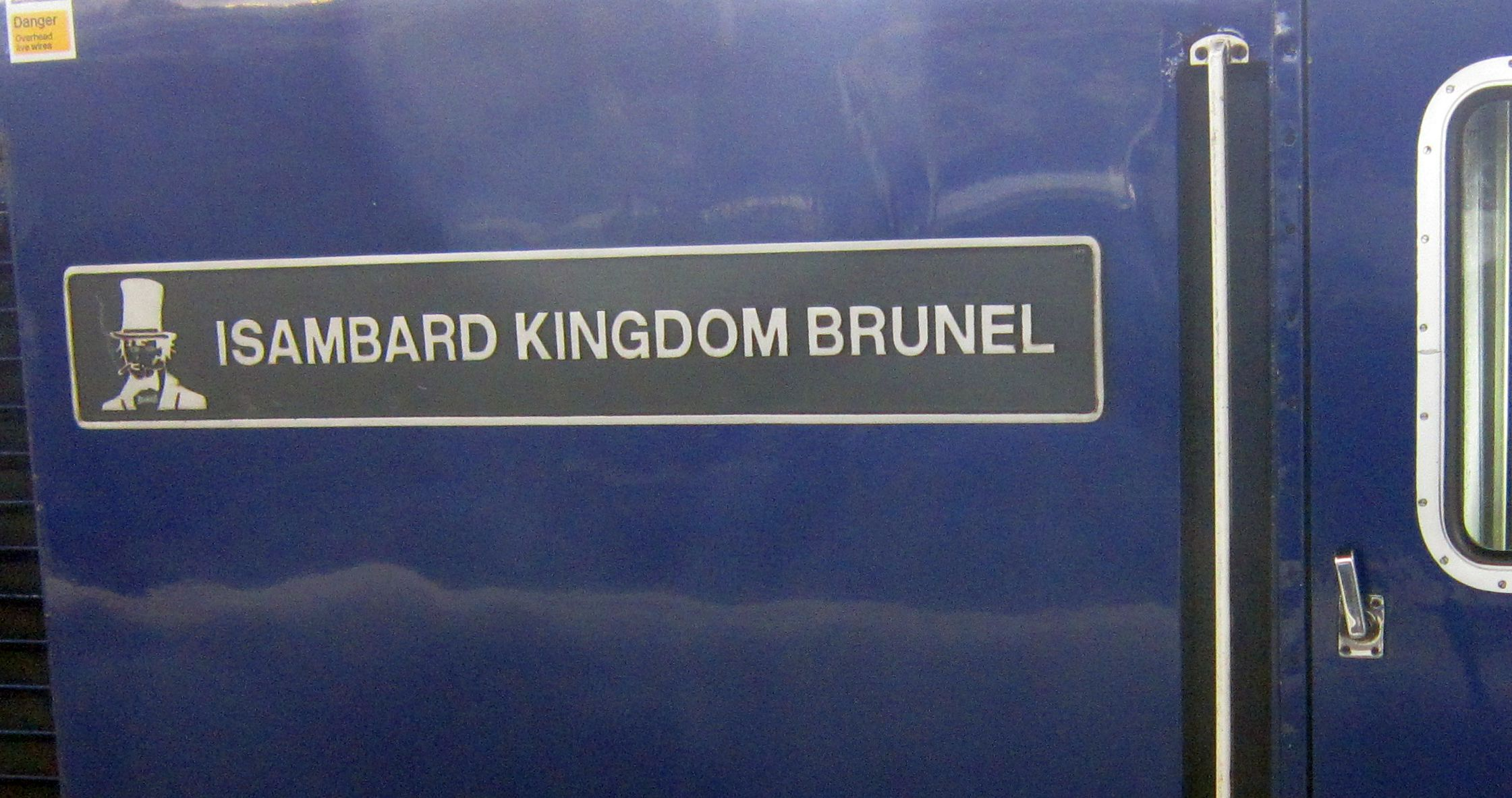
The power car of First Great Western 43003 Isambard Kingdom Brunel (Note: The nameplate was made in 2007, removed in 2018, and is now displayed in the National Railway Museum. Great Western Railway withdrew their final HST services in 2025.)

GWR Castle Class steam locomotive no. 5069 was named Isambard Kingdom Brunel, and BR Western Region class 47 diesel locomotive no. D1662 (later 47484) was also named for him. The 21st-century train operating company Great Western Railway named one of its Class 43s (number 43003) Isambard Kingdom Brunel in 2007.

The words I.K. Brunel Engineer 1859 were added above both portals of the Royal Albert Bridge shortly after his death, which were then partly obscured by maintenance access ladders but were revealed again by Network Rail in 2006 to honour his bicentenary. Two Tunnel Boring Machines (TBMs) used to construct Crossrail in London from 2013 were named for Brunel's wife Mary and his mother Sophia.

There were various celebrations for the bicentenary in 2006 of Brunel's birth. The Royal Mint struck two £2 coins to "celebrate the 200th anniversary of Isambard Kingdom Brunel and his achievements"; the first depicts Brunel with a section of the Royal Albert Bridge, and the second shows the roof of Paddington Station. In the same year the Post Office issued a set of six wide commemorative stamps (SG 2607–2612) showing the Royal Albert Bridge, the Box Tunnel, Paddington Station, the Great Eastern, the Clifton Suspension Bridge, and the Maidenhead Railway Bridge.

=== Railway legacy ===
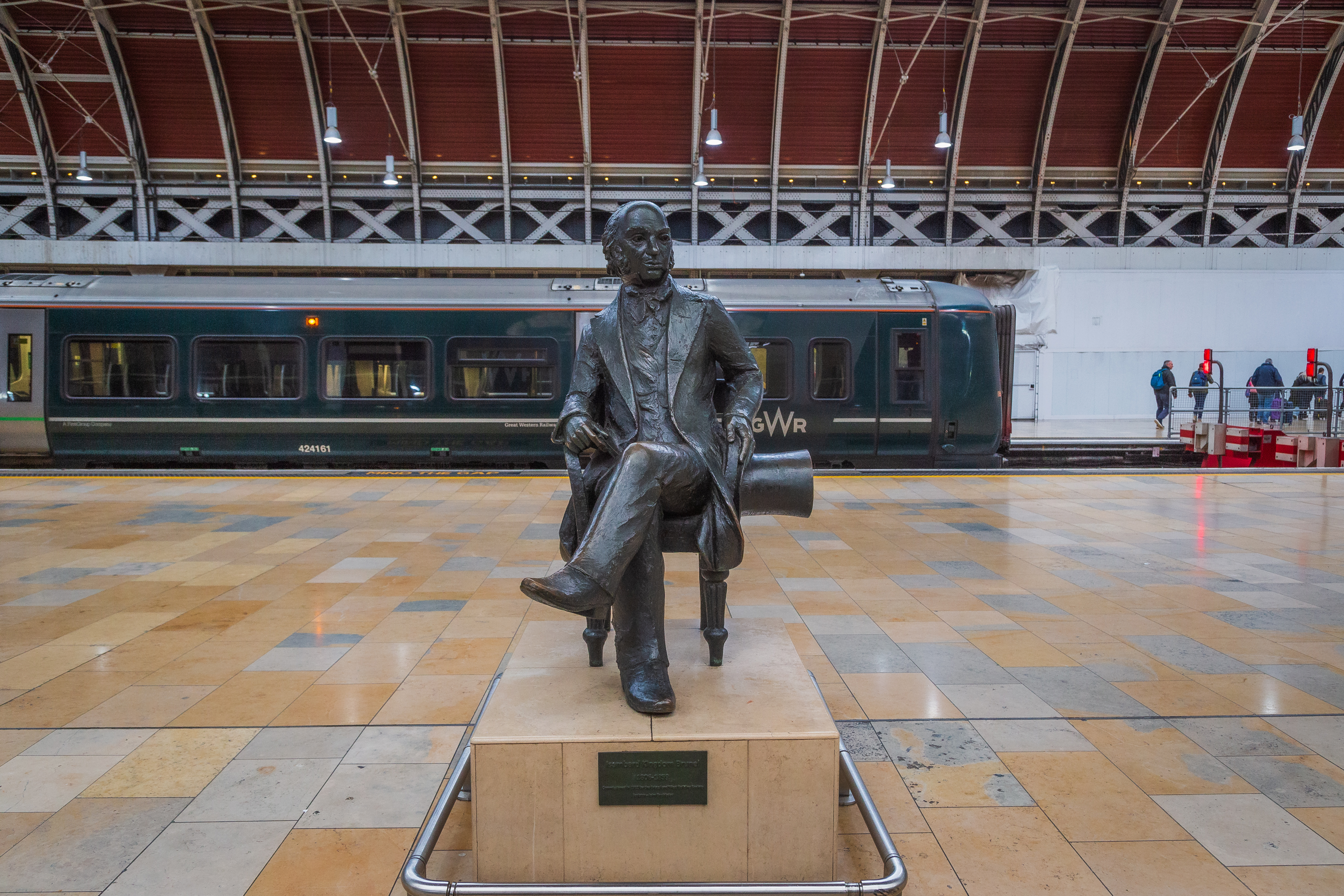
Statue of Brunel at London Paddington station, the London terminus of the Great Western Railway

At the original Welsh terminus of the GWR at Neyland, sections of the broad gauge rails are used as handrails at the quayside, and information boards there depict various aspects of Brunel's life. There is also a larger-than-life bronze statue of him holding a steamship in one hand and a locomotive in the other. The statue was replaced after the original was stolen.

Brunel is credited with turning the town of Swindon into one of the fastest-growing towns in Europe during the 19th century. Brunel's choice to locate the GWR locomotive sheds there caused a need for housing for the workers, which in turn gave Brunel the impetus to build hospitals, churches and housing estates in what is known today as the 'Railway Village'. According to some sources, Brunel's addition of a Mechanics Institute for recreation and hospitals and clinics for his workers gave Aneurin Bevan the basis for the creation of the National Health Service. The Swindon Steam Railway Museum has many artefacts from Brunel's time on the GWR. The Didcot Railway Centre has a reconstructed segment of 7 ft 1/4 in (2,140 mm) track as designed by Brunel and working steam locomotives in the same gauge, as well as a preserved section of his atmospheric railway.

Many of Brunel's bridges are still in use. Brunel's first engineering project, the Thames Tunnel, is now part of the London Overground network. The Brunel Engine House at Rotherhithe, which once housed the steam engines that powered the tunnel pumps, now houses the Brunel Museum dedicated to the work and lives of Marc Isambard and Isambard Kingdom Brunel. Many of Brunel's original papers and designs are now held in the Brunel Institute alongside the SS Great Britain in Bristol, and are freely available for researchers and visitors. Several of Brunel's bridges over the GWR were proposed for demolition in plans for the line's electrification in the early years of the 21st century due to clearance issues, but Buckinghamshire County Council negotiated to have further options pursued to save the historic bridges along the line.

== See also ==
- Lindsey House – Brunel's childhood home
- Robert Stephenson – Brunel's contemporary and close friend

== Sources ==
- Beckett, Derrick (2006). Brunel's Britain. David & Charles. ISBN 978-0-7153-2360-1.
- Billington, David P (1985). The Tower and the Bridge: The New Art of Structural Engineering. Princeton University Press. ISBN 978-0-691-02393-9.
- Binding, John (1993). Brunel's Cornish Viaducts. Penryn, Cornwall: Atlantic Transport Publishers. ISBN 0-906899-56-7.
- Brindle, Steven (2005). Brunel: The Man Who Built the World. Weidenfeld & Nicolson. ISBN 978-0-297-84408-2.
- Bryan, Tim (1999). Brunel: The Great Engineer. Ian Allan. ISBN 0711026866.
- Buchanan, R. Angus (2006). Brunel: the life and times of Isambard Kingdom Brunel. Hambledon & London. ISBN 978-1-85285-525-3.
- Buchanan, R. Angus (2026) [2004]. "Isambard Kingdom Brunel". Oxford Dictionary of National Biography (online ed.). Oxford University Press. doi:10.1093/ref:odnb/3773.
- Dumpleton, Bernard; Miller, Muriel (2002). Brunel's Three Ships. Intellect Books. ISBN 978-1-84150-800-9.
- Gillings, Annabel (2006). Brunel (Life & Times). Haus Publishing. ISBN 978-1-904950-44-8.
- Harrison, Robert (1886). "Brunel, Isambard Kingdom" . In Stephen, Leslie (ed.). Dictionary of National Biography. Vol. 07. London: Smith, Elder & Co.
- Jones, Robin (2020) [2006]. Isambard Kingdom Brunel. Approved by the National Railway Museum. Pen & Sword. ISBN 978-1526783691.
- MacDermot, Edward T. (1927). History of the Great Western Railway. Vol. I, 1833–1863 (1st ed.). Great Western Railway. OCLC 1274459763.
- MacDermot, Edward T. (1931). History of the Great Western Railway. Vol. II, 1863–1921 (1st ed.). Great Western Railway. OCLC 650383039.
- Rolt, L.T.C. (1989) [1957]. Isambard Kingdom Brunel. Prentice Hall Press. ISBN 978-0-582-10744-1.
- Timbs, John (1860). Stories of inventors and discoverers in science and the useful arts. London: Kent and Co. OCLC 1349834.
- Tudor, Geoffrey (2007). Brunel's Hidden Kingdom. Paignton: Creative Media Publishing. ISBN 978-0954607128.
