= St Andrew Holborn (church) =

Coordinates: 51°31′2.10″N 0°6′24.14″W

St Andrew, Holborn
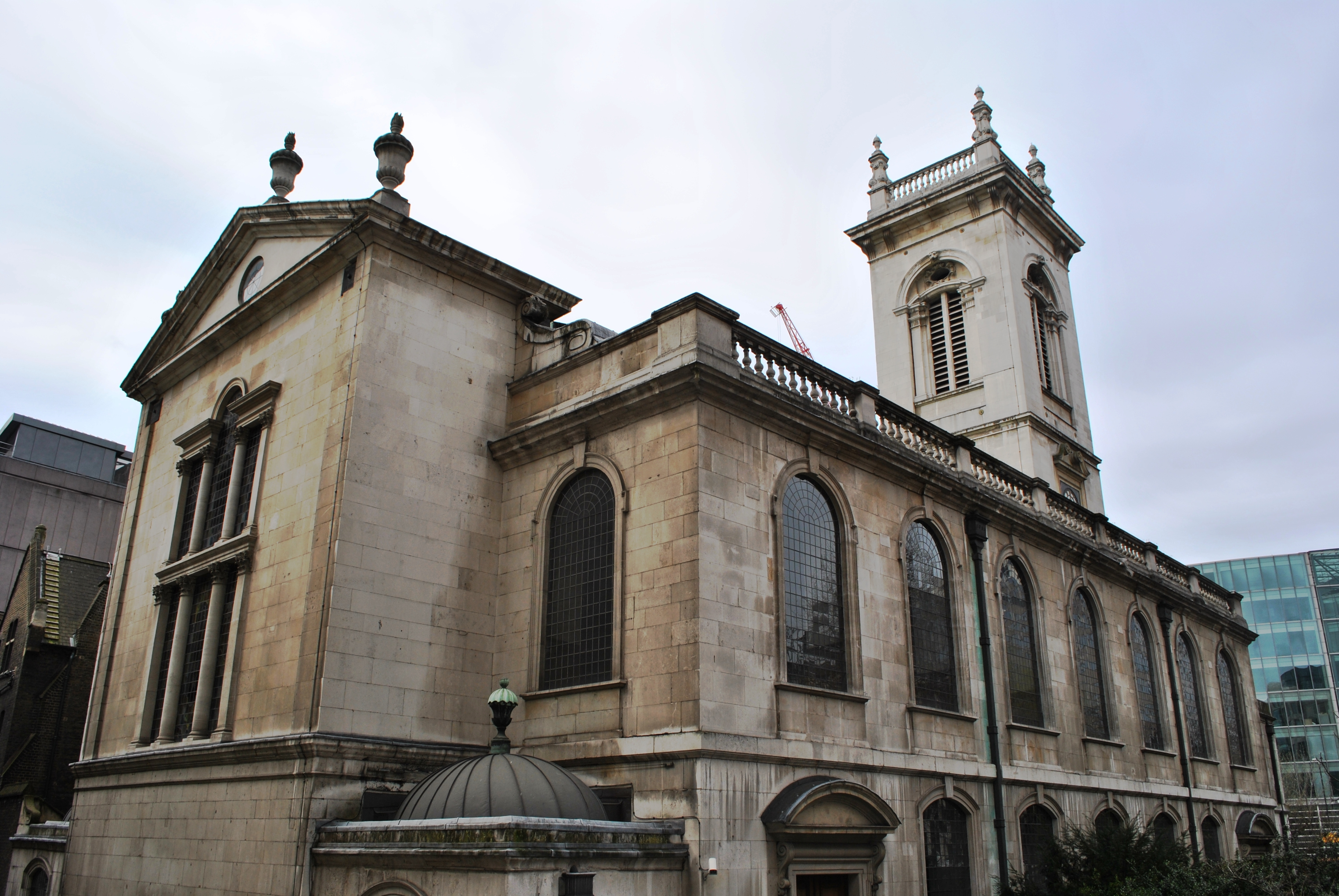

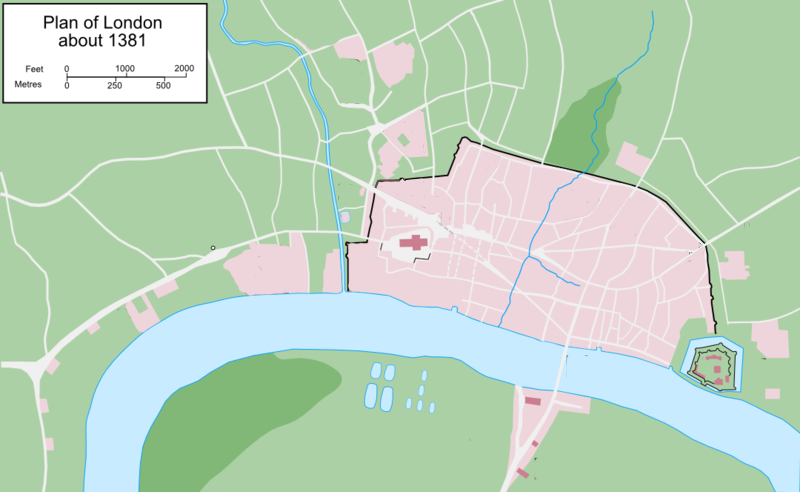
- Location within City of London Location within City of London in 1300
- OS grid reference: TQ 31470 81518
- Location: London, EC4
- Country: England
- Language: English
- Denomination: Church of England
- Churchmanship: Traditional Catholic
- Website: standrewholborn.org.uk

History
- Former name(s): St Andrew Holburnestrate, St Andrew de Holeburn
- Status: Active
- Founded: 10th century AD or earlier
- Dedication: Saint Andrew

Architecture
- Functional status: Guild Church
- Heritage designation: Grade I listed
- Designated: 4 January 1950
- Architect: Sir Christopher Wren
- Style: English Baroque

Administration
- Diocese: Diocese of London
- Archdeaconry: Archdeaconry of London
- Deanery: The City
- Parish: St Andrew Holborn

Clergy
- Bishop: Bishop of Fulham (PEV)
- Vicar(s): The Rt Rev Jonathan Baker, Guild Vicar; The Rev James Wilkinson, Associate Vicar

The Church of St Andrew, Holborn, is a Church of England church on the northwestern edge of the City of London, on Holborn within the Ward of Farringdon Without.

== History ==
=== Roman and medieval ===
Roman pottery was found on the site during 2001/02 excavations in the crypt. However, the first written record of the church itself is dated as 951 (DCCCCLI) in a charter of Westminster Abbey, referring to it as the "old wooden church", on top of the hill above the River Fleet. The Charter's authenticity has been called into question because the date is not within the reign of King Edgar (r. 959–975) who is granting it. It may be that this is simply a scribal error and that the date should be '959' (DCCCCLIX). A 'Master Gladwin', i.e. a priest, held it after the Norman Conquest and he assigned it to St Paul's Cathedral, but with the proviso that the advowson be granted at 12 pence a year to the Cluniac Order's, St Saviour's foundation of what was to become Bermondsey Abbey. This assignment dates between 1086 and 1089. In about 1200 a deed was witnessed by James, the Parson, Roger, his chaplain, Andrew, the Deacon and also Alexander his clerk. In 1280 one Simon de Gardino bequeathed funds towards the building of a belfry, it is assumed this would be stone and that there were due to be bells to be cast for it.

In the Early Middle Ages the church is referred to as St Andrew Holburnestrate and later simply as St Andrew de Holeburn.

In 1348, John Thavie, a local armourer, "left a considerable Estate towards the support of the fabric forever", a legacy which survived the English Reformation, was invested carefully through the centuries, and still provides for the church's current upkeep. In the 15th century, the wooden church was replaced by a medieval stone one. On 8 July 1563, during a severe storm, the steeple of the church was struck and badly damaged by lightning.

After being executed by hanging for the crime of serving at a Catholic Mass, Swithun Wells was buried in the churchyard on 10 December 1591.

=== 16th to 18th century ===
The medieval St Andrew's survived the 1666 Great Fire of London, saved by a last minute change in wind direction, but was already in a bad state of repair and so was rebuilt by Christopher Wren anyway. In what is his largest parish church, he rebuilt from the foundations (creating the present crypt) and gave the existing medieval stone tower (the only medieval part to survive) a marble cladding. Its rector from 1713 to 1724 was Henry Sacheverell, who is buried beneath the church's altar.

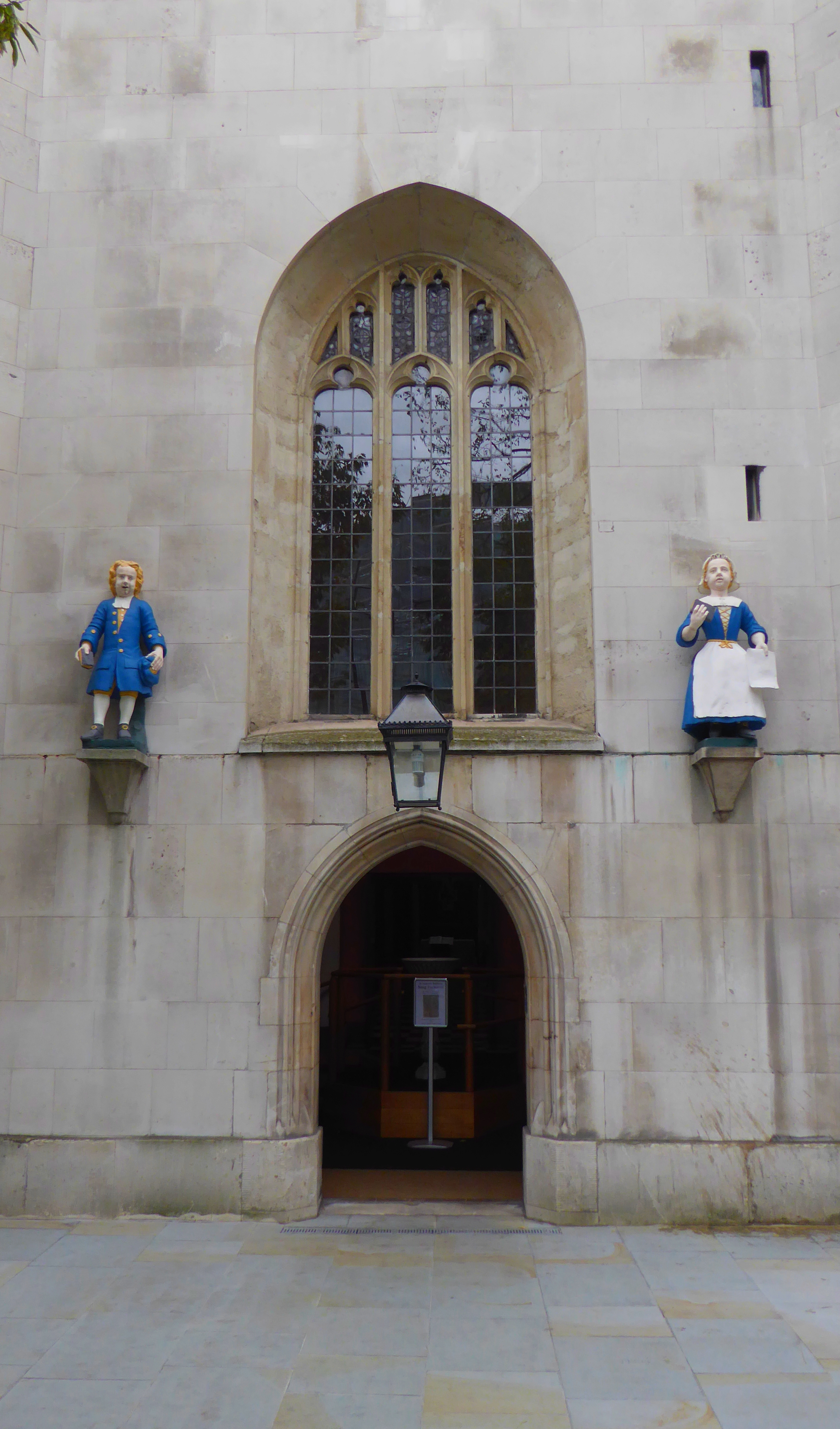
The same statues from the Foundling Hospital located in Hatton Garden are above the side door of St Andrew Holborn. Thomas Coram is buried here, his remains were translated from his foundation in the 1960s

In 1741, the philanthropic sea captain Thomas Coram set up the Foundling Hospital for abandoned children in a house in nearby Hatton Garden. The following year, the charity moved to new premises in Bloomsbury and remained there until 1935.

The church of St George the Martyr Holborn was built between 1703 and 1706, as a chapel of ease for the parish. It became a parish church in its own right in 1723.

In 1771, James Somerset was baptised here. He had been brought to England as a slave and his white Godparents later brought his case to court, resulting in a 1772 ruling that slavery was not legal in England.

On 1 November 1799, Marc Isambard Brunel married Sophia Kingdom at the church.

=== 19th century ===
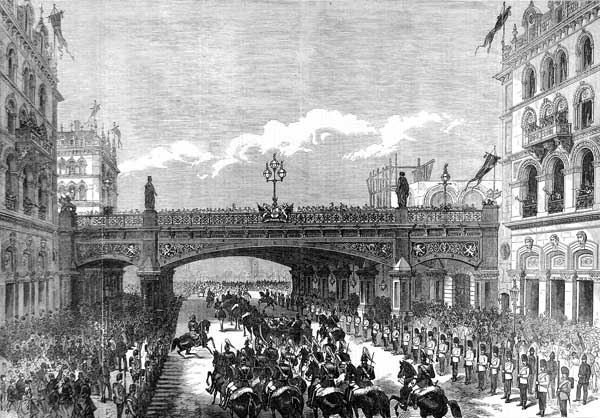
The opening of Holborn Viaduct, 1869

In 1808, writer William Hazlitt married Sarah Stoddart, with Charles Lamb as his best man, and Mary Lamb as a bridesmaid. The twelve-year-old Benjamin Disraeli, the future Prime Minister, was received into the Christian Church in 1817.

It was on the church's steps in 1828 that the surgeon William Marsden found a homeless girl suffering from hypothermia, and sought help for her from one of the nearby hospitals. However, none would take her in, and she died in Marsden's arms; the horror of the experience inspired him to establish the Royal Free Hospital for the poor and destitute. Today the hospital is located in Hampstead.

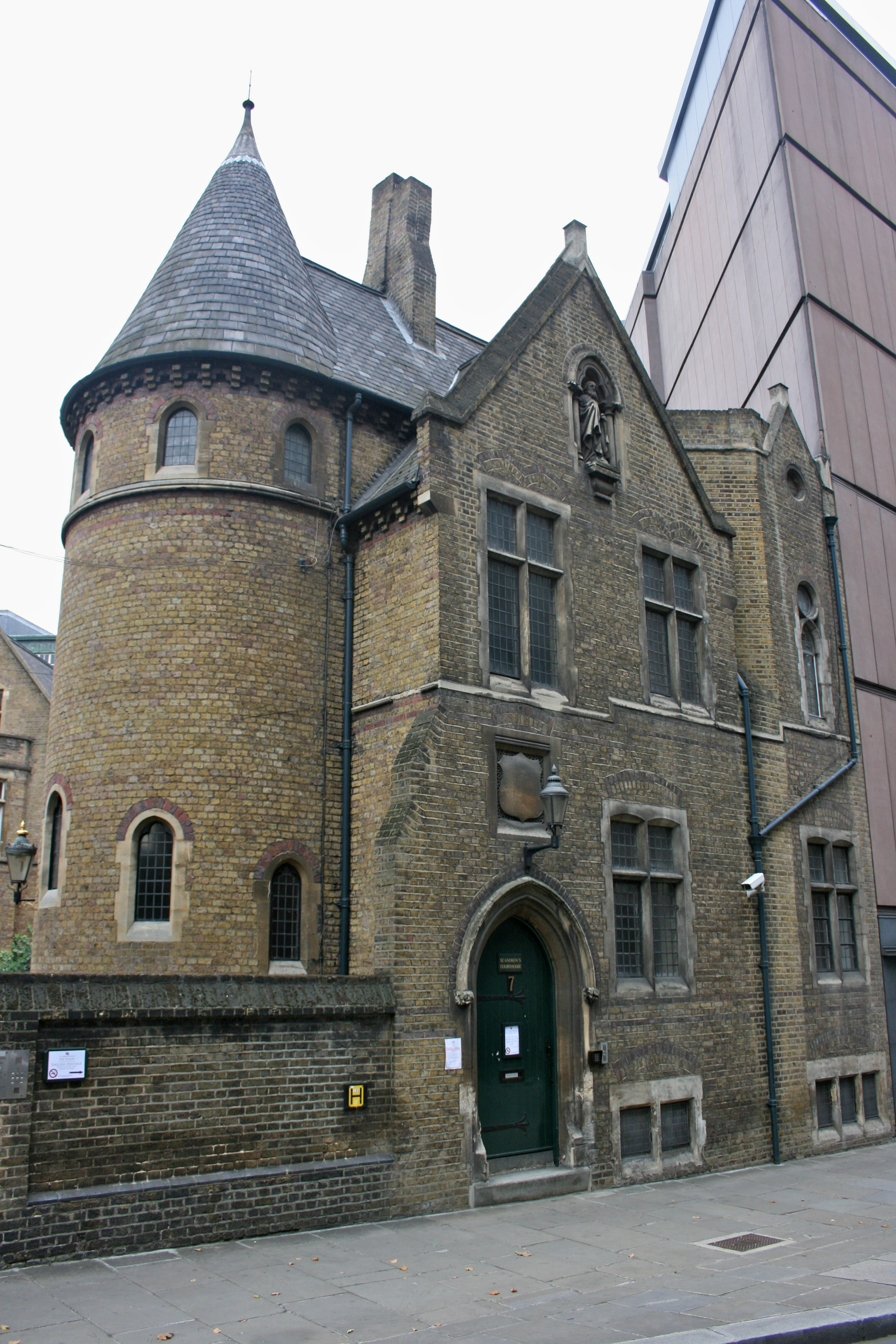
St Andrew's Court House

In the mid-19th century, the Holborn Valley Improvement Scheme bought up the church's North Churchyard. Many of the bodies were re-interred: some in the crypt, and others at the City of London Cemetery in Ilford (the latter also being the destination for the bodies from the crypt when it was cleared in 2002–2003) to make way for the Holborn Viaduct, linking Holborn with Newgate, which was opened by Queen Victoria in 1869.

As part of this improvement scheme the church received compensation to replace its assets, and the Gothic architect Samuel Sanders Teulon was commissioned to build a new rectory and courthouse on the south side of the church – this now operates as the offices for the foundation, the associated charities and the Archdeaconry of Hackney, as well as the rectory and the conference rooms. Teulon incorporated into the courtroom, the building's main room, a 17th-century fireplace. This was from the 'Quest Room' for the 'below Bars' part of the parish, i.e. that lies outside the city boundary, sited as part of a block of buildings in the middle of the main street. This block was removed as part of the Holborn Viaduct improvements and explains why Holborn is so wide at this point.

In Charles Dickens's Oliver Twist Bill Sykes looks up at this church's tower (an episode referenced by Iris Murdoch in Under the Net, though from where her character stands such a view is almost impossible). In Dickens' Bleak House, Mr Snagsby's deceased partner, Peffer, is buried in the churchyard of St Andrew's.

=== 20th century to present ===
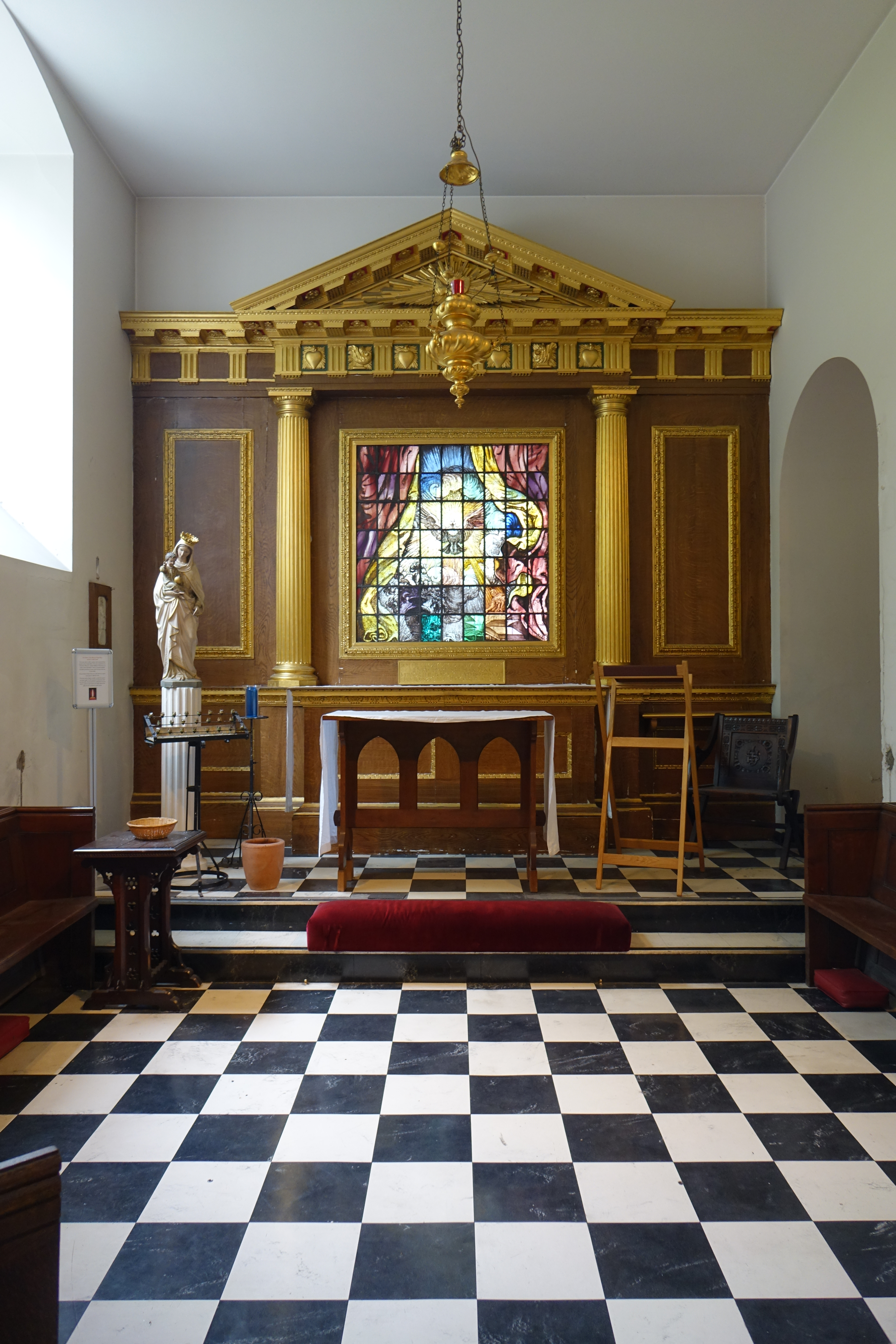
Stained glass by Brian Thomas

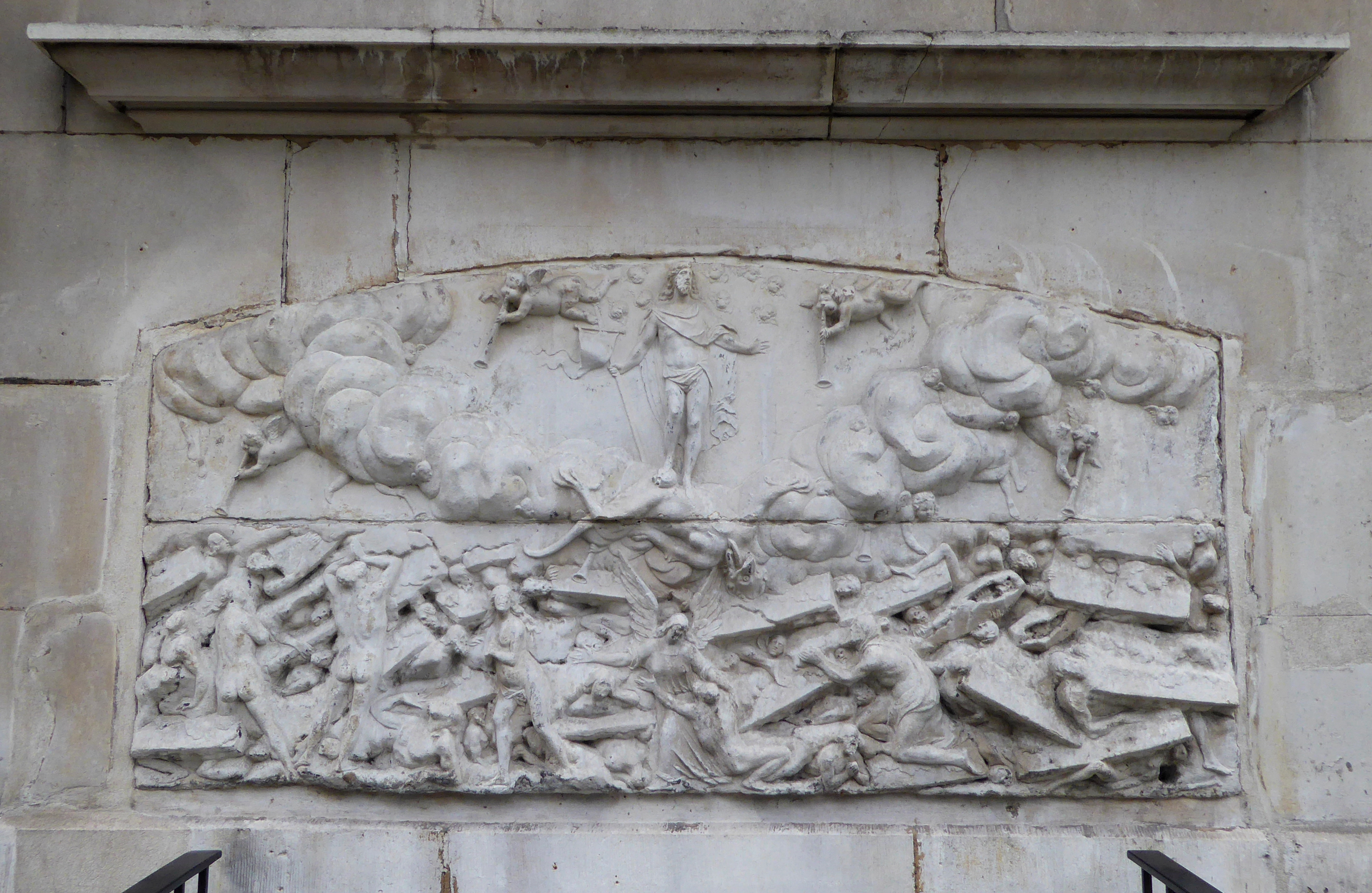
External sculpture

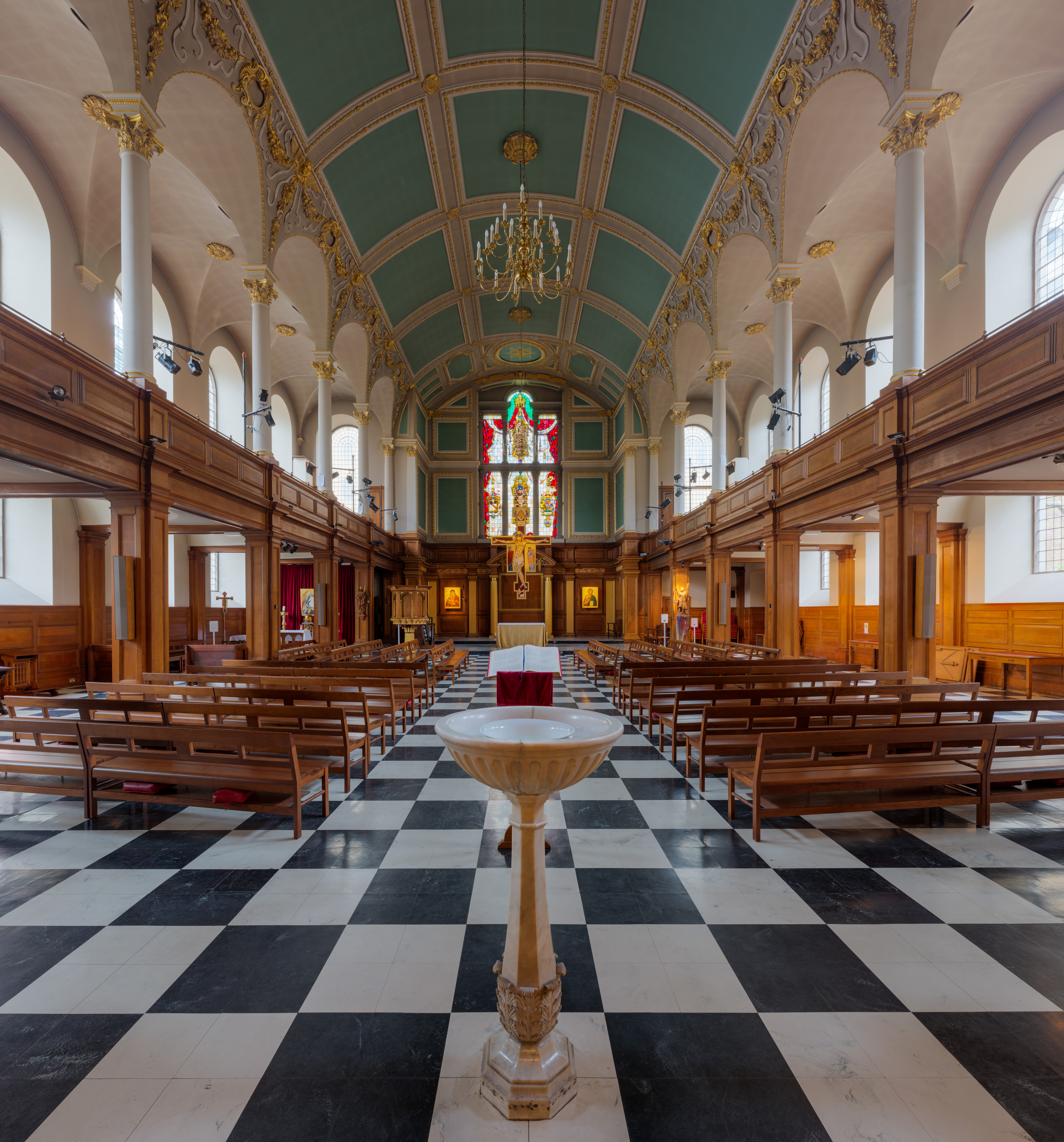
Interior of the church, facing east toward the altar

During the London Blitz, on the night of 7 May 1941, the church was bombed by German bombs and gutted, leaving only the exterior walls and tower. However, instead of demolition which sometimes occurred in similar cases, it was decided after a long delay that it would be restored "stone for stone and brick for brick" to Wren's original designs. The church was designated a Grade I listed building on 4 January 1950.

The church contains stained glass and a mural – depicting the Holy Spirit as a dove – by Brian Thomas.

In 1955, the Foundling Hospital, which had originally been founded in St Andrew's parish, sold its premises at Ashlyns School in Berkhamsted, Hertfordshire. It was decided to transfer a number of items from the Hospital chapel in Berkhamsted back to London, including the mortal remains of Thomas Coram, the Hospital founder, which were exhumed and placed in a tomb in St Andrew's. The casing of the organ, which had originally been given to the Foundling Hospital by George Frideric Handel, was also dismantled and installed in St Andrew's, along with the pulpit and the baptismal font.

The church re-opened in 1961 as a non-parochial Guild Church intended for serving the local working rather than resident community which had declined as had the City's population as a whole.

In January 2005 a new large icon was installed, made for the site by the Monastic Family Fraternity of Jesus in Vallechiara. The church runs a selection of recitals and lectures, as well as weekly services and evening concerts.

In August 2010, St Andrew Holborn's Icon Cross became motorised, allowing the large icon of Jesus on the Cross to be raised and lowered for services.

In September 2017 controversy occurred when a London Fashion Week show which took place at the church included runway models sporting satanic images and symbols.

=== Rectors of St Andrew Holborn ===
- 1439–1447† Gilbert Worthington
- 1447–1478† William Grene
- 1478–1531 Ralph Gartside
- ——
- 1584–1597 Richard Bancroft (Bishop of London 1597, Archbishop of Canterbury 1604)
- 1597–1611 John King (Dean of Christ Church, Oxford 1605, Bishop of London 1611)
- 1611–1624† Gregory Ducket (Librarian of Cambridge University)
- 1624–1662 John Hacket (Archdeacon of Bedford 1631, sequestered 1645, restored, Bishop of Lichfield and Coventry 1661)
- 1662–1664† James Lamb
- 1664–1665† John Taylor
- 1665–1689 Edward Stillingfleet (Dean of St Paul's 1678, Bishop of Worcester 1689)
- 1689–1691 John Moore (Bishop of Norwich 1691, Ely 1707)
- 1691–1713 Thomas Manningham (Dean of Windsor 1709, Bishop of Chichester 1709)
- 1713–1724† Henry Sacheverell
- 1724–1734† Geoffrey Barton (brother of Cutts Barton)
- 1734–1780† Cutts Barton (Dean of Bristol 1763)
- 1780–1806† Charles Barton (son of Cutts Barton)
- 1806–1815 John Luxmoore (Bishop of Bristol 1807, Hereford 1808, St Asaph 1815)
- 1815–1819† Thomas George Clare
- 1819–1838 Gilbert Beresford
- 1838–1850 John Travers Robinson
- 1850–1857 Jonathan James Toogood
- 1858–1899† Henry George Scawen Blunt
- 1899– —— Dacre Craven
- 1917–1937 Edwin Curtis Bedford
- 1938-1956 Joseph Russell Howden

† Rector died in post

== Organ ==
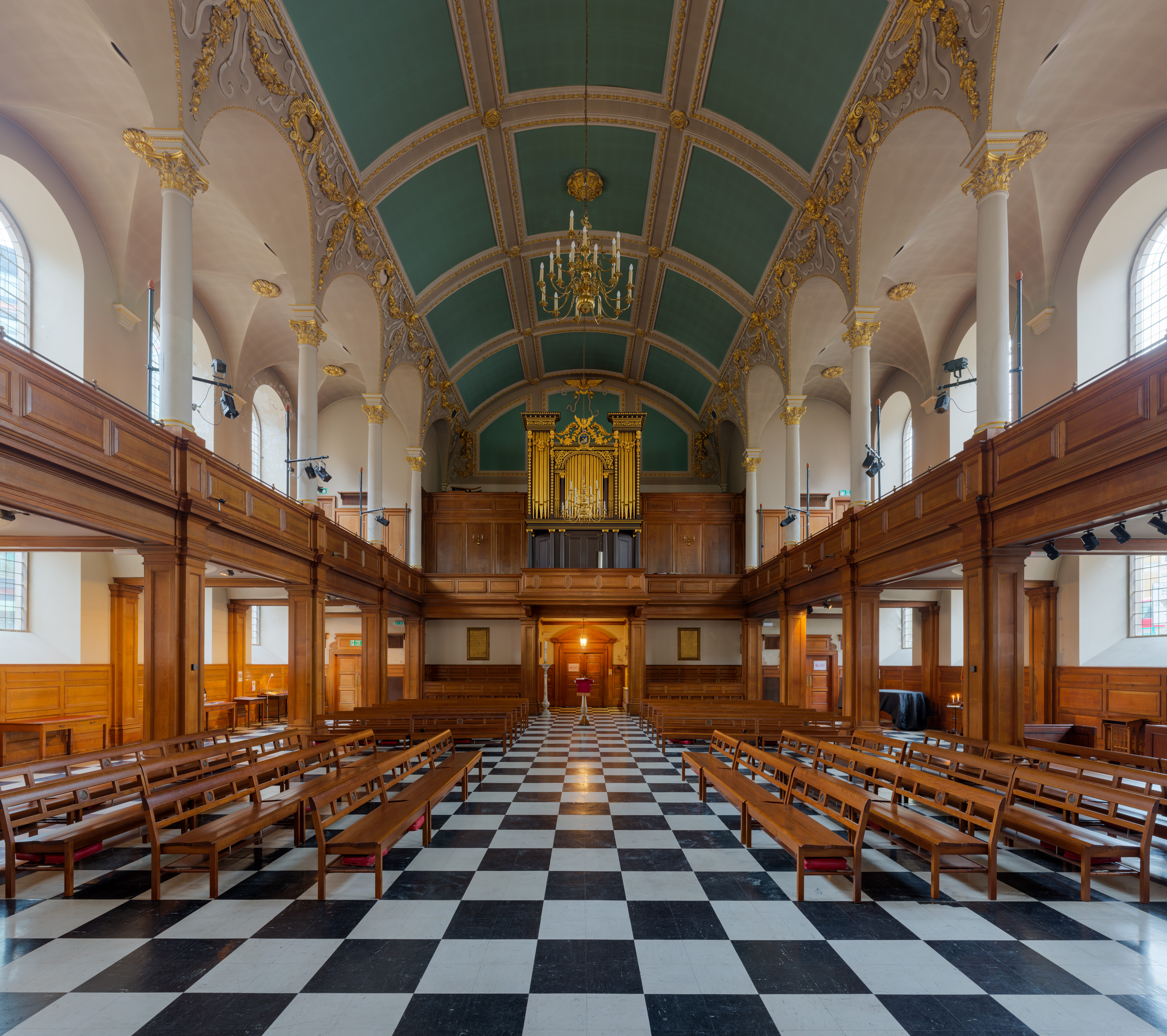
Interior of the church, facing west toward the organ

The organ in St Andrew's is a 20th-century instrument in an 18th-century casing. It was built by Mander Organs in 1989 and is mounted in the west gallery. The upper part of the organ casing incorporates the original casework from the 1750 organ built for the Foundling Hospital chapel in Bloomsbury to a design by Handel. In 1935 it was installed in Ashlyns School chapel in Berkhamsted before being dismantled and re-installed in St Andrew, Holborn.

=== Organists ===
- Daniel Purcell 1713–1717 (younger brother or possibly cousin of the composer Henry Purcell
- Maurice Greene 1717–1718
- John Isham 1718–1726
- John Stanley 1726–1786 (organist at St Andrew's from the age of 14, replaced Handel as a governor of the Foundling Hospital after Handel's death (thus continuing the tradition of performing the Messiah for the Hospital) and died near the church in Hatton Garden)
- James Evance 1786–1811
- John Grosvenor 1811–1814
- J. Reynolds c. 1828–1867
- James Higgs 1867–1895
- Harold Phillips 1896–1903
- F. G. M. Ogbourne 1903–1925 (formerly assistant organist of the Chapel Royal, (St James's Palace)
- W. Glanville Hopkins 1925–1942 (formerly organist of St Giles-without-Cripplegate, afterwards organist of St Mary Abbots, Kensington)
- Ida Maude Hopkins 1942–
- Stuart Hutchinson
- James McVinnie

== Notable interments ==
- Ralph Rokeby (died 1596)
- John Gerard (c. 1545–1612)
- Praise-God Barebone (c. 1598–1679)
- Swithun Wells (c. 1536–1591)
- William Stanton (1639–1705)
- Thomas Coram (c. 1668–1751)
- Sarah Pridden (c. 1692 – 1724)

== Notable weddings ==
- Marc Isambard Brunel and Sophia Kingdom (1799)
- William Hazlitt and Sarah Stoddart (1808)

== See also ==
- List of churches and cathedrals of London
- List of Christopher Wren churches in London
