= Thames Archway Company =

The Thames Archway Company was a company formed in 1805 to build the first tunnel under the Thames river in London.

The development of docks on both sides of the river around the Isle of Dogs indicated that a river crossing of some kind was needed. A tunnel from Rotherhithe to Limehouse was suggested in about 1803 in which the Northumbrian engineer Robert Vazie became involved. The Thames Tunnel (Wapping and Rotherhithe) Act 1805 established the Thames Archway Company "for making and maintaining an Archway or Archways under the River Thames... ". The aim was to build a through road "for the passage of Cattle and Carriages, or for Foot Passengers only" to form "uninterrupted Land Communication ... between the opposite Shores of the Counties of Surrey and Middlesex".

As a first step, a pilot tunnel or 'driftway' was to be bored, starting from a shaft to be sunk in Rotherhithe (i.e. from the south bank). The driftway was supposed to drain the surrounding bedrock and then be enlarged into a full, brick-arched tunnel which would accommodate two-way vehicular traffic. However, the firm strata anticipated were mostly sand and gravel with pockets of quicksand. After a year Vazie had only driven a shaft 12.8 metres (42 ft) deep and money was running out.

In 1807 the directors of the company brought in Richard Trevithick who agreed to take the driftway across the river for a success fee of £1,000. Employing Cornish miners to dig and a 30-horsepower steam engine to pump, he eventually succeeded in making the driftway 313 metres (1,027 ft) from the Rotherhithe shaft: he had tunnelled under the Thames, albeit only beyond the low-water mark. This was the first time that anyone had made a tunnel pass underneath the actual water of any river. However, it remained to complete the excavation under the high-water mark, and this Trevithick was unable to do, owing to breakthroughs of quicksand.

The failure of the Thames Archway project led engineers to conclude that "an underground tunnel is impracticable".

Between 1825 and 1843 Marc Isambard Brunel and his son Isambard Kingdom Brunel built the Thames Tunnel about half a mile (0.80 km) upstream. Money ran out and they were unable to build the approach roads needed for carriages to use it.
