= Thames Tunnel =

Tunnel crossing under the River Thames in London

Coordinates: 51°30′11″N 00°03′16″W

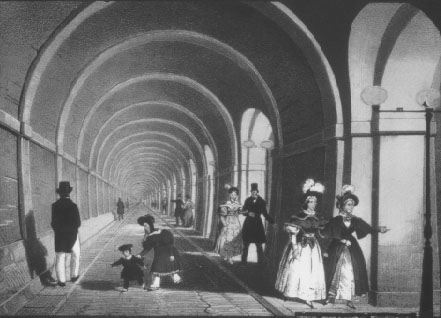
Inside the Thames Tunnel in the mid-19th century

Banquet in the Thames Tunnel by George Jones, 1827

The Thames Tunnel is a tunnel beneath the River Thames in London, connecting Rotherhithe and Wapping. It measures 35 ft (11 m) wide by 20 ft (6.1 m) high and is 1,300 ft (400 m) long, running at a depth of 75 ft (23 m) below the river surface measured at high tide. It is the first tunnel known to have been constructed successfully underneath a navigable river. (Note: Despite being the first tunnel known to have been successfully constructed underneath a navigable river, the Babylonians may have constructed the Euphrates Tunnel nearly 4,000 years earlier.) It was built between 1825 and 1843 by Marc Brunel, and his son, Isambard, using the tunnelling shield newly invented by the elder Brunel and Thomas Cochrane.

The tunnel was originally designed for horse-drawn carriages, but was mainly used by pedestrians and became a tourist attraction. In 1869 it was converted into a railway tunnel for use by the East London line which, since 2010, is part of the London Overground railway network under the ownership of Transport for London.

== History and development ==
=== Construction ===
At the start of the 19th century, there was a pressing need for a new land connection between the north and south banks of the Thames to link the expanding docks on each side of the river. The engineer Ralph Dodd tried, but failed, to build a tunnel between Gravesend and Tilbury in 1799.

Between 1805 and 1809, a group of Cornish miners, including Richard Trevithick, tried to dig a tunnel further upriver between Rotherhithe and Wapping/Limehouse, but failed because of the difficult conditions of the ground. The Cornish miners were used to hard rock and did not modify their methods for soft clay and quicksand. This Thames Archway project was abandoned after the initial pilot tunnel (a 'driftway') flooded twice when 1,000 ft (300 m) of a total of 1,200 ft (370 m) had been dug. It only measured 2–3 ft (0.6–0.9 m) by 5 ft (1.5 m), and was intended as a drain for a larger tunnel for passenger use. The failure of the Thames Archway project led engineers to conclude that "an underground tunnel is impracticable".

The Anglo-French engineer Marc Brunel refused to accept this conclusion. In 1814 he proposed to Emperor Alexander I of Russia a plan to build a tunnel under the river Neva in St Petersburg. This scheme was turned down (a bridge was built instead) and Brunel continued to develop ideas for new methods of tunnelling.

Thames Tunnel Act 1824
- Act of Parliament
- Parliament of the United Kingdom
- Long title: An Act for making and maintaining a Tunnel under the River Thames, from some Place in the Parish of Saint John of Wapping in the County of Middlesex, to the opposite Shore of the said River in the Parish of Saint Mary Rotherhithe in the County of Surrey, with sufficient Approaches thereto.
- Citation: 5 Geo. 4. c. clvi

Dates
- Royal assent: 24 June 1824

Thames Tunnel Company Act 1828
- Act of Parliament
- Parliament of the United Kingdom
- Long title: An Act for enabling the Thames Tunnel Company to raise a further Sum of Money, and for amending the Act relating to the said Tunnel.
- Citation: 9 Geo. 4. c. lxiii

Dates
- Royal assent: 23 May 1828

Other legislation
- Repealed by: Thames Tunnel Act 1866

Status: Repealed

Text of statute as originally enacted

Thames Tunnel Company Act 1833
- Act of Parliament
- Parliament of the United Kingdom
- Long title: An Act to amend the Acts relating to the Thames Tunnel Company, and to extend the Powers thereby given for raising Money for the Completion of the said Tunnel.
- Citation: 3 & 4 Will. 4. c. cxxi

Dates
- Royal assent: 28 August 1833

Text of statute as originally enacted

Brunel patented the tunnelling shield, a revolutionary advance in tunnelling technology, in January 1818. In 1823 Brunel produced a plan for a tunnel between Rotherhithe and Wapping, which would be dug using his new shield. Financing was soon found from private investors, including the Duke of Wellington, and a Thames Tunnel Company was formed by the Thames Tunnel Act 1824 (5 Geo. 4. c. clvi), the project beginning in February 1825.

The first step was the construction of a large shaft on the south bank at Rotherhithe, 150 ft (46 m) back from the river bank. It was dug by assembling an iron ring 50 ft (15 m) in diameter above ground. A brick wall 40 ft (12 m) high and 3 ft (0.9 m) thick was built on top of this, with a powerful steam engine surmounting it to drive the excavation's pumps. The whole apparatus was estimated to weigh 1,000 long tons (1,016 t; 1,120 short tons). The soil below the ring's sharp lower edge was removed manually by Brunel's workers. The whole shaft thus gradually sank under its own weight, slicing through the soft ground like a pastry cutter.

The shaft became stuck at one point during its sinking, as the pressure of the earth around it held it firmly in position. Extra weight was required to make it continue its descent. 50,000 bricks were added as temporary weights. It was realised that the problem was caused because the shaft's sides were parallel. Years later when the Wapping shaft was built, it was slightly wider at the bottom than the top. This non-cylindrical tapering design ensured it did not get stuck. By November 1825 the Rotherhithe shaft was in place and tunnelling work could begin.

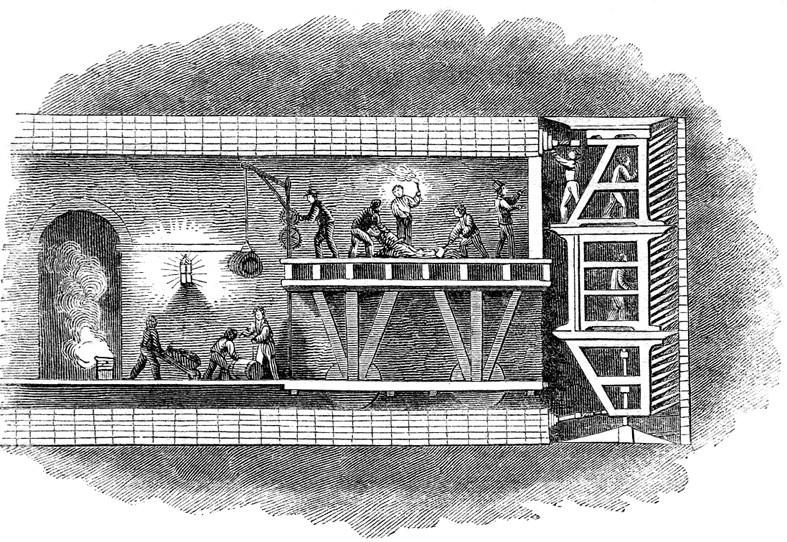
The shield in use during construction

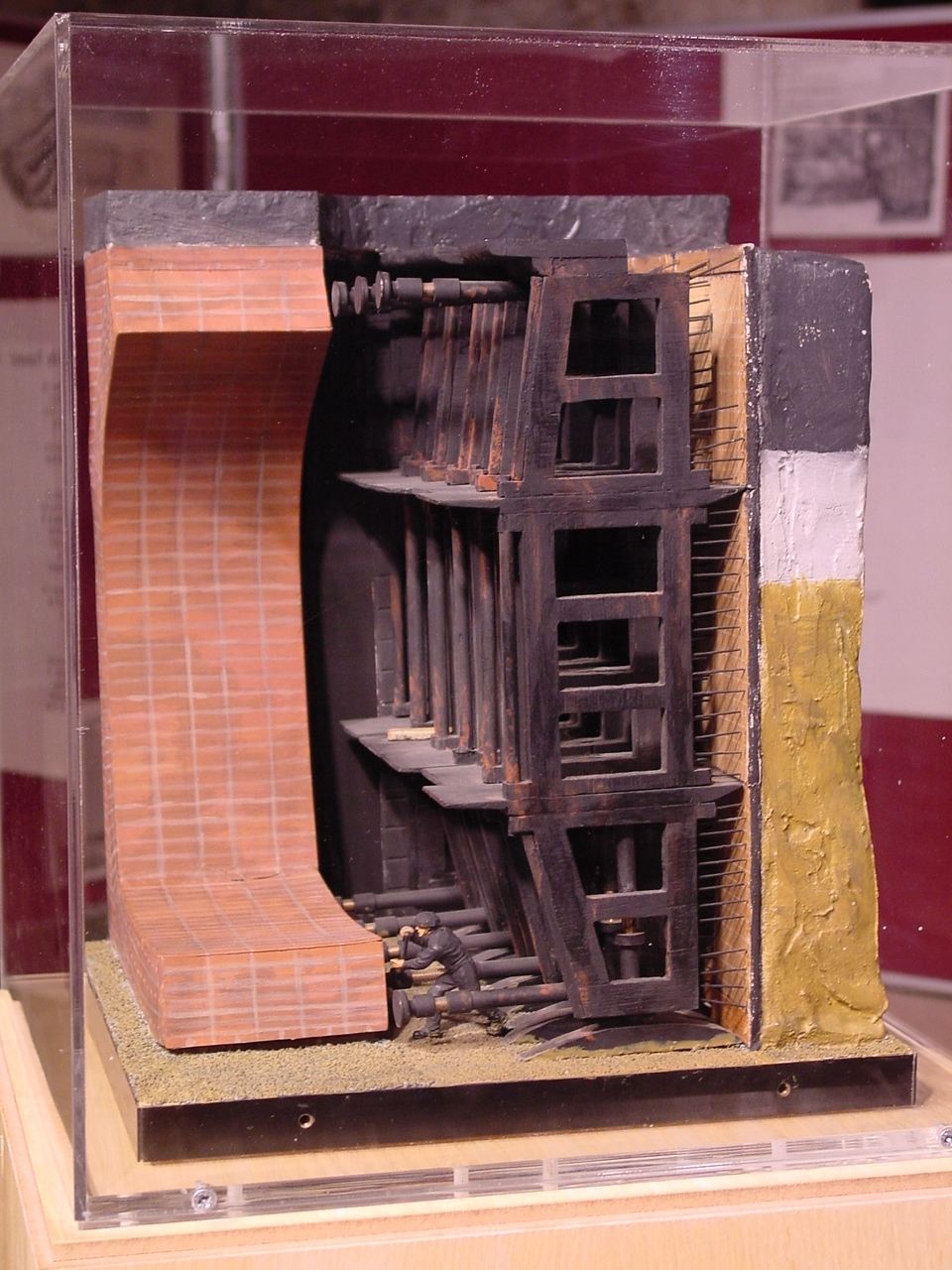
A scale model of the tunnelling shield at the Brunel Museum at Rotherhithe

The tunnelling shield, built at Henry Maudslay's Lambeth works and assembled in the Rotherhithe shaft, was the key to Brunel's construction of the Thames Tunnel. The Illustrated London News described how it worked:

The mode in which this great excavation was accomplished was by means of a powerful apparatus termed a shield, consisting of twelve great frames, lying close to each other like as many volumes on the shelf of a book-case, and divided into three stages or stories, thus presenting 36 chambers of cells, each for one workman, and open to the rear, but closed in the front with moveable boards. The front was placed against the earth to be removed, and the workman, having removed one board, excavated the earth behind it to the depth directed, and placed the board against the new surface exposed. The board was then in advance of the cell, and was kept in its place by props; and having thus proceeded with all the boards, each cell was advanced by two screws, one at its head and the other at its foot, which, resting against the finished brickwork and turned, impelled it forward into the vacant space. The other set of divisions then advanced. As the miners worked at one end of the cell, so the bricklayers formed at the other the top, sides and bottom.

Each of the twelve frames of the shield weighed over 7 long tons (7.1 t; 7.8 short tons). The key innovation of the tunnelling shield was its support for the unlined ground in front and around it to reduce the risk of collapses. However, many workers, including Brunel himself, soon fell ill from the poor conditions caused by filthy sewage-laden water seeping through from the river above. This sewage gave off methane gas which was ignited by the miners' oil lamps. When the resident engineer, John Armstrong, fell ill in April 1826, Marc's son Isambard Kingdom Brunel took over at the age of 20.

Work was slow, progressing at only 1–8 ft (0.3–2.4 m) a week. To earn income from the tunnel, the company directors allowed sightseers to view the shield in operation. They charged a shilling for the adventure and an estimated 600–800 visitors took advantage of the opportunity every day.

The excavation was hazardous. The tunnel flooded suddenly on 18 May 1827 after 549 ft (167 m) had been dug. Isambard Kingdom Brunel lowered a diving bell from a boat to repair the hole at the bottom of the river, throwing bags filled with clay into the breach in the tunnel's roof. Following the repairs and the drainage of the tunnel, he held a banquet inside it.

==== Closure ====
Six men died when the tunnel flooded again the following year, on 12 January 1828, just four days after a visit by Don Miguel, soon to become Regent of Portugal. Isambard himself was extremely lucky to survive the flooding. The six men had made their way to the main stairwell, as the emergency exit was known to be locked. Isambard instead made for the locked exit. A contractor named Beamish heard him there and broke the door down, and an unconscious Isambard was pulled out and revived. He was sent to Brislington, near Bristol, to recuperate. There he heard about the competition to build what became the Clifton Suspension Bridge.

==== Completion ====
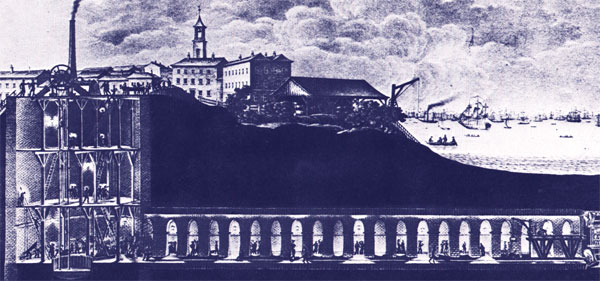
The Thames Tunnel excavation as it was, probably around 1840

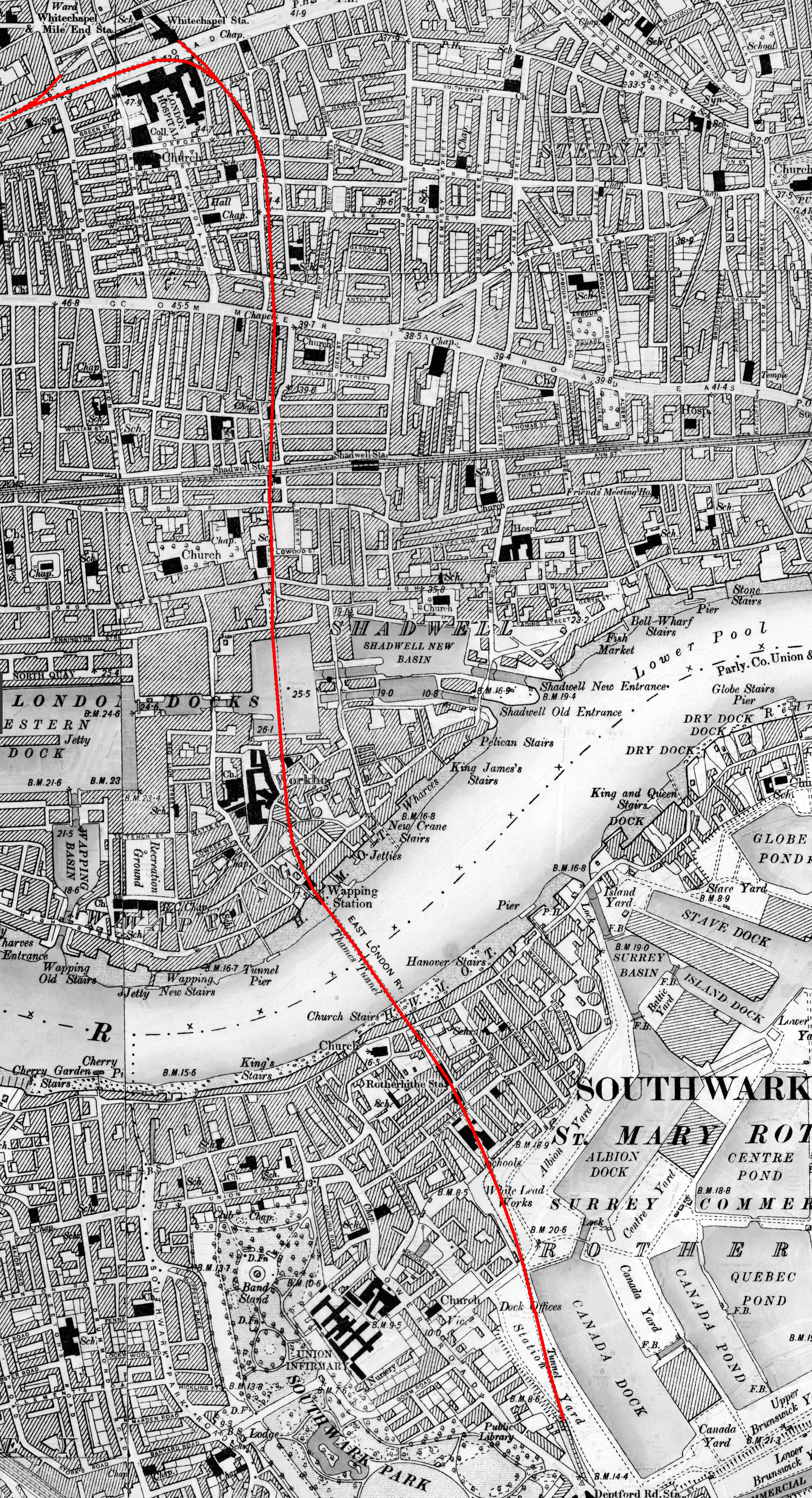
Underground route and approaches (highlighted in red) to the Thames Tunnel

In December 1834 Marc Brunel succeeded in raising enough money, including a loan of £247,000 from the Treasury, to continue construction.

Starting in August 1835 the old rusted shield was dismantled and removed. By March 1836 the new shield, improved and heavier, was assembled in place and boring resumed.

In 1835, the Italian poet Giacomo Leopardi parodied the construction of the Thames Tunnel in lines 126–129 of the poem "Palinodia al Marchese Gino Capponi".

Impeded by further floods (23 August and 3 November 1837, 20 March 1838, 3 April 1840) fires and leaks of methane and hydrogen sulphide gas, the remainder of the tunnelling was completed in November 1841, after another five and a half years. The extensive delays and repeated flooding made the tunnel the butt of metropolitan humour:

Good Monsieur Brunel
Let misanthropy tell
That your work, half complete, is begun ill;
Heed them not, bore away
Through gravel and clay,
Nor doubt the success of your Tunnel.

That very mishap,
When the Thames forced a gap,
And made it fit haunt for an otter,
Has proved that your scheme
Is no catchpenny dream;—
They can't say "'twill never hold water".

— James Smith, "The Thames Tunnel", in Memoirs, Letters, and Comic Miscellanies in Prose and Verse, of the Late James Smith, p. 185, H. Colburn, 1840

The Thames Tunnel was fitted out with lighting, roadways and spiral staircases during 1841–1842. An engine house on the Rotherhithe side, which now houses the Brunel Museum, was also constructed to house machinery for draining the tunnel. The tunnel was finally opened to the public on 25 March 1843.

=== Pedestrian usage ===
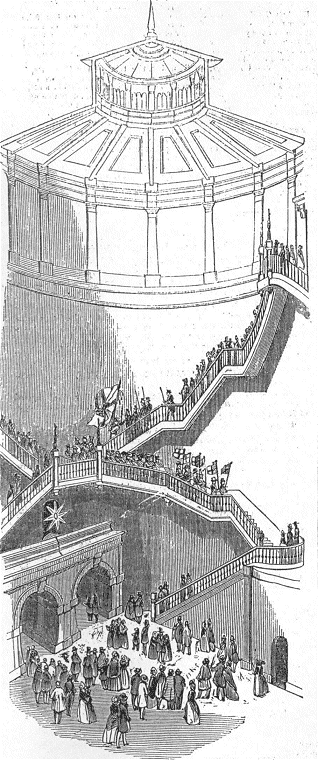
The entrance shaft to the Thames Tunnel

Although it was a triumph of civil engineering, the Thames Tunnel was not a financial success and had little practical benefit. It had cost £454,000 to dig and another £180,000 to fit out (£50 and £20 million in 2025) – far exceeding its initial cost estimates. Proposals to extend the entrance to accommodate wheeled vehicles failed owing to cost, and it was used only by pedestrians. It became a major tourist attraction, attracting about two million people a year, each paying a penny to pass through, and became the subject of popular songs. The American traveller William Allen Drew commented that "No one goes to London without visiting the Tunnel" and described it as the "eighth wonder of the world". However, when he saw it for himself in 1851, he pronounced himself "somewhat disappointed in it" but still left a vivid description of its interior, which was more like an underground marketplace than a transport artery:

Amongst the blocks of buildings [in Wapping] that separate the street from the river, we notice an octagonal edifice of marble. We enter by one of several great doors, and find ourselves in a rotunda of fifty feet diameter, and the floor laid in mosaic work of blue and white marble. The walls are stuccoed, around which are stands for the sale of papers, pamphlets, books, confectioners, beer, &c. A sort of watch-house stands on the side of the rotunda next the river, in which is a fat publican, or tax gatherer. Before him is a brass turnstile, through which you are permitted to pass, on paying him a penny, and, entering a door, you begin to descend the shaft, by a flight of very long marble steps that descend to a wide platform, from which the next series of steps descends in an opposite direction. The walls of the shaft are circular, finished in stucco, and hung with paintings and other curious objects. You halt a few moments on the first platform and listen to the notes of a huge organ that occupies a part of it, discoursing excellent music.

You resume your downward journey till you reach the next story, or marble platform, where you find other objects of curiosity to engage your attention whilst you stop to rest. And thus you go down – down – to the bottom of the shaft eighty feet; the walls meanwhile, being studded with pictures, statues, or figures in plaster, &c. Arrived at the bottom, you find yourself in a rotunda corresponding to that you entered from the street, a round room, with marble floor, fifty feet in diameter. There are alcoves near the walls in which are all sorts of contrivances to get your money, from Egyptian necromancers and fortune-tellers to dancing monkeys. The room is lighted with gas, and is brilliant.

Now look into the Thames Tunnel before you. It consists of two beautiful Arches, extending to the opposite side of the river. These Arches contain each a roadsted, fourteen feet wide and twenty-two feet high, and pathways for pedestrians, three feet wide. The Tunnel appears to be well ventilated, as the air seemed neither damp nor close. The partition between these Arches, running the whole length of the Tunnel, is cut into transverse arches, leading through from one roadsted to the other. There may be fifty of them in all, and these are finished into fancy and toy shops in the richest manner – with polished marble counters, tapestry linings gilded shelves, and mirrors that make everything appear double. Ladies, in fashionable dresses and with smiling faces, wait within and allow no gentleman to pass without giving him an opportunity to purchase some pretty thing to carry home as a remembrancer of the Thames Tunnel. The Arches are lighted with gas burners, that make it as bright as the sun; and the avenues are always crowded with a moving throng of men, women and children, examining the structure of the Tunnel, or inspecting the fancy wares, toys, &c., displayed by the arch-looking girls of these arches [...] It is impossible to pass through without purchasing some curiosity. Most of the articles are labelled – "Bought in the Thames Tunnel" – "a present from the Thames Tunnel".

Other opinions of the tunnel were more negative; some regarded it as the haunt of prostitutes and "tunnel thieves" who lurked under its arches and mugged passers-by. The American writer Nathaniel Hawthorne visited it a few years after Drew, and wrote in 1855 that the tunnel:

[...]consisted of an arched corridor of apparently interminable length, gloomily lighted with jets of gas at regular intervals [...] There are people who spend their lives there, seldom or never, I presume, seeing any daylight, except perhaps a little in the morning. All along the extent of this corridor, in little alcoves, there are stalls of shops, kept principally by women, who, as you approach, are seen through the dusk offering for sale [...] multifarious trumpery [...] So far as any present use is concerned, the tunnel is an entire failure.

=== Conversion into a railway tunnel ===
Thames Tunnel Act 1866
- Act of Parliament
- Parliament of the United Kingdom
- Long title: An Act for the winding-up of the Affairs and the Dissolution of the Thames Tunnel Company.
- Citation: 29 & 30 Vict. c. xx

Dates
- Royal assent: 18 May 1866

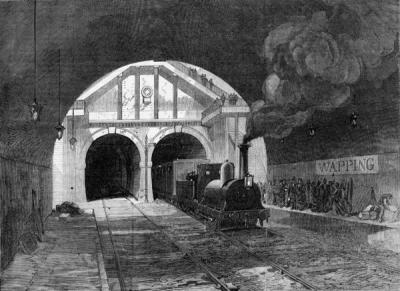
An 1870 view of a train exiting the Thames Tunnel at Wapping

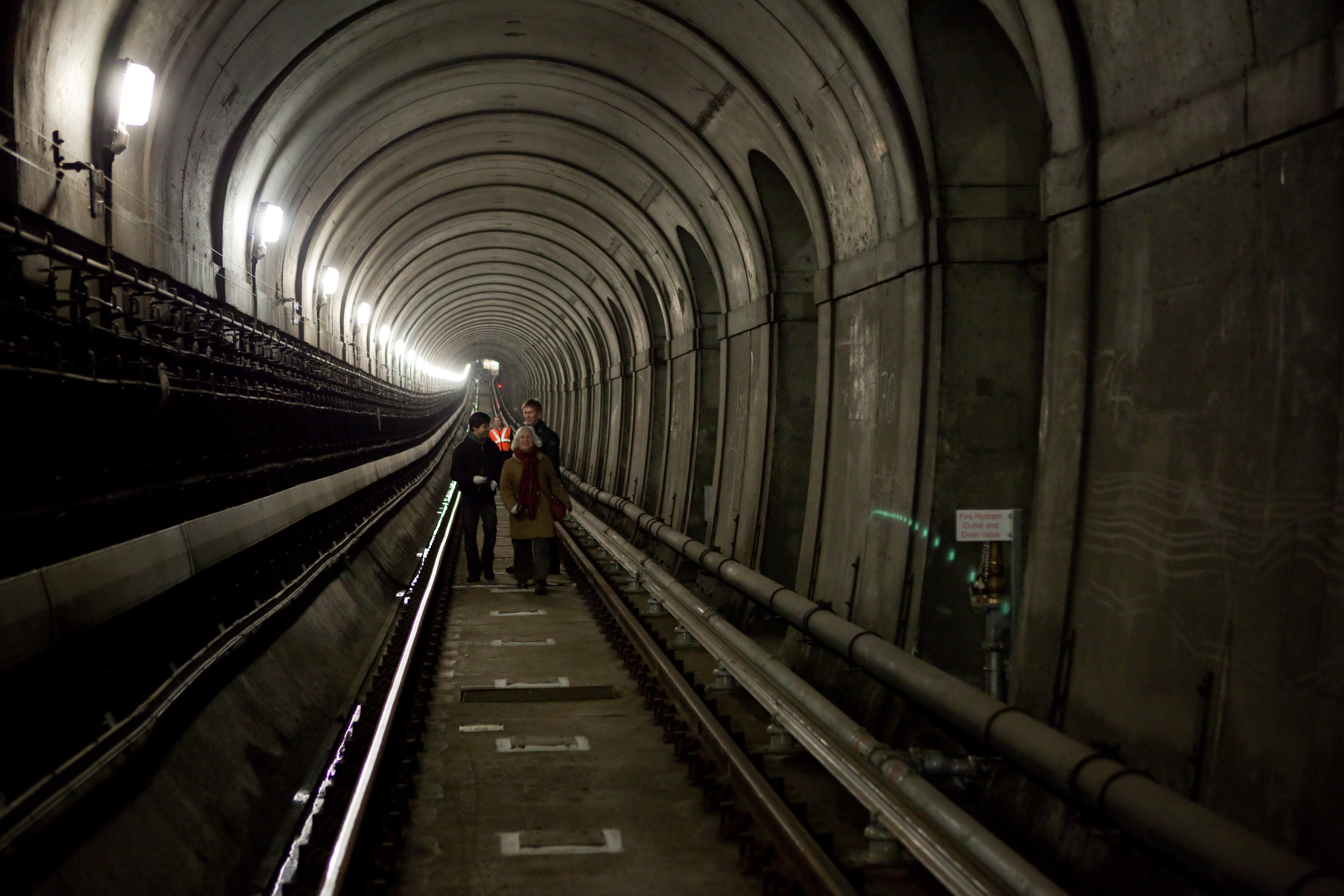
Inside the tunnel, 2010

The tunnel was purchased in September 1865 at a cost of £800,000 (equivalent to £87 million in 2025) by the East London Railway Company, a consortium of six mainline railways which sought to use the tunnel to provide a rail link for goods and passengers between Wapping (and later Liverpool Street) and the South London line. The tunnel's generous headroom, resulting from the architects' original intention of accommodating horse-drawn carriages, also provided a sufficient loading gauge for trains.

The line's engineer was Sir John Hawkshaw who was also noted, with W. H. Barlow, for the major re-design and completion of Isambard Brunel's long-abandoned Clifton Suspension Bridge at Bristol, which was completed in 1864.

The first train ran through the tunnel on 7 December 1869. In 1884, the tunnel's disused construction shaft to the north of the river was repurposed to serve as Wapping station.

The East London Railway was later absorbed into the London Underground, where it became the East London line. It continued to be used for goods services as late as 1962. During the Underground days, the Thames Tunnel was the oldest underground piece of the Tube's infrastructure.

It was planned to construct a junction between the East London Line and the Jubilee Line extension at Canada Water station. As construction would require the temporary closure of the East London Line, it was decided to take this opportunity to perform long-term maintenance on the tunnel and so in 1995 the East London Line was closed to allow construction and maintenance to take place. The proposed repair method for the tunnel was to seal it against leaks by "shotcreting" it with concrete, obliterating its original appearance, causing a controversy that led to a bitter conflict between London Underground, who wished to complete the work as quickly and cheaply as possible, and architectural interests wishing to preserve the tunnel's appearance. The architectural interests won, with the Grade II* listing of the tunnel on 24 March 1995, the day London Underground had scheduled the start of the long-term maintenance work.

Following an agreement to leave a short section at one end of the tunnel untreated, and more sympathetic treatment of the rest of the tunnel, the work went ahead and the route reopened – much later than originally anticipated – in 1998. The tunnel closed again from 23 December 2007 to permit tracklaying and resignalling for the East London Line extension. The extension work resulted in the tunnel becoming part of the new London Overground. After its reopening on 27 April 2010, it was used by mainline trains again.

=== Influence ===
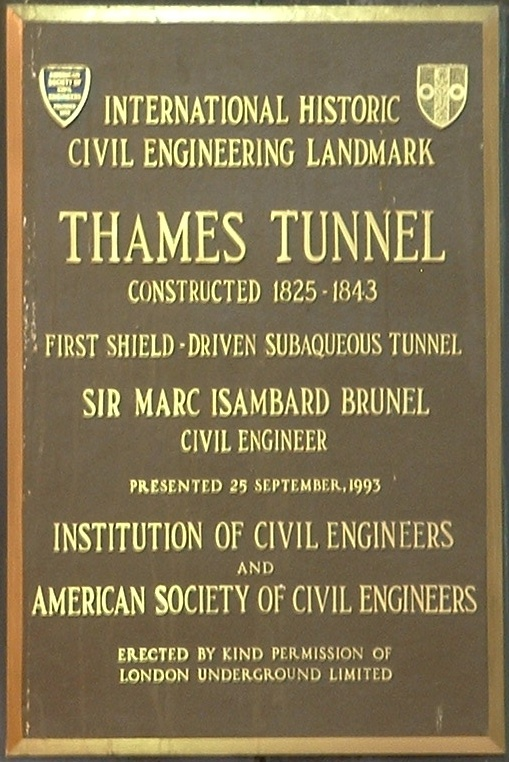
A commemorative plaque at Rotherhithe underground station before the East London line was closed in 2007

The construction of the Thames Tunnel showed that it was indeed possible to build underwater tunnels, despite the previous scepticism of many engineers. Several new underwater tunnels were built in the UK in the following decades: the Tower Subway in London; the Severn Tunnel under the River Severn; and the Mersey Railway Tunnel under the River Mersey. Brunel's tunnelling shield was later refined, with James Henry Greathead playing a particularly important role in developing the technology.

In 1991, the Thames Tunnel was designated as an International Historic Civil Engineering Landmark by the American Society of Civil Engineers and the Institution of Civil Engineers.

In 1995 the tunnel was listed at Grade II* in recognition of its architectural importance.

== Visiting ==
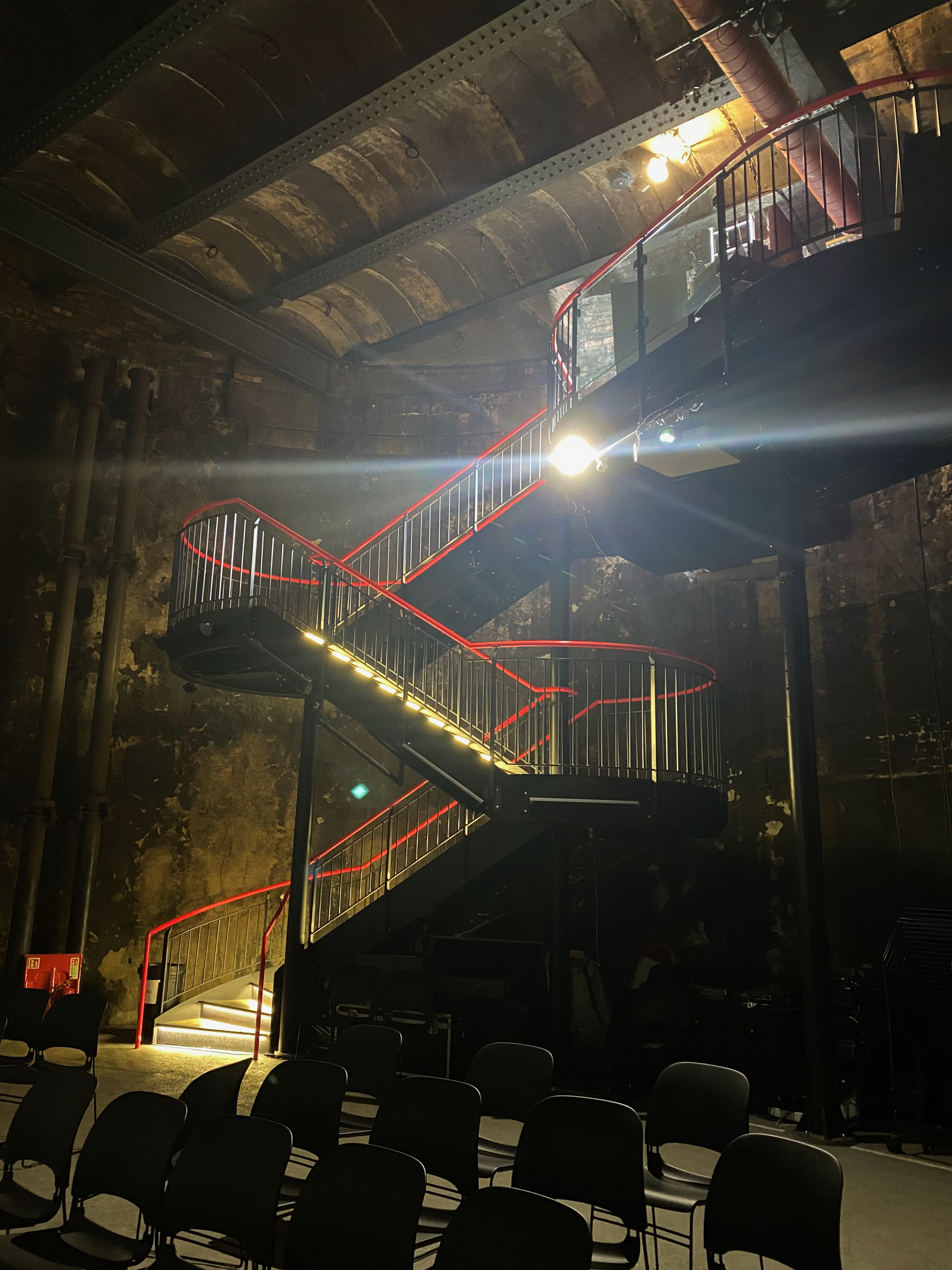
Staircase inside the shaft

Nearby in Rotherhithe, Brunel's engine house (built to house drainage pumps) is open to visitors as the Brunel Museum.

London Transport Museum sometimes opens the tunnel to allow walking tours, visitors may walk from one end of the tunnel to the other. Tours are a rare occurrence due to the constant use of the tunnel by trains. Such visits are only possible during sufficiently long engineering works. The tunnel has held tours three times in the last 20 years as of 2025.

In the 1860s, when trains started running through the tunnel, the entrance shaft at Rotherhithe was used for ventilation. The staircase was removed to reduce the risk of fire. In 2011, a concrete raft was built near the bottom of the shaft, above the tracks, when the tunnel was upgraded for the London Overground network. This space, with walls blackened with smoke from steam trains, forms part of the museum and functions at times as a concert venue and occasional bar. A rooftop garden has been built on top of the shaft. In 2016 the entrance hall opened as an exhibition space, with a staircase providing access to the shaft for the first time in over 150 years.

== See also ==
- List of crossings of the River Thames
- Tunnels underneath the River Thames
