= John Isham (composer) =

English composer and organist

John Isham (or John Isum) (1680?–1726) was an English composer and organist.

== Life ==
Born about 1680, he was educated at Merton College, Oxford. He went from there to London and served as deputy organist of St Anne's, Westminster, under William Croft. Croft resigned in Isham's favour in 1711, and in 1713 Isham went from London to Oxford to assist Croft in the performance of the exercise for his doctoral degree, and at the same time was himself admitted to the degree of Mus. Bac.

Appointed organist of St Andrew's, Holborn, in April 1718, and of St Margaret's, Westminster, in the following year, Isham held both posts until his death in June 1726, when he was buried in St. Margaret's Church.

== Works ==
Two anthems composed by Isham, Unto Thee, O Lord, and O sing unto the Lord a new song, are included in Croft's Divine Harmony, or a New Collection of Select Anthems (1712). With William Morley, he published, about 1710, a collection of songs; John Hawkins reprinted in his General History of the Science and Practice of Music a duet by Isham, Bury delights my roving eye. Other songs are catalogued under the name of Isum in the British Library.
