= Brunel Museum =

Engineering museum in London, England

Coordinates: 51.5016°N 0.0530°W

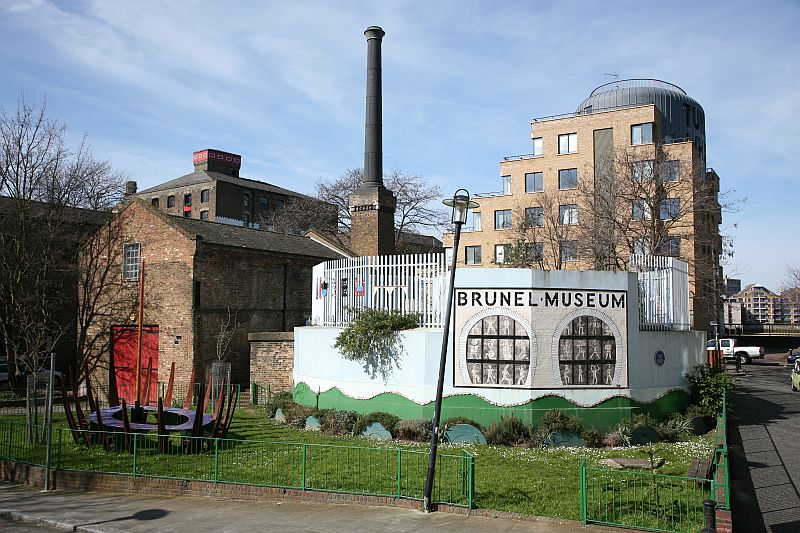
The Brunel Museum in 2007, showing the new mural of the tunnel shield on the Rotherhithe Shaft

The Brunel Museum is a small museum situated at the Brunel Engine House, Rotherhithe, London Borough of Southwark. The Engine House was designed by Sir Marc Isambard Brunel as part of the infrastructure of the Thames Tunnel which opened in 1843 and was the first underwater tunnel to have been built anywhere in the world. It comprises the Engine House and the Tunnel Shaft, with rooftop garden. Isambard Kingdom Brunel worked with his father on the project from 1823 and was appointed Resident Engineer in January 1827 at the age of 20.

== Tunnel Shaft / Grand Entrance Hall ==
The museum site includes the Tunnel Shaft which was the world's first caisson. A tower of brick 3 ft thick and 50 ft in diameter was built above ground to a height of 42 ft. It was then sunk under its own weight to a depth of 40 feet. The remaining 20 ft of shaft necessary to achieve the correct level for digging the tunnel was constructed by under-pinning. The tunnelling was done by miners standing within an iron shield (or ambulating cofferdam) designed and patented by Marc Isambard Brunel.

== Brunel Engine House ==
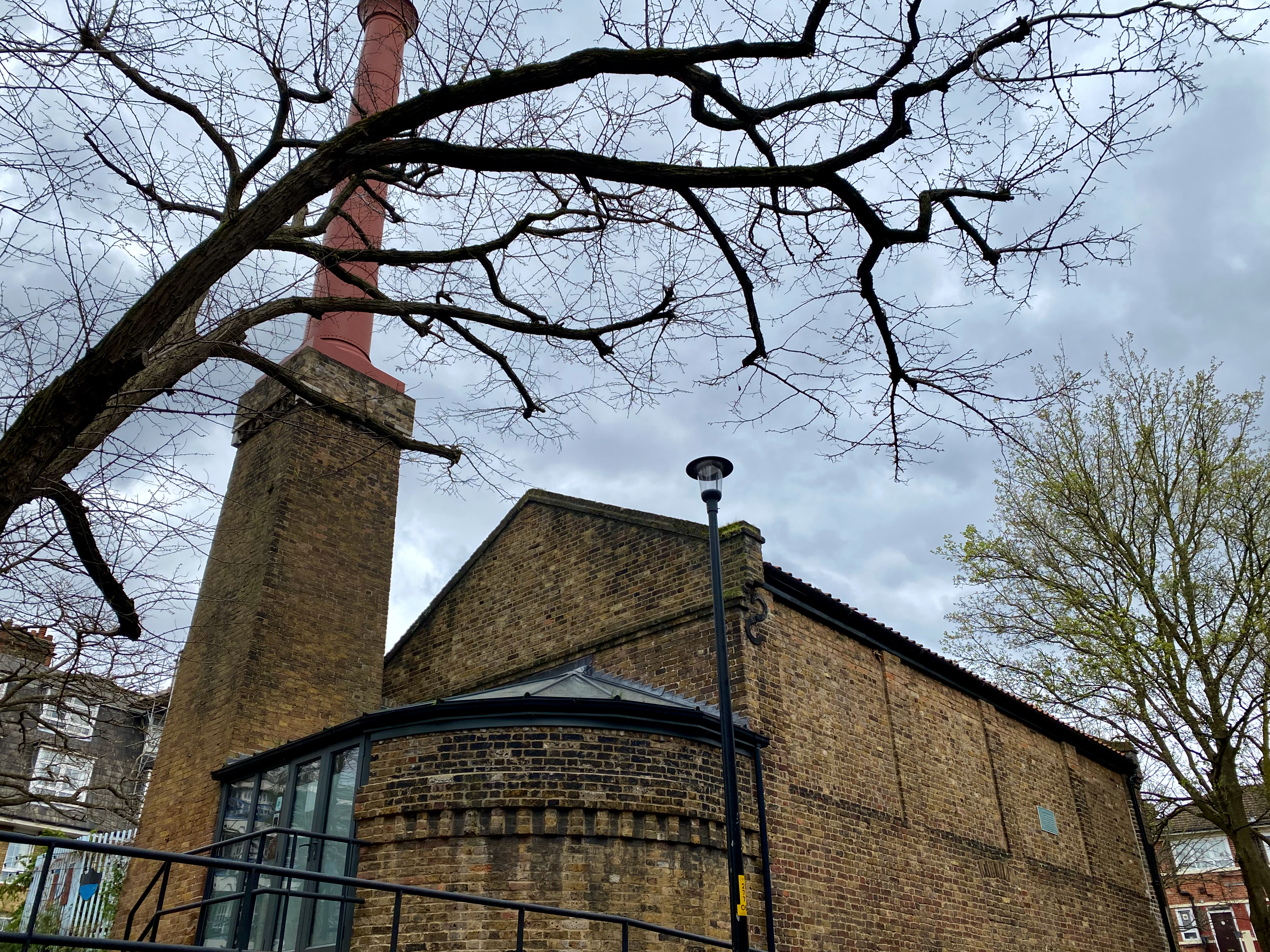
Brunel Engine House

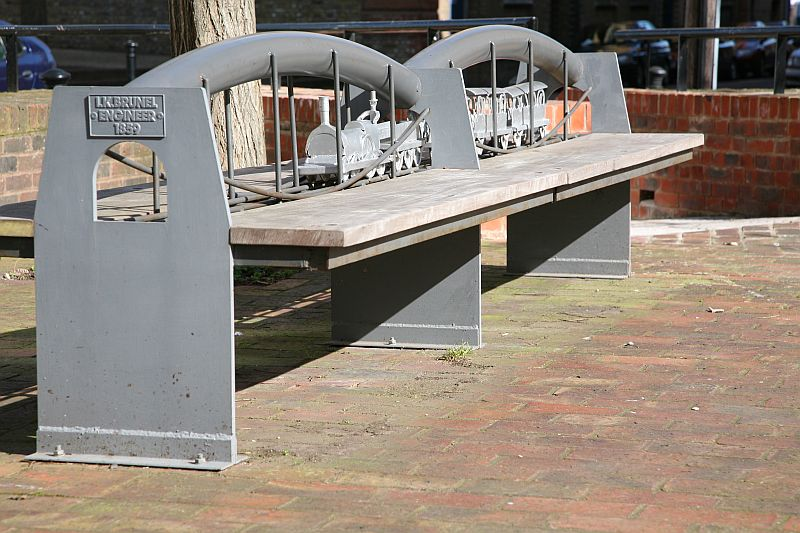
Bench seat incorporating a model of the Royal Albert Bridge, Saltash

The Engine House was designed by Sir Marc Isambard Brunel to be part of the infrastructure of the Thames Tunnel. It held steam-powered pumps used to extract water from the tunnel. It was originally used as a boiler house during the construction of the Thames Tunnel between 1825 and 1843.

Since 1961 the building has been used as a museum, displaying information on the construction of the tunnel and the other projects by Marc and Isambard Kingdom Brunel. The museum houses a model of the tunnelling shield as well as images and artefacts from when the tunnel was in use as a pedestrian thoroughfare between Rotherhithe and Wapping.

The chimney and engine house are Grade II Listed since 1974. Structural decay was prevented in 1975 by a charitable trust named "Brunel Exhibition Rotherhithe". The building was restored in 1979.

In 2006 the museum changed its name from Brunel Engine House to Brunel Museum and expanded its exhibition to include a new mural on the shaft showing the tunnel shield, and other works by the Brunels, such as models of famous Brunel bridges incorporated into bench seating.

In 2018, the museum raised more than £200,000, including a major grant from the National Heritage Memorial Fund, to buy an album including a collection of drawings of the Thames Tunnel, prepared or overseen by Marc Isambard Brunel (1769 –1849).

== Open House Weekend ==
The Brunel Museum takes part in the Open House Weekend event every year and, until the East London Line's temporary closure in 2007, took parties of people through the tunnel on the Underground trains as part of a guided tour of the tunnel.

They also host a variety of other events through the year, especially during school holidays. There are also walks/tours in person and online.

== Refurbishments ==
The museum underwent major building works in 2007. This entailed relocating the Rennie flat V steam engine to the Chatham Historic Dockyard to create a larger exhibition space, a cafe and improved toilet facilities. With the closure of the East London Line in December 2007 for extensive upgrading, the museum hoped that the access shaft into the tunnel (originally built to be the grand entrance hall to the tunnel) could be capped with a concrete shelf at the bottom, above the level of the trains.

In 2011, the construction of concrete floor at the bottom of the shaft was completed, sealing the shaft space off the train tunnels below it. After the completion, occasional tours were given access to the space. One such tours was on 14 February 2011 (a Valentine's tour) with ad-hoc stairwell to access the shaft.

The roof of the shaft was refurbished in 2012 to create Roof Garden on top of it. Since 2012, The Midnight Apothecary has run a cocktail bar within the roof garden, serving seasonal botanical drinks.

The shaft was extensively refurbished in 2016, with a staircase added to improve access. The refurbishment was done to minimize the impacts to the shaft structure including its walls. Although two test bors confirmed that the walls were made with 1.4-metre (4.6 ft) thick solid brick without any cavities, a specially designed freestanding staircase would not be attached to the shaft walls. The only allowed modification was to cut a new access door at the top of a wall. This careful construction preserved many of the remnants to show the shaft's history. A barred entrance passage at the top of the shaft once was used by a foreman to drag Isambard Kingdom Brunel out to save his life after a tunnel construction collapse that flooded the shaft. The scarred walls showed the locations of the original staircases when it was used as the Grand Entrance Hall. The soot from smoke coming off steam engine locomotives showed years of its use as a ventilation shaft. The shaft is now used for events as a performance space and it is part of the Brunel Museum exhibits.

Thames Tunnel Shaft interior

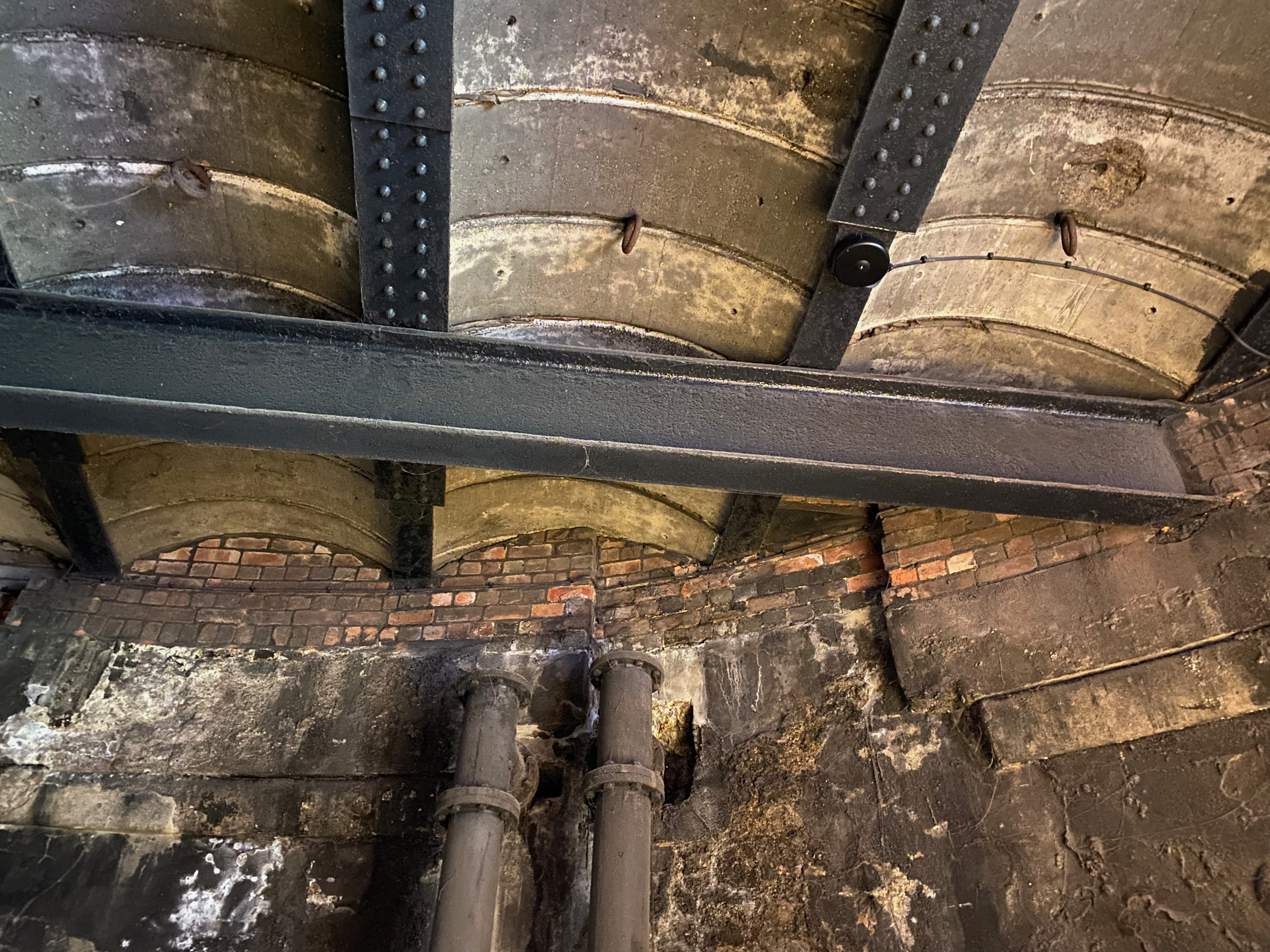
Roof structure to support the rooftop garden

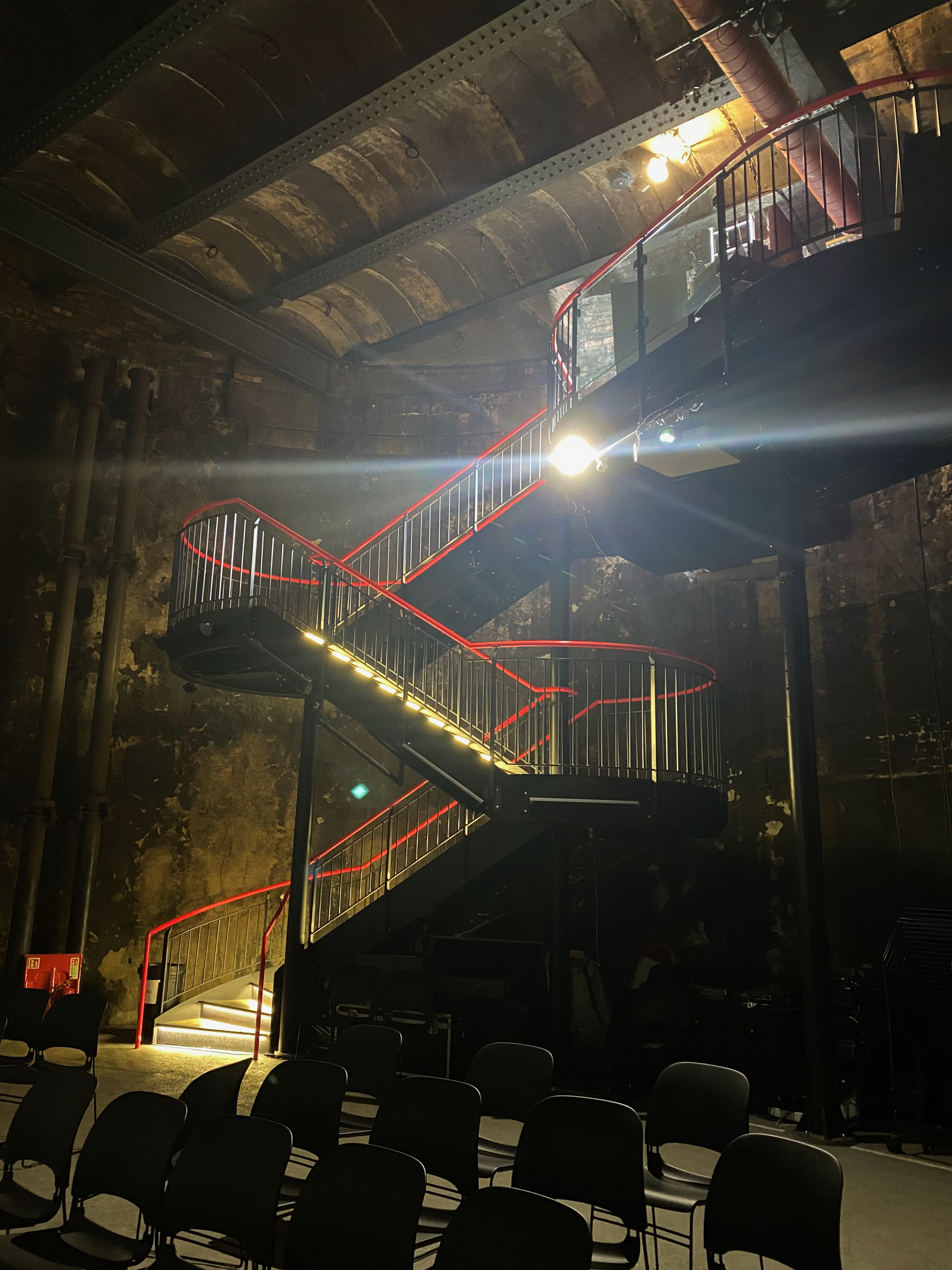
The new access staircase

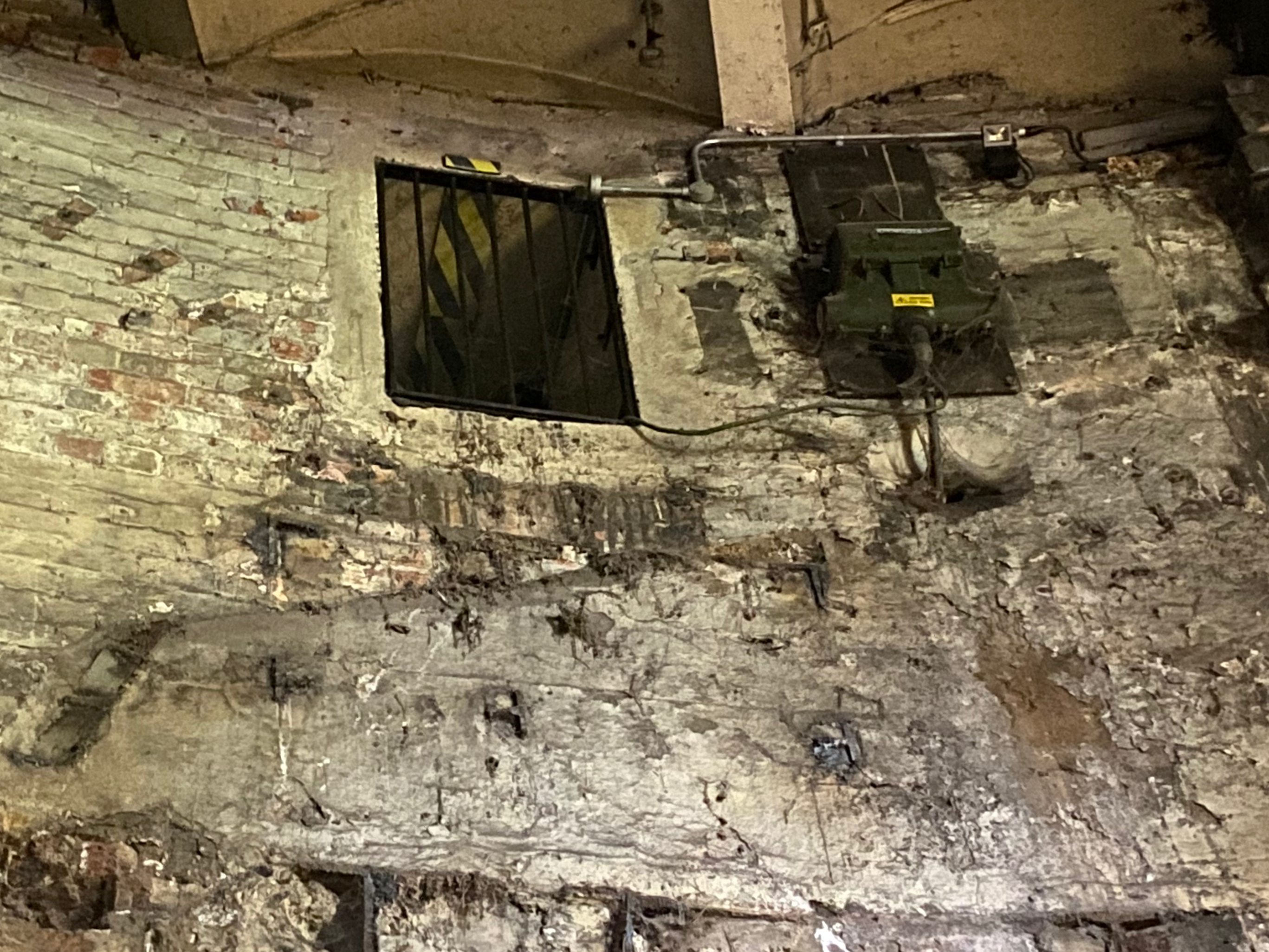
Barred entrance passage

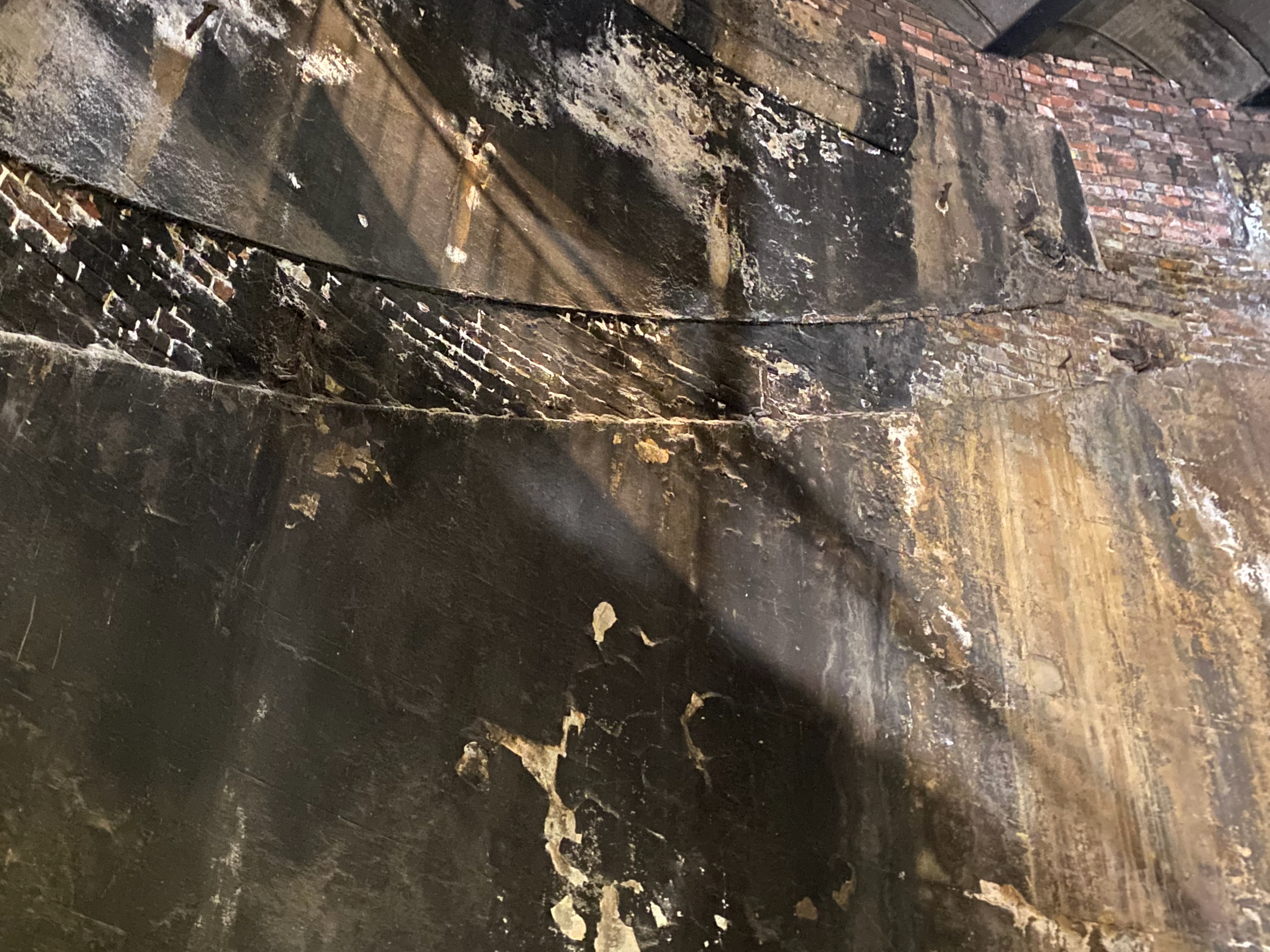
Remnants of original staircase and locomotive soot

== The Brunel Museum Reinvented project ==
In 2019, the museum received development funding from the Heritage Fund and other funders to transform their offer. If the next stage of the application is successful, this project will conserve the historic building, improve visitor facilities and provide a home for the recently acquired collection of Marc Brunel's Thames Tunnel watercolour designs. They will also be able to offer a wider range of events and activities for people. As of September 2020 this project is at the community consultation stage.
