= Marc Isambard Brunel =

French-British engineer (1769–1849)

Sir Marc Isambard Brunel FRS FRSE
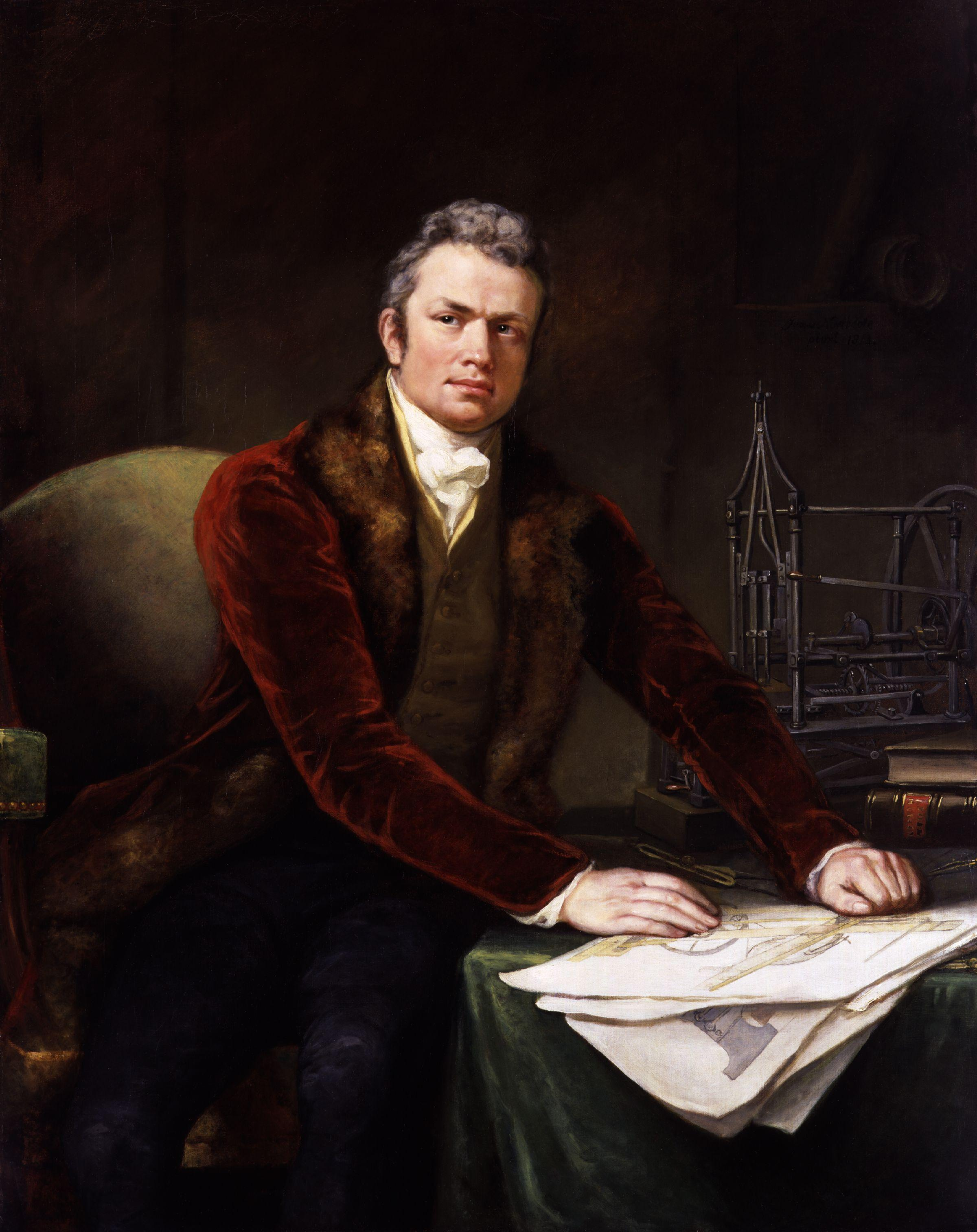
- Portrait of Marc Isambard Brunel by James Northcote, 1813
- Born: Marc Isambard Brunel; 25 April 1769; Hacqueville, Normandy, France
- Died: 12 December 1849 (aged 80); Westminster, London, England
- Resting place: Kensal Green Cemetery
- Occupation: Engineer
- Known for: Thames Tunnel
- Spouse: Sophia Kingdom (m. 1799)
- Children: Sophie; Emma; Isambard
- Military career
- Allegiance: Kingdom of France
- Branch: French Navy
- Service years: 1786–1792
- Awards: Knight Bachelor, 1841

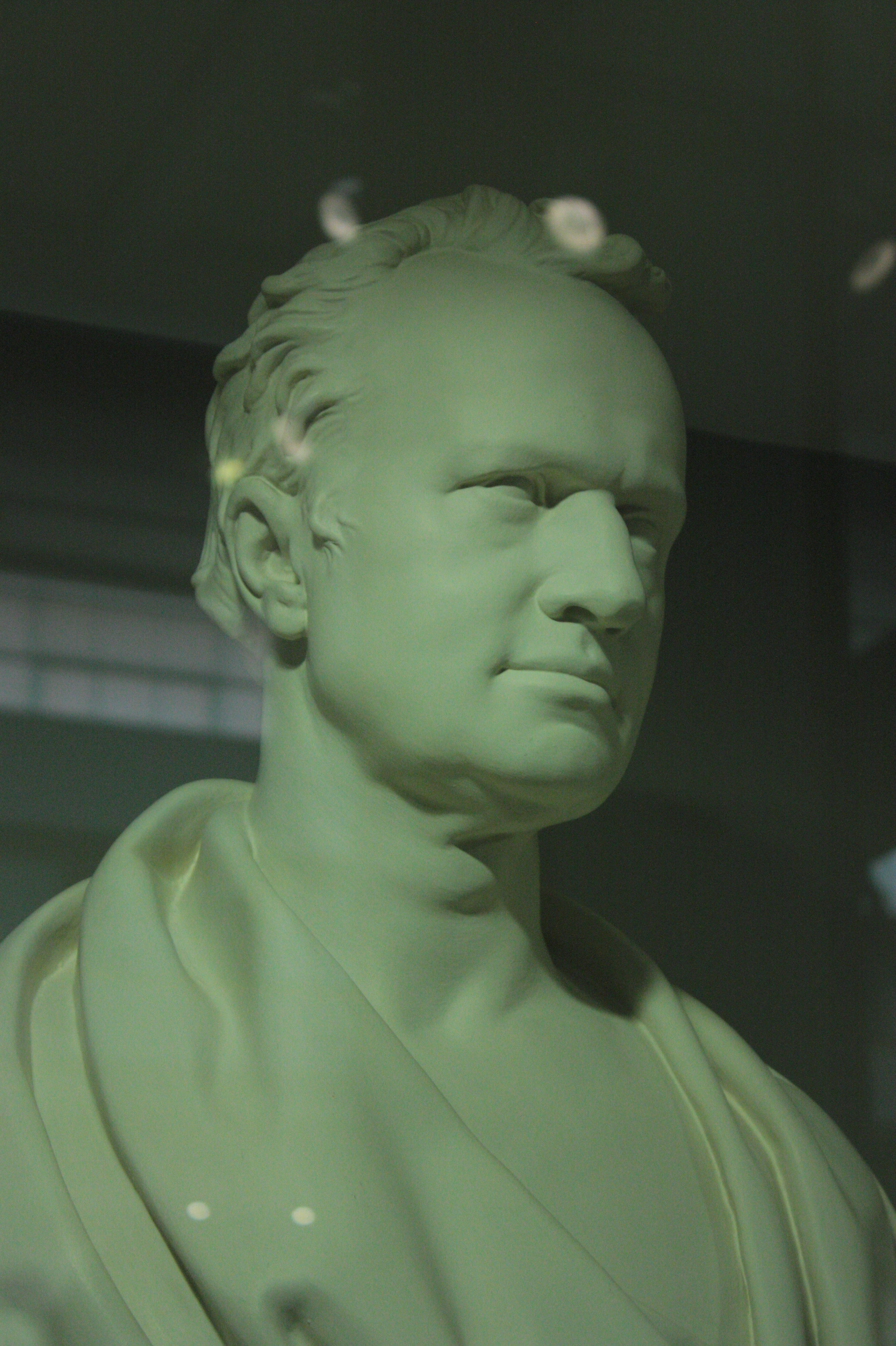
Bust of Marc Isambard Brunel, Science Museum, London

Sir Marc Isambard Brunel (/bruːˈnɛl/, French: [maʁk izɑ̃baʁ bʁynɛl]; 25 April 1769 – 12 December 1849) was a French-British engineer who is most famous for the work he did in Britain. He constructed the Thames Tunnel, the world's first underwater tunnel, and was the father of Isambard Kingdom Brunel.

Born in France, Brunel fled to the United States during the French Revolution. In 1796, he was appointed Chief Engineer of New York City. He moved to London in 1799, where he married Sophia Kingdom. In addition to the construction of the Thames Tunnel, his work as a mechanical engineer included the design of machinery to automate the production of pulley blocks for the Royal Navy.

Brunel preferred the given name Isambard, but is generally known to history as Marc to avoid confusion with his more famous son. In 1841, Marc was knighted by the young Queen Victoria in anticipation of his successful completion of the Thames Tunnel.

== Early life in France ==
Brunel was the second son of Jean Charles Brunel and Marie-Victoire Lefebvre. Jean Charles was a prosperous farmer in Hacqueville, Normandy, and Marc was born on the family farm. It was customary in prosperous families for the first son to inherit the family land and the second son to enter the priesthood. His father therefore started Marc on a classical education, but he showed no liking for Greek or Latin and instead showed himself proficient in drawing and mathematics. He was also very musical from an early age.

At the age of eleven he was sent to a seminary in Rouen. The superior of the seminary allowed him to learn carpentry, and he soon achieved the standards of a cabinetmaker. He also sketched ships in the local harbour. As he showed no desire to become a priest, his father sent him to stay with relatives in Rouen, where a family friend tutored him on naval matters. In 1786, as a result of this tuition, Marc became a naval cadet on a French frigate and during his service visited the West Indies several times. He made an octant for himself from brass and ivory, and used it during his service.

In 1789, during Brunel's service abroad, the French Revolution began. In January 1792 Brunel's frigate paid off its crew, and Brunel returned to live with his relatives in Rouen. He was a Royalist sympathiser, as were most of the inhabitants of Normandy. In January 1793, whilst visiting Paris during the trial of Louis XVI, Brunel unwisely publicly predicted the demise of Robespierre, one of the leaders of the Revolution. He was lucky to get out of Paris with his life, and returned to Rouen. However, it was evident that he would have to leave France. During his stay in Rouen, Brunel had met Sophia Kingdom, a young English woman who was an orphan and was working as a governess. He was forced to leave her behind when he fled to Le Havre and boarded the American ship Liberty, bound for New York.

== United States ==
Brunel arrived in New York on 6 September 1793, and he subsequently travelled to Philadelphia and Albany. He got involved in a scheme to link the Hudson River by canal with Lake Champlain, and also submitted a design for the new Capitol building to be built in Washington. The judges were very impressed with the design, but it was not selected.

In 1796, after taking citizenship, Brunel was appointed chief engineer of the city of New York. He designed various houses, docks, commercial buildings, an arsenal, and a cannon factory. No official records exist of the projects that he carried out in New York, and it seems likely that the documents were destroyed in the New York draft riots of 1863. In 1798, during a dinner conversation, Brunel learnt of the difficulties that the Royal Navy had in obtaining the 100,000 pulley blocks that it needed each year. Each of these was made by hand. Brunel quickly produced an outline design of a set of machines that would automate their production. He decided to sail to England and put his invention before the Admiralty. He sailed for England on 7 February 1799 with a letter of introduction to the Navy Minister, and on 7 March his ship, Halifax, landed at Falmouth.

== Britain ==
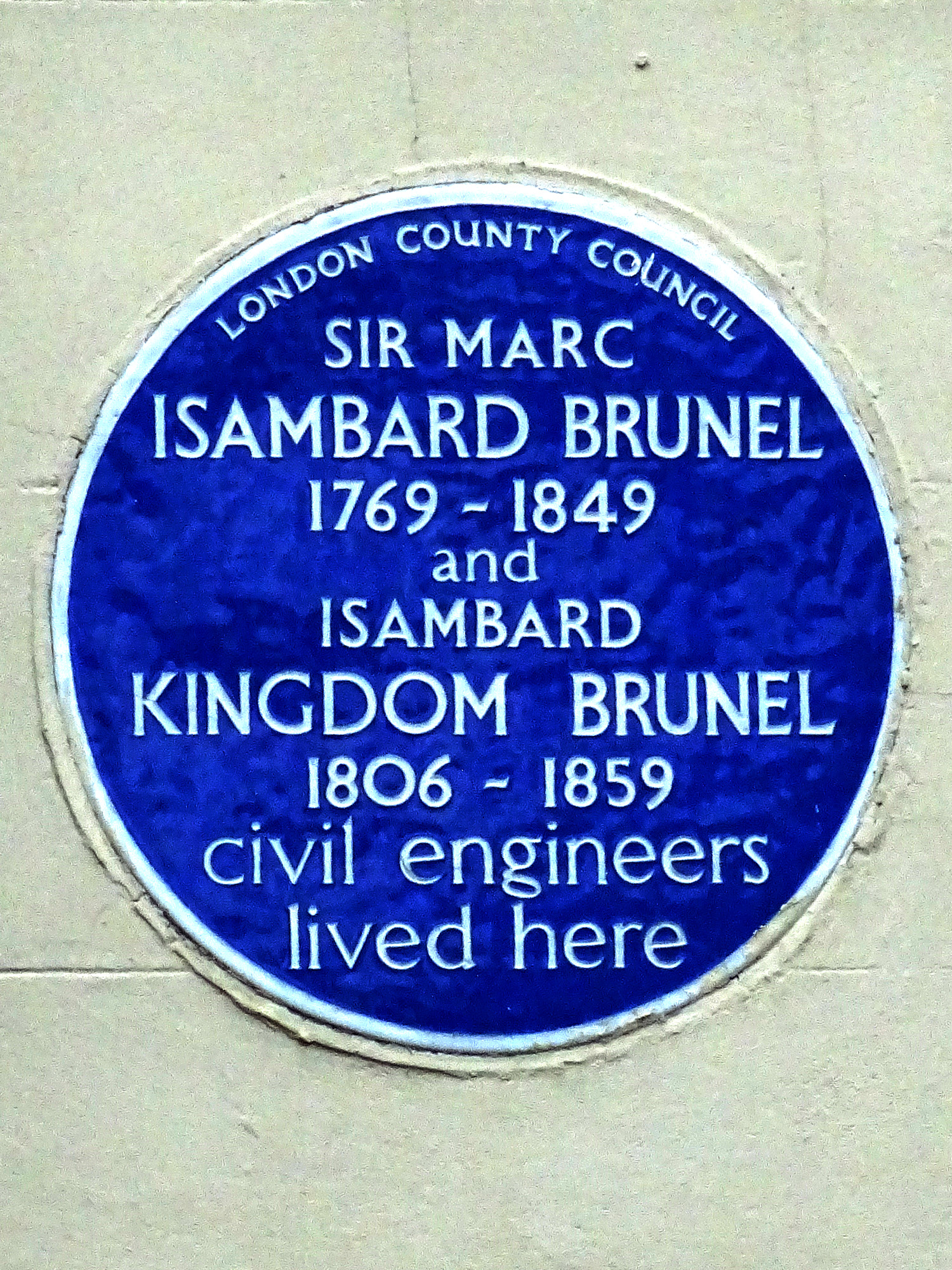
English Heritage blue plaque at 98 Cheyne Walk, Chelsea, London

While Brunel was in the United States, Sophia Kingdom had remained in Rouen and during the Reign of Terror, she was arrested as an English spy and daily expected to be executed. She was only saved by the fall of Robespierre in June 1794. In April 1795 Kingdom was able to leave France and travel to London.

When Brunel arrived in Britain, he immediately travelled to London and made contact with Kingdom. They were married on 1 November 1799 at St Andrew, Holborn. In 1801 she gave birth to their first child, a daughter, Sophia; in 1804 their second daughter Emma; and in 1806 their son Isambard Kingdom, who became a great engineer. Isambard Kingdom grew up in Lindsey House in Chelsea, London.

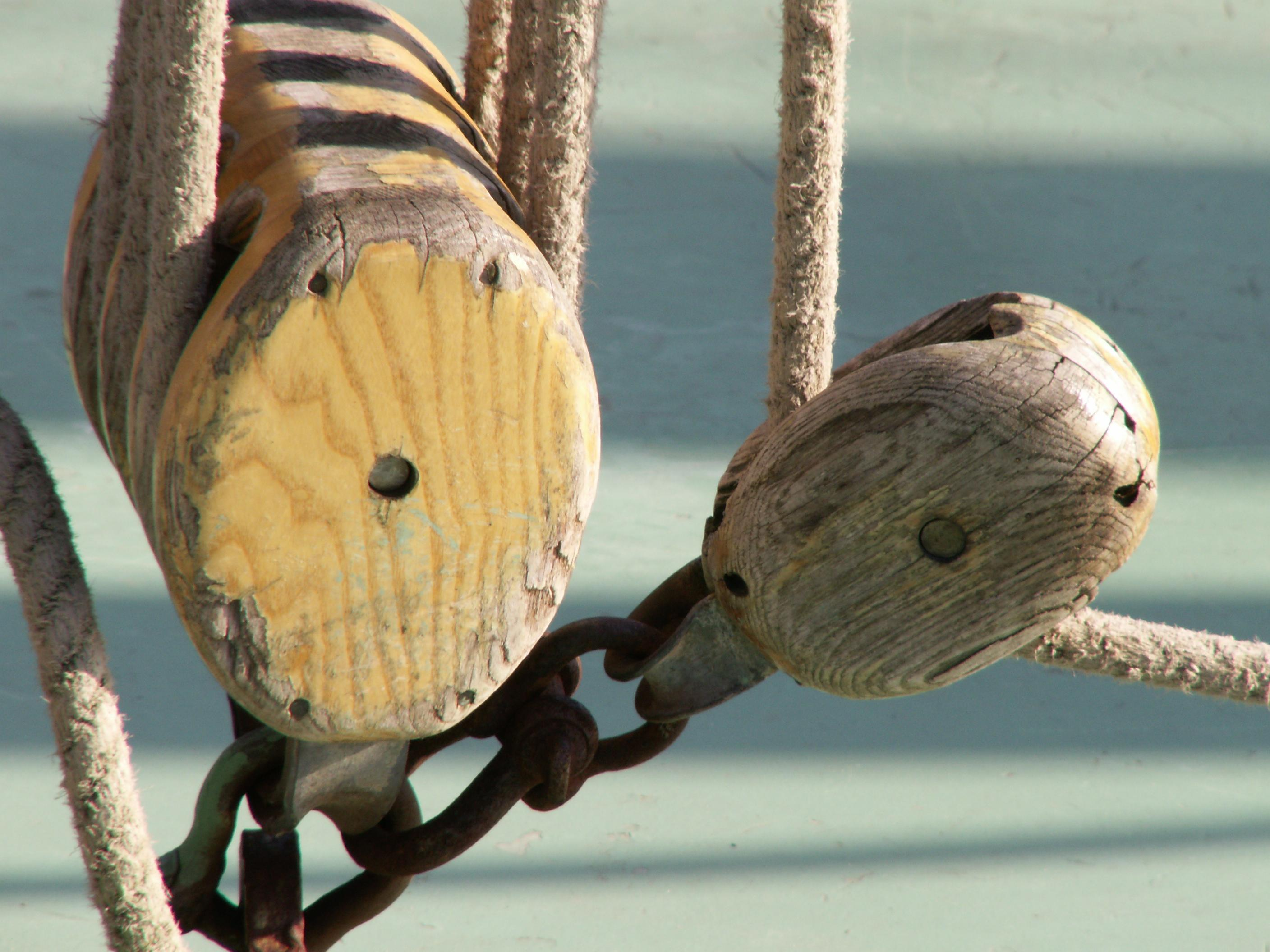
One multiple- and one single-sheave pulley block for rigging on a sailing ship

During the summer of 1799 Brunel was introduced to Henry Maudslay, a talented engineer who had worked for Joseph Bramah, and had recently started his own business. Maudslay made working models of the machines for making pulley blocks, and Brunel approached Samuel Bentham, the Inspector General of Naval Works. In April 1802 Bentham recommended the installation of Brunel's block-making machinery at Portsmouth Block Mills. Brunel's machine could be operated by unskilled workers, at ten times the previous rate of production. Altogether 45 machines were installed at Portsmouth, and by 1808 the plant was producing 130,000 blocks per year. The Admiralty vacillated over payment, despite the fact that Brunel had spent more than £2,000 of his own money on the project. In August 1808 they agreed to pay £1,000 on account, and two years later they consented to a payment of just over £17,000.

Brunel was a talented mechanical engineer, and did much to develop sawmill machinery, undertaking contracts for the British Government at Chatham and Woolwich dockyards, building on his experience at the Portsmouth Block Mills. He built a sawmill at Battersea, London (burnt down in 1814 and rebuilt by 1816), which was designed to produce veneers, and he also designed sawmills for entrepreneurs. He also developed machinery for mass-producing soldiers' boots, but before this could reach full production, demand ceased due to the end of the Napoleonic Wars. Brunel was made a Fellow of the Royal Society in 1814. In 1828, he was elected a foreign member of the Royal Swedish Academy of Sciences. Brunel was elected a Foreign Honorary Member of the American Academy of Arts and Sciences in 1834. In 1845 he was elected an Honorary Fellow of the Royal Society of Edinburgh.

== Debtors' prison ==
Despite an historically successful endeavour—a "pioneering enterprise in mass production"—in the automation of block manufacturing, and his recognition in 1814 as a Royal Society Fellow, the payment difficulties experienced with the Admiralty and further unprofitable ventures led to Brunel being deeply in debt by early 1821; in May of that year he was tried and then committed to the King's Bench Prison (a debtors' prison) in Southwark. Prisoners in a debtors' prison were allowed to have their family with them, and Sophia accompanied him. Brunel spent 88 days incarcerated. As time passed with no prospect of gaining release, Brunel began to correspond with Alexander I of Russia about the possibility of moving with his family to St Petersburg to work for the Tsar. As soon as it was learnt that Britain was likely to lose such an eminent engineer as Brunel, influential figures, such as the Duke of Wellington, began to press for government intervention. The government granted £5,000 to clear Brunel's debts on condition that he abandon any plans to go to Russia. As a result, Brunel was released from prison in August.

== Thames Tunnel ==
In 1805 the Thames Archway Company was formed with the intention of driving a tunnel beneath the Thames between Rotherhithe and Limehouse. Richard Trevithick was engaged by the company to construct the tunnel. He used Cornish miners to work on the tunnel. In 1807 the tunnel encountered quicksand and conditions became difficult and dangerous. Eventually the tunnel was abandoned after more than 1,000 feet had been completed, and expert opinion, led by William Jessop, was that such a tunnel was impracticable.

Brunel had already drawn up plans for a tunnel under the River Neva in Russia, but this scheme never came to fruition. In 1818 Brunel had patented a tunnelling shield. This was a reinforced shield of cast iron in which miners would work in separate compartments, digging at the tunnel-face. Periodically the shield would be driven forward by large jacks, and the tunnel surface behind it would be lined with brick. It is claimed that Brunel found the inspiration for his tunnelling shield from the shipworm, Teredo navalis, which has its head protected by a hard shell whilst it bores through ships' timbers.

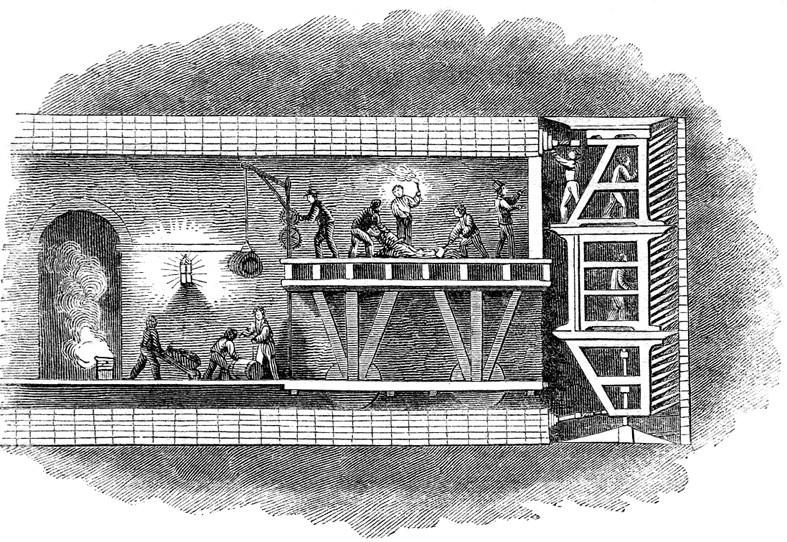
A diagram of the tunnelling shield used to construct the Thames Tunnel

Brunel's invention provided the basis for subsequent tunnelling shields used to build the London Underground system and many other tunnels. Brunel was so convinced that he could use such a tunnelling shield to dig a tunnel under the Thames, that he wrote to every person of influence who might be interested. At last in February 1824 a meeting was held and 2,128 shares at £50 each were subscribed for. In June 1824 the Thames Tunnel Company was incorporated by royal assent. The tunnel was intended for horse-drawn traffic.

Work began in February 1825, by sinking a 50-foot-diameter (15 m) vertical shaft on the Rotherhithe bank. This was done by constructing a 50-foot-diameter metal ring, upon which a circular brick tower was built. As the tower rose in height, its weight forced the ring into the ground. At the same time, workmen excavated the earth in the centre of the ring. This vertical shaft was completed in November 1825, and the tunnelling shield, which had been manufactured at Lambeth by Henry Maudslay's company, was then assembled at the bottom. Maudslay also supplied the steam powered pumps for the project.

The shield was rectangular in cross section, and consisted of twelve frames, side by side, each of which could be moved forward independently of the others. Each frame contained three compartments, one above the other, each big enough for one man to excavate the tunnel face. The whole frame accommodated 36 miners. When enough material had been removed from the tunnel face, the frame was moved forward by large jacks. As the shield moved forward, bricklayers followed, lining the walls. The tunnel required over 7.5 million bricks.

=== Problems ===
Brunel was assisted in his work by his son, Isambard Kingdom Brunel, now 18 years old. Brunel had planned the tunnel to pass no more than fourteen feet below the riverbed at its lowest point. This caused problems later. Another problem that hindered Brunel was that William Smith, the chairman of the company, thought that the tunnelling shield was an unnecessary luxury, and that the tunnel could be made more cheaply by traditional methods. He wanted Brunel replaced as Chief Engineer and constantly tried to undermine his position. The shield quickly proved its worth. During the tunnelling both Brunel and his assistant engineer suffered ill health and for a while Isambard had to bear the whole burden of the work.

Banquet in the Thames Tunnel by George Jones, 1827. Marc Brunel is shown on the left with his son Isambard.

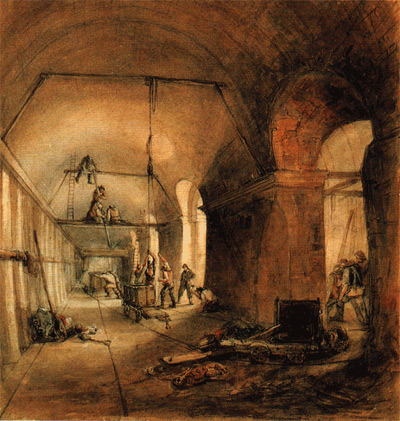
Inside the Thames Tunnel during construction, 1830

There were several instances of flooding at the tunnel face due to its nearness to the bed of the river. In May 1827 it was necessary to plug an enormous hole that appeared on the riverbed. The resources of the Thames Tunnel Company were consumed, and despite efforts to raise more money, the tunnel was sealed up in August 1828. Brunel resigned from his position, frustrated by the continued opposition from the chairman. He undertook various civil engineering projects, including helping his son, Isambard, with his design of the Clifton Suspension Bridge.

In March 1832 William Smith was deposed as chairman of the Thames Tunnel Company. He had been a thorn in Brunel's side throughout the project. In 1834 the government agreed a loan of £246,000 to the Thames Tunnel Company. The old 80-ton tunnelling shield was removed and replaced by a new improved 140-ton shield consisting of 9,000 parts that had to be fitted together underground. Tunnelling was resumed but there were still instances of flooding in which the pumps were overwhelmed. Miners were affected by the constant influx of polluted water, and many fell ill. As the tunnel approached the Wapping shore, work began on sinking a vertical shaft similar to the Rotherhithe one. This began in 1840 and took thirteen months to complete.

On 24 March 1841 Brunel was knighted by the young Queen Victoria. This was at the suggestion of Prince Albert who had shown keen interest in the progress of the tunnel. The tunnel opened on the Wapping side of the river on 1 August 1842. On 7 November 1842 Brunel suffered a stroke that paralysed his right side for a time. The Thames Tunnel officially opened on 25 March 1843. Brunel, despite ill health, took part in the opening ceremony. Within 15 weeks of opening, one million people visited the tunnel. On 26 July 1843 Queen Victoria and Prince Albert visited. Although intended for horse-drawn traffic, the tunnel remained pedestrian only.

=== Later developments ===
In 1865 the East London Railway Company purchased the Thames Tunnel for £200,000 and four years later the first trains passed through it. The tunnel became part of the London Underground system, and remains in use today, as part of the East London Line of London Overground.

The engine house in Rotherhithe was taken over by a charitable trust in 1975 and transformed into the Brunel Museum in 2006.

== Subsequent life ==
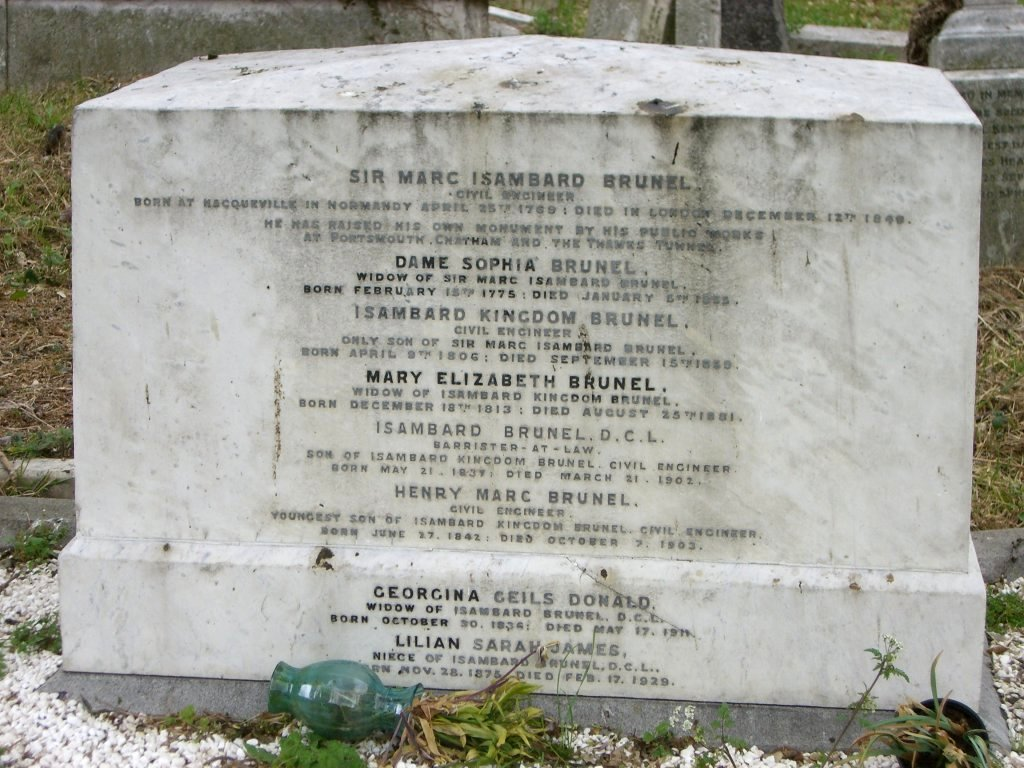
Brunel family grave in Kensal Green Cemetery, Kensington, London

After the completion of the Thames Tunnel, his greatest achievement, Brunel was in poor health. He never again accepted major commissions, although he did help his son, Isambard, on various projects. He was proud of his son's achievements, and was present at the launch of the SS Great Britain in Bristol on 19 July 1843. In 1845 Brunel suffered another, more severe stroke and was almost totally paralysed on his right side. On 12 December 1849, Brunel died at the age of 80, and his remains were interred in Kensal Green Cemetery in London. His wife, Sophia, was subsequently interred in the same plot, followed by their son, Isambard, just 10 years later.
