= Sophia Kingdom =

British aristocrat

- Born: Sophia Kingdom; 15 February 1775; Plymouth, Devon, England
- Died: 5 January 1855 (aged 79)
- Known for: Mother of Isambard Kingdom Brunel
- Spouse: Marc Isambard Brunel (m. 1799)
- Children: 3; including Isambard Kingdom Brunel

Sophia Kingdom (15 February 1775 – 5 January 1855), later known as Lady Brunel, was the mother of Isambard Kingdom Brunel. Her father was William Kingdom, a contracting agent for the Royal Navy and the army, and her mother was Joan Spry. While working in France as a governess she met Marc Isambard Brunel (1769–1849) at Rouen in the early 1790s. In 1793, Marc Brunel had to flee the French Revolution, but Sophia remained in Rouen. During the Reign of Terror, she was arrested as an English spy, and was saved only by the fall of Robespierre in June 1794. In April 1795, Sophia Kingdom was able to leave France and travel to London.

Marc Brunel and Sophia Kingdom married on 1 November 1799. They had two daughters, Sophia Macnamara and Emma, followed by a son, Isambard Kingdom Brunel, born on 9 April 1806. Isambard was one of the greatest engineers of the 19th century. Sophia's sister, Elizabeth Kingdom (1761–1856), married Thomas (1760–1843) the namesake son of Thomas Mudge, the horologist. A Tunnel Boring Machine is named after Sophia.

== Life ==
Sophia Kingdom, later known as Lady Brunel, was the mother of Isambard Kingdom Brunel. Her father was William Kingdom, a contracting agent for the Royal Navy and the army, and her mother was Joan Spry. She was born in Plymouth, England. She was the youngest of sixteen children. When she was eight years old, her father William died (1783).

Sophia Kingdom was sent to France to improve her knowledge of the French language. She became ill on the journey over, and whilst her travelling companions decided to return to England to avoid the escalating unrest in France, she was unable to accompany them and instead remained in France. While working there as a governess she met Marc Isambard Brunel (1769–1849) at Rouen in the early 1790s. In 1793, Marc Brunel had to flee the French Revolution, going to the United States, but Sophia remained in Rouen. During the Reign of Terror, she was arrested as an English spy, and daily expected to be executed. She was only saved by the fall of Robespierre in June 1794. In April 1795, Sophia Kingdom was able to leave France and travel to London.

Marc Brunel remained in the United States for six years, sailing for England in February 1799. He immediately searched for and found Sophia Kingdom in London. They married on 1 November 1799.

They had two daughters, Sophia Macnamara and Emma, followed by a son, Isambard Kingdom Brunel, born on 9 April 1806. Isambard was one of the greatest engineers of the 19th century.

Sophia's sister, Elizabeth Kingdom (1761–1856), married Thomas (1760–1843) the namesake son of Thomas Mudge, the horologist.

== TBM ==
A Tunnel Boring Machine on Crossrail is named after Sophia.

== Sources ==
- Oxford Dictionary of National Biography
